= Mostar International Airport =

Airport serving Mostar, Bosnia and Herzegovina

Mostar International Airport Međunarodna zračna luka Mostar

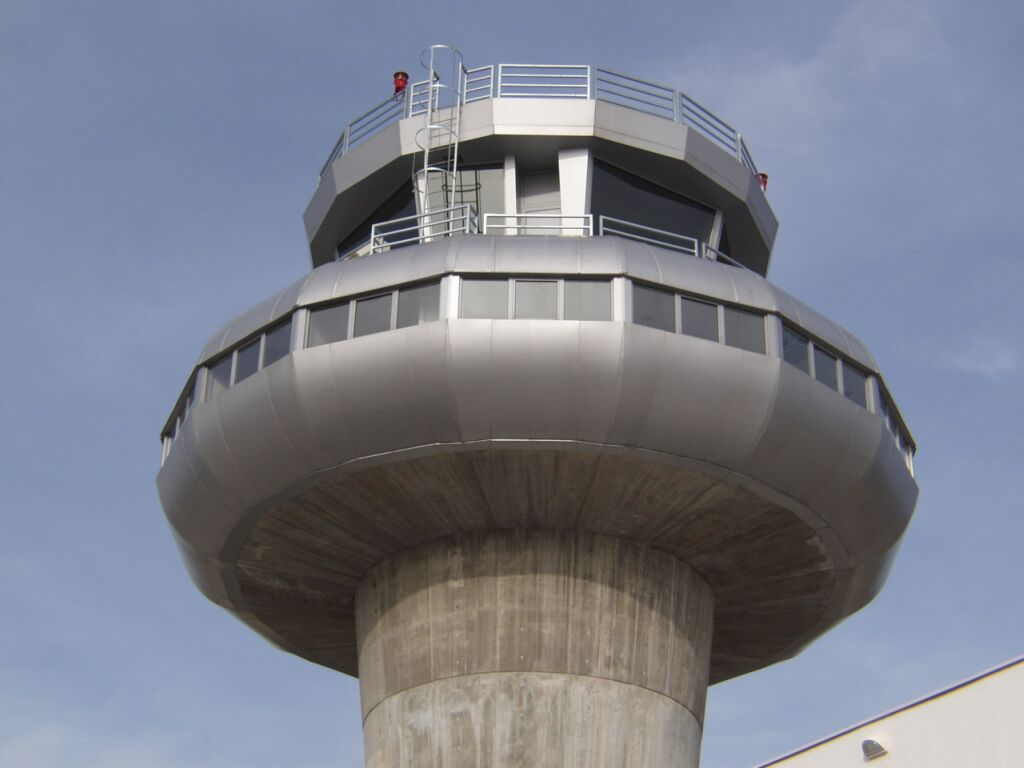
- IATA: OMO; ICAO: LQMO

Summary
- Airport type: Public
- Owner: City of Mostar (88%); Zagreb Airport (12%)
- Operator: Mostar Airport Ltd.
- Serves: Mostar, Bosnia and Herzegovina
- Location: Ortiješ
- Operating base for: Sky Alps
- Elevation AMSL: 48 m (157 ft)
- Coordinates: 43°16′58″N 17°50′45″E
- Website: mostar-airport.ba

Map
- Location within Bosnia and Herzegovina

Runways
Direction	Length		Surface
Direction	m	ft	Surface
15/33	2,400	7,874	Asphalt

Statistics (2024)
- Passengers: 47,544 ▲131,4%
- Aircraft Movements: 686 ▲64,1%
- Freight (in tons): 0 ▼0%
- Source: Bosnian and Herzegovinian Directorate of Civil Aviation BHDCA

Mostar International Airport (Croatian: Međunarodna zračna luka Mostar; IATA: OMO, ICAO: LQMO) is an airport near Mostar, Bosnia and Herzegovina, in the village of Ortiješ, 4 NM (7.4 km; 4.6 mi) southeast of Mostar's railway station.

== History ==
=== Foundation and early years ===
Mostar Airport was opened for civilian air traffic in 1965, targeting domestic flights. Prior to 1965, Mostar was a local airport with a large concrete runway used by aircraft manufacturer SOKO for testing and delivering military aircraft. Military underground hangar was built here. Currently, the airport primarily serves charter flights for Catholics making the pilgrimage to nearby Medjugorje.

The record number of 86,000 passengers was recorded in the year 1990.

=== Development since the 2000s ===
In 2012, the airport had a twofold increase in traffic, making it the second-busiest in Bosnia and Herzegovina after Sarajevo airport. In November 2017, German low-cost carrier Eurowings was the first airline to schedule regular flights from Mostar, namely to Düsseldorf and Stuttgart, serving both with two weekly flights from May 2018 respectively. On 3 May 2018, the first landing of a Croatia Airlines aircraft marked the introduction of the twice weekly nonstop Mostar-Zagreb service.

The COVID-19 pandemic has severely disrupted the airports operations, causing Croatia Airlines and Eurowings not to continue their services as planned, therefore losing all scheduled traffic. Also, numerous irregularities in the spending of airport funds and illegally elected administration were noticed. The airport received 1,000,000 Bosnia and Herzegovina convertible marks (€500,000) from the government in March 2021 as an aid to overcome the Covid-crisis. On 8 September 2021, Croatia Airlines operated a charter flight from Shannon in Ireland to Mostar Airport, marking the resumption of any civilian traffic in Mostar since March 2020. Airport management also started negotiating flights with low cost airline Wizz Air to sustain direct flights to the diaspora in Germany and Sweden, tough without any outcome. In 2023, Mostar gained two new direct links to Italy, with AeroItalia launching flights to the secondary airport of Forlì and Greek charter airline Lumiwings connecting Mostar with Foggia. Both routes were discontinued after just one season.

== Airlines and destinations ==
The following airlines operate regular scheduled and charter flights at Mostar Airport:

Airlines	Destinations
Air Serbia	Belgrade
Bulgaria Air	Seasonal charter: Sofia
Croatia Airlines	Zagreb; Seasonal charter: Dublin
Eurowings	Stuttgart; Seasonal: Düsseldorf
Sky Alps	Seasonal: Bari, Palermo, Rome–Fiumicino

== Statistics ==
Passenger statistics
Year/Month	January	February	March	April	May	June	July	August	September	October	November	December	Year total	Change
2026	2,018	1,661	2,409	5,560	7,693	8,269	8,700	12,645	10,205	7,904			67,064	
2025	2,320	1,965	2,289	2,747	6,757	8,314	9,198	14,797	10,795	6,393	2,761	3,978	72,314	▲52,1%
2024	788	868	929	1,771	4,762	5,431	6,378	10,149	6,039	4,740	2,652	3,037	47,544	▲131.4%
2023	5	30	4	874	1,320	1,533	2,573	5,838	3,736	2,617	992	1,022	20,544	▲91.8%
2022	6	39	21	110	189	942	2,151	4,623	1,914	711	5	n/a	10,711	▲693.2%
2021	2	16	2	12	17	76	218	253	664	324	153	205	1,942	▲41.34%
2020	384	267	133	0	0	0	0	76	190	11	25	288	1,374	▼95.81%
2019	163	294	289	1,291	2,423	4,029	4,677	8,369	6,218	3,512	931	670	32,866	▲15.46%
2018	0	171	448	1,557	3,881	4,004	3,173	7,561	4,963	1,654	570	481	28,463	▼33.9%
2017	290	493	1,014	3,741	5,406	5,765	5,201	8,876	7,437	4,121	379	395	43,118	▼19.5%
2016	226	24	1,122	3,797	6,139	7,178	8,411	10,788	10,225	4,692	n/a	n/a	53,618	▼28.5%
2015	775	186	2,425	6,680	11,867	9,696	9,715	13,305	11,502	6,718	852	1,303	75,024	▲10.3%
2014	395	117	1,575	5,817	9,689	9,288	8,831	10,691	10,499	7,731	1,426	1,921	67,980	▼1.3%
2013	155	7	2,453	7,737	9,082	9,146	6,665	11,103	9,599	7,602	3,339	2,058	68,939	▼13.2%
2012	177	318	2,139	9,169	8,677	11,922	9,921	13,737	10,839	6,360	2,923	1,873	78,055	▲212.0%
2011	554	0	696	2,193	4,029	5,087	4,343	4,644	8,432	4,265	1,086	1,478	36,807	▲206.0%

== See also ==
- List of airports in Bosnia and Herzegovina
- Banja Luka International Airport
- Sarajevo International Airport
- Tuzla International Airport
