= Gnojnice =

- Village
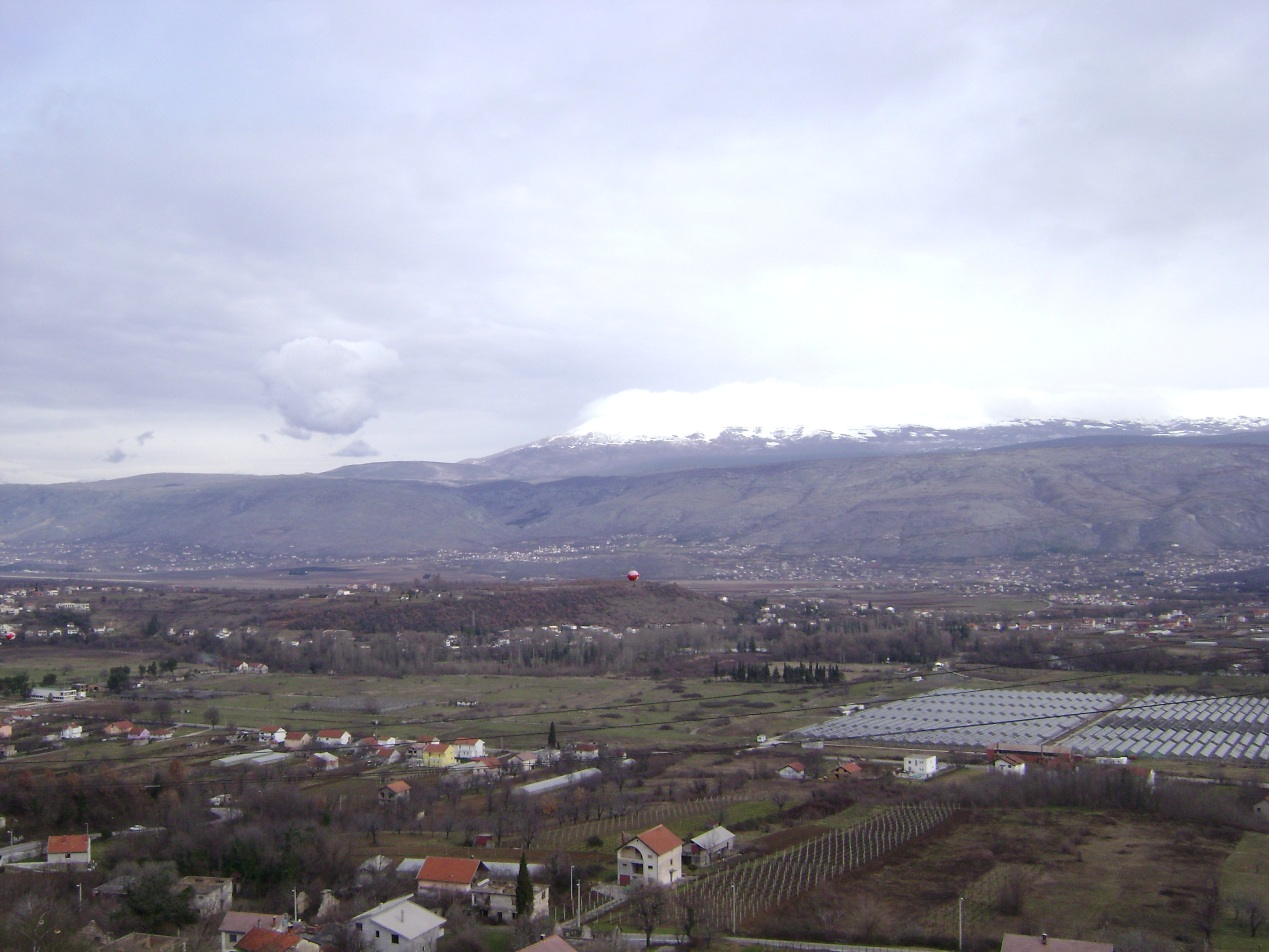

- Location within Bosnia and Herzegovina
- Coordinates: 43.296045°N 17.8314327°E
- Country: Bosnia and Herzegovina
- Entity: Federation of Bosnia and Herzegovina
- Canton: Herzegovina-Neretva
- Municipality: City of Mostar

Area
  - Total: 5.00 sq mi (12.94 km^{2})

Population (2013)
  - Total: 3,637
  - Density: 728.0/sq mi (281.1/km^{2})
- Time zone: UTC+1 (CET)
  - Summer (DST): UTC+2 (CEST)
- Postal code: 88000 (Same as Mostar)
- Area code: (+387) 36 345

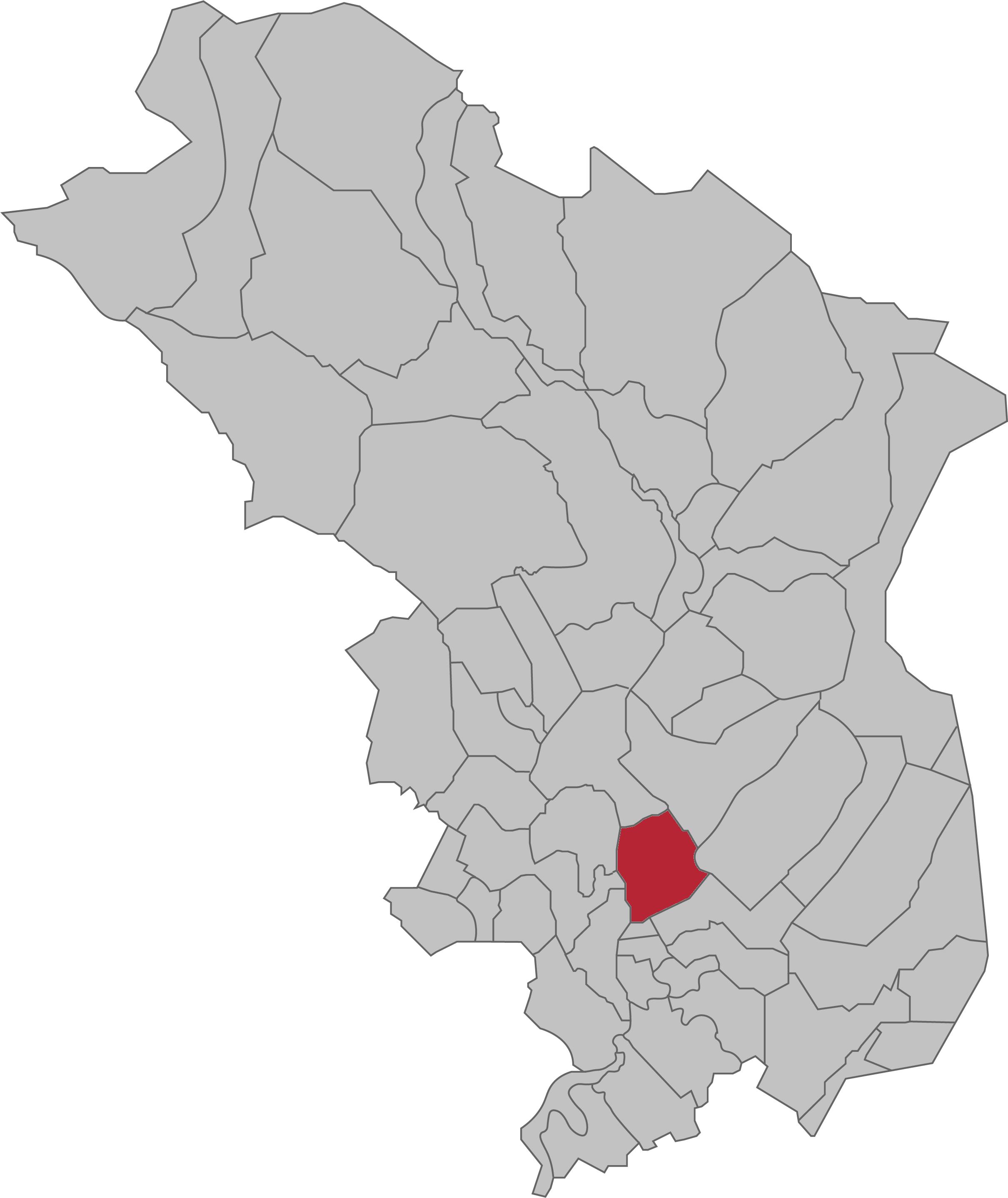
The location of Gnojnice within the City of Mostar

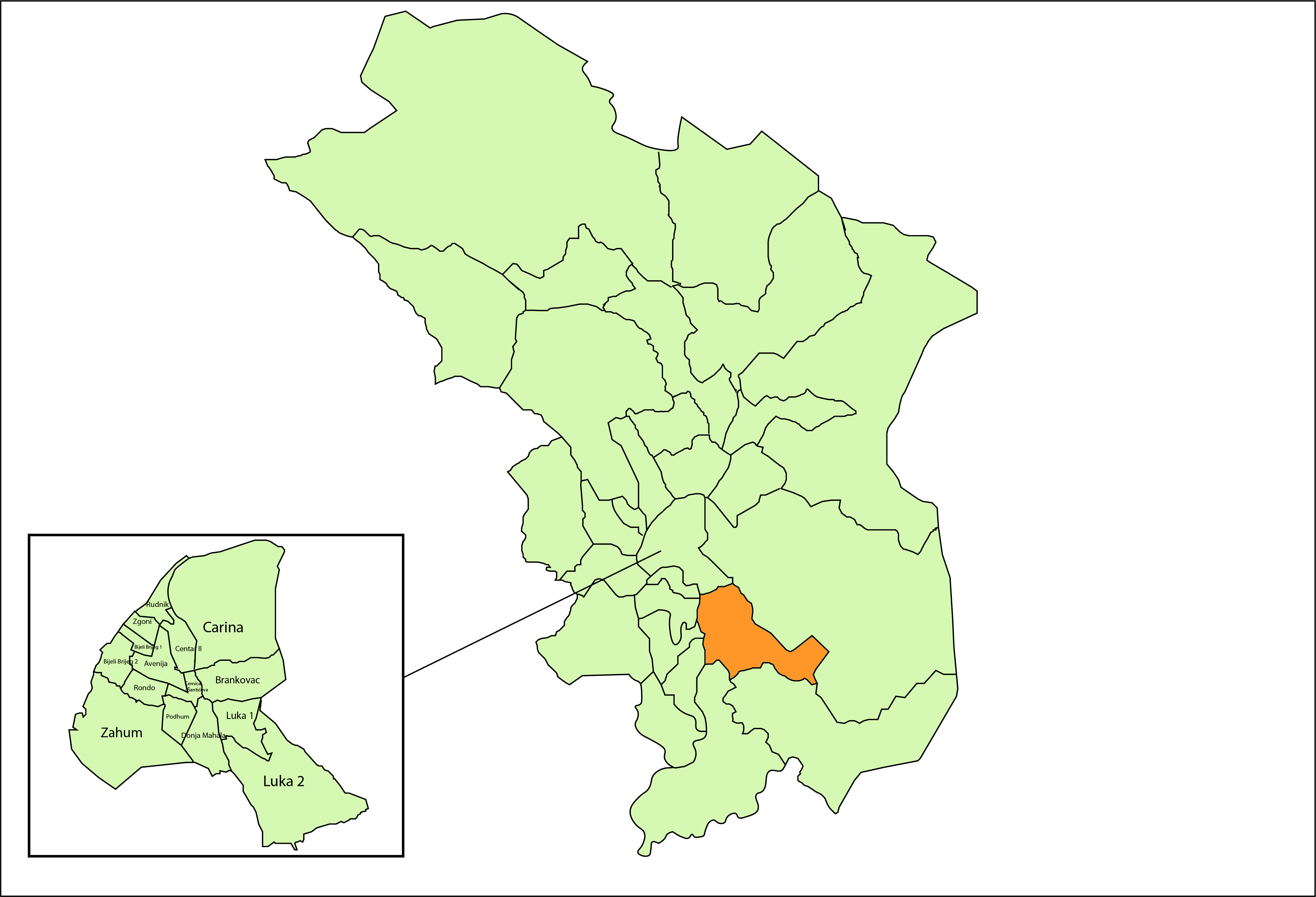
The local community of Gnojnice-Dračvevice

Gnojnice is a suburb in the City of Mostar, Bosnia and Herzegovina. According to the 2013 census, the population was 3,637.

The M-17 road goes right through Gnojnice and connects it with other southern suburbs as well as the city neighborhood of Opine. The river Neretva forms the border to Rodoč, Jasenica and Bačevići in the west, whereas in the east the suburb borders to Gornje Gnojnice and Podveležje.

This part of the city is known for its famous vineyards, the Carski vinogradi (engl. "The Emperor's vineyards). The Mostar International airport is located in this part of the greater city area.

Most of Gnojnice is part of the Southeastern metropolitan area, only its southwestern outskirts are part of the Southwestern area.

== Geography ==
Gnojnice is located in the Bišće polje, just as most of the other southern Mostar suburbs. The Bišće polje is one of the three valleys (the Bijelo polje in the north, the Mostar valley and the Bišće polje in the south) forming the territory of Mostar and its surroundings. Flat and fertile land dominated in Gnojnice, due to its proximity to the Neretva river.

The Neretva is the western natural border of Gnojnice. On the other bank of the river, from north to south, Rodoč, Jasenica and Bačevići are located. To the south, the suburb borders to Dračevice and Ortiješ, and in the east to Gornje Gnojnice and the Podveležje region. The city neighborhoods of Luka and Opine are in the north.

Gnojnice itself consists of the following parts: Gnojnice, Kadijevići, Kočine, Gorica and Masline.

== History ==
In Gnojnice, there are still traces from the ancient Roman periods, most importantly an old system for water redistribution.

In modern times, the Austro-Hungarian reign over Bosnia and Herzegovina (1878-1918) brought great improvements regarding the development of Gnojnice. It was in this very part of the Herzegovina, in 1886, that the first buying station for wine was opened. The investments in the infrastructure for winegrowing were followed by better education, as many winegrowers would send their children to educate themselves about viniculture in Vienna. The products from the Gnojnice vineyards, as well as the products of winegrowers from Lastva near Trebinje, would soon even become consumed among the European nobility. This made the local population starting to refer to these two locations as "the Emperor's vineyards".

During the Yugoslovian era, Gnojnice became important for another development: aviation. In 1935, The Yugoslovian army built an airfield in this part of the Greter Mostar area for the needs of its Royal Air Force. Later, in the period of the socialist Yugoslavia (1945-1992), it was mainly used by the military aircraft producer Soko (located in nearby Rodoc) to test its airplanes. In 1971, the Yugoslav People's Army enhanced its site by building an underground air base (called "Buna") under the airfield. Later, the airport was opened to civil aviation. First only available for domestic flights, the Gnojnice airfield finally developed to an international airport thanks to the Sarajevo Winter Olympics in 1984. Hosting this important sports event led to an increased number of flights to Yugoslavia and subsequently for a greater need for civil aviation infrastructure. Due to the relative proximity to the Bosnian capital, the location in Mostar was seen as an alternative for the very busy Sarajevo airport. During the Bosnian war (1992-1995), the Mostar airport was used by peacekeeping forces. It was handed back to Bosnian government authorities in 1998.

The development of this part of the Herzegovina region was tightly connected to the company Hepok (abbreviation for "Hercegovački poljoprivredni kombinat" or "Herzegovinian agricultural combinate" in English). Founded in 1956, it was decided to build its headquarters and production facilities there. It was especially the winegrowing that experienced a great expansion, the landscape south of Mostar is dominated by vineyards to this day. Hepok is among the few big Yugoslav companies from Mostar to have survived the transition towards a free-market economy, being a private-owned company today.

Gnojnice was also very affected by the Bosnian war from 1992 to 1995. In April 1992, the Yugoslav people's army (JNA) succeeded in occupying the southern Mostar suburbs, gaining control over the Mostar airport and the roads towards the southern Herzegovina and Croatia. Later, the JNA handed its positions over to the armed forces of the separatist Bosnian serbs, the Army of the Republika Srpska (VRS), including territories in the northern and eastern city area. As a result, their leadership had the means to block communication towards the Bosnian capital Sarajevo, Eastern Herzegovina and Čapljina, and was in control over Mostar's airport and rail network, putting the state-held part of the city under a partial blockade.

The Serbs lost Gnojnice in June 1992, when joined Bosnian-Croat forces managed to retain control over Mostar and most of its surroundings in the Operation June Dawns.

After its liberation, it was under control of the 7. battalion of the Croatian defence council (HVO), the armed forces of the Bosnian Croats. Although the commanding structures were mostly Croat, a great number of soldiers were Bosniaks - a characteristic for this part of the Herzegovinian battlefield. On the 9th May 1993, after the HVO attacked the Bosnian state Army (ARBiH), the Croat-bosniak war in Mostar began. Bosniaks who were in the Croat forces left them, considering them now as hostile, and joined the state army. Most of the soldiers in this part of the Mostar area became part of the 48. brigade of the 4 corps of the Bosnian army, fighting against the second HVO battalion. During the battles, the main front line went through Gnojnice.

As a result of the war, a lot of Bosniak war refugees - from Eastern Herzegovina and the Podveležje region - find refuge in this suburb, which changed the demographic make-up of Gnojnice.

== Demographics ==
According to the 2013 census, its population was 3,637.

Ethnicity in 2013
Ethnicity	Number	Percentage
Bosniaks	3,276	90.1%
Croats	205	5.6%
Serbs	93	2.6%
other/undeclared	63	1.7%
Total	3,637	100%

Gnojnice
years	1991	1981	1971
Bosniaks	1.028 (46,49%)	794 (43,79%)	413 (31,33%)
Croats	670 (30,30%)	651 (35,90%)	646 (49,01%)
Serbs	386 (17,45%)	284 (15,66%)	247 (18,74%)
Yugoslavs	52 (2,35%)	77 (4,24%)	1 (0,07%)
others	75 (3,39%)	7 (0,38%)	11 (0,83%)
total	2.211	1.813	1.318

== Economy ==
Agriculture is a very important sector for the economy of Gnojnice, especially viniculture. The most known company from the area is HEPOK Mostar.

The service sector is also a part of the local economy which shows great development. Prove for this is the "Bišće polje" business zone between Gnojnice and the city area, which has attracted a lot of companies from commerce, gastronomy and the hotel industry.

The Mostar airport, located in the southern part of Gnojnice, is also of great importance.

== Infrastructure ==
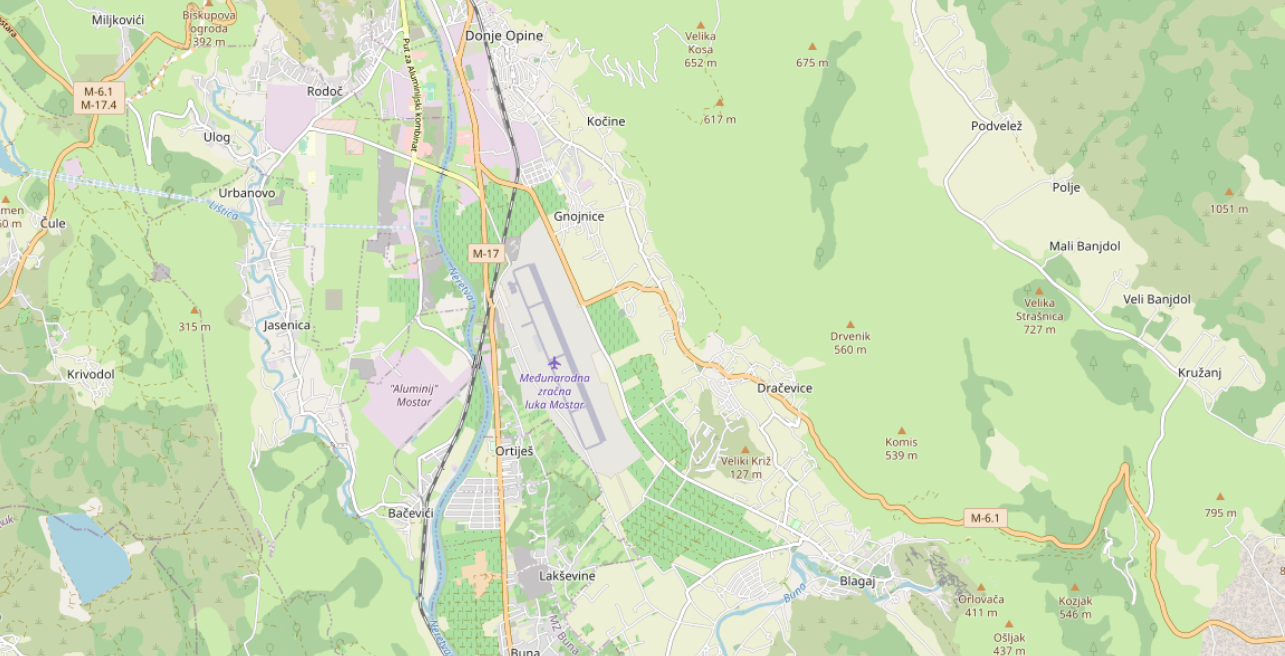
A map of Gnojnice

The M-17 road, which connects Mostar with Sarajevo and the Croatian coast, goes through Gnojnice. The Sarajevo-Ploče railway is also crossing Gnojnice, but the first train station is located downtown, about seven kilometers away.

Mostarbus, the local bus company, maintains several routes (6, 10, 12, 13, 16, 28 and 29, as of September 2023) that head towards city centre and other southern Mostar suburbs.

=== Public facilities ===
Regarding the public infrastructure, Gnojnice has one elementary school and an outpatient clinic of the Mostar Old Town Health Center (bos. Dom zdravlja "Stari Grad" Mostar).

== Gallery ==
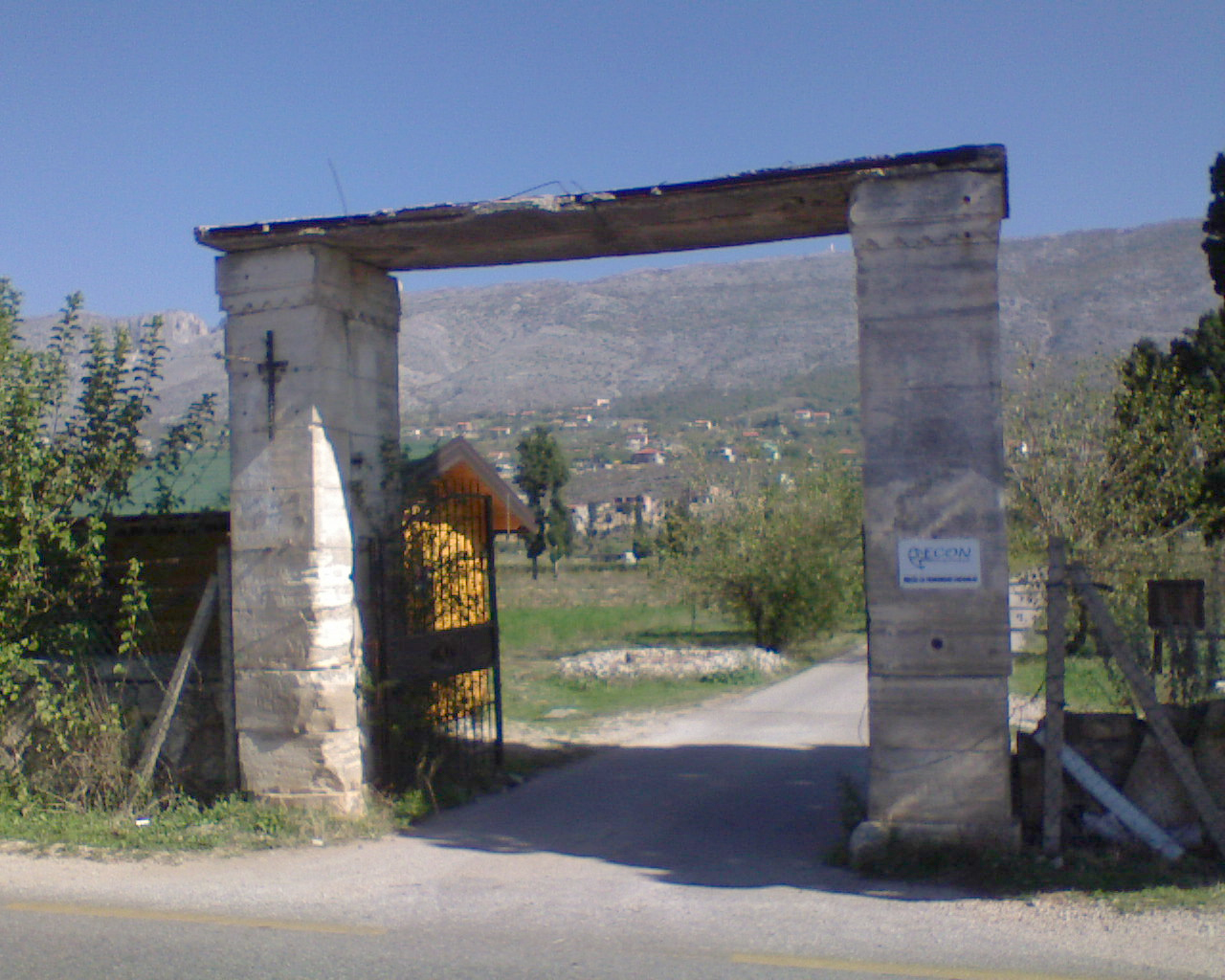
