= Air Force and Anti-Aircraft Defence of Bosnia and Herzegovina =

Air warfare branch of Bosnia's military forces

Air Force and Air Defence Brigade of Bosnia and Herzegovina
- Brigada Zračne snage i protivzračne odbrane (Bosnian); Бригада ваздушне снаге и противваздухопловна одбрана (Serbian)
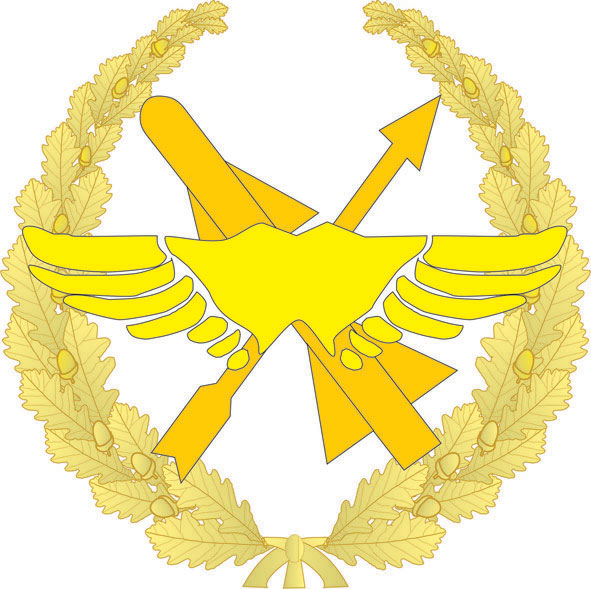
- Founded: 1 December 2006; 19 years ago
- Country: Bosnia and Herzegovina
- Type: Air force
- Role: Aerial defence Aerial warfare
- Size: 700 airmen; 300+ civilian personnel; 1,100 guard personnel
- Part of: Armed Forces of Bosnia and Herzegovina
- Headquarters: Sarajevo
- Mottos: Perspektiva; "Perspective"
- Colours: Ultramarine Blue and Golden Yellow

Insignia
- Fin flash

Aircraft flown
- Attack: Baykar Bayraktar TB2
- Helicopter: Aérospatiale Gazelle, Bell UH-1 Iroquois, Mil Mi-8, Mil Mi-17

The Air Force and Air Defence Brigade of Bosnia and Herzegovina (Bosnian: Brigada zračne snage i protivzračne odbrane Bosne i Hercegovine; Croatian: Brigada zračne snage i protuzračne obrane Bosne i Hercegovine; Serbian: Бригада ваздушне снаге и противваздухопловна одбрана Босне и Херцеговине, romanized: Brigada vazdušne snage i protivvazduhoplovna odbrana Bosne i Hercegovine) is part of the Armed Forces of Bosnia and Herzegovina. The headquarters is in Sarajevo. It maintains operating bases at Sarajevo International Airport, Banja Luka International Airport and Tuzla International Airport.

== History ==
The Air Force and Anti-Aircraft Defence Brigade of Bosnia and Herzegovina was formed when elements of the Army of the Federation of Bosnia and Herzegovina and the Republika Srpska Air Force were merged in 2006.

Bosnia and Herzegovina is in talks to acquire Bayraktar TB2 drones from Turkey.

The United States Department of State approved Bosnia and Herzegovina's requested military sale of AgustaWestland AW119 Koala latest Kx model helicopters, related equipment and services for up to five years for $100 million on May 21, 2025.

== Structure ==
- Air Force and Air Defense Brigade, at Sarajevo Air Base and Banja Luka Air Base
  - 1st Helicopter Squadron, at Banja Luka Air Base
  - 2nd Helicopter Squadron, at Sarajevo Air Base
  - Air Defence Battalion, at Sarajevo Air Base
  - Early Warning and Surveillance Battalion, at Banja Luka Air Base
  - Flight Support Battalion, with detachments at the two air bases

== Airbases ==
- Banja Luka International Airport
- Sarajevo International Airport
- Tuzla International Airport

=== Aircraft ===
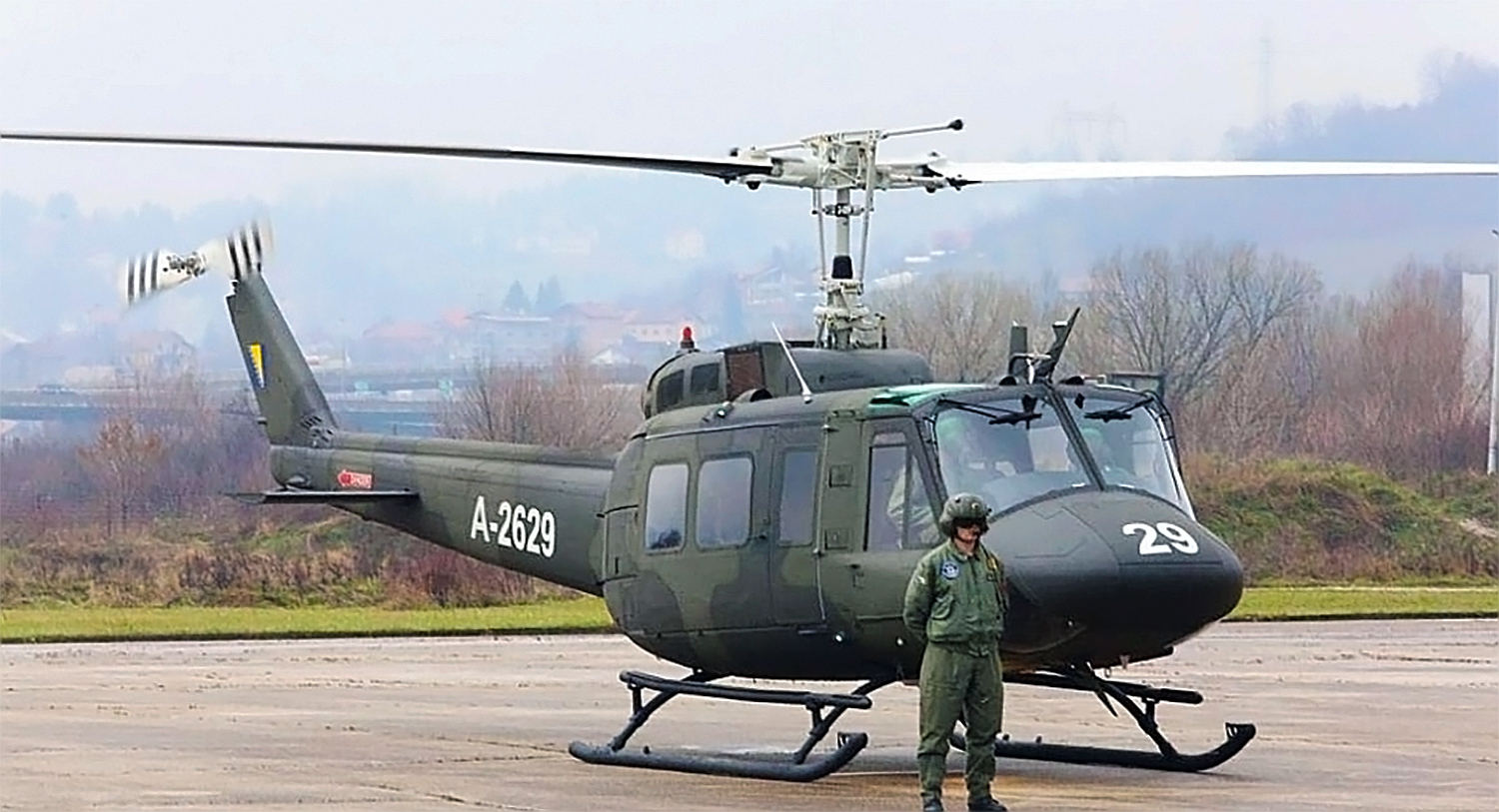
A Bosnian Bell Huey II TH-1H presented at Rajlovac Air Force Base.

Planned procurement of 6 Baykar Bayraktar TB2 UCAV.

Aircraft	Origin	Type	Variant	In service	Notes
Helicopters
Mil Mi-8	Soviet Union / Russia	Utility	Mi-8MTV	4	
Mil Mi-8	Soviet Union / Russia	Transport	Mi-8 Hip	8	
Mil Mi-17	Soviet Union	Utility	Mi-17 Hip H	1	
Bell UH-1	United States	Transport	UH-1H Iroquois	6	2 used for MEDEVAC
Bell UH-1	United States	Transport	UH-1H Huey II	3	One in store
Aérospatiale Gazelle	France	Utility	SA341H	1	
Aérospatiale Gazelle	France	Utility	SA341L	3	
UAVs
Baykar Bayraktar TB2	Turkey	UCAV		2	4 ordered.

Bosnia approved a multi-year military modernization through 2032, covering helicopters, gear, and 46 new vehicles to replace its outdated M113 A2 fleet.

=== Retired ===
Previous notable aircraft operated by the Air Force consisted of the UTVA 75, CASA C-212 Aviocar, Mil Mi-34, Mil Mi-24, Soko J-22 Orao, Soko G-2 Galeb, Soko G-4 Super Galeb, and the Bell 206 helicopter.

=== Air defense ===
Name	Origin	Type	In service	Notes
SAM
2K12 Kub	Soviet Union	Mobile SAM system	20	
9K31 Strela-1	Soviet Union	Mobile SAM system	34	
9K35 Strela-10	Soviet Union	Mobile SAM system	N/A	
M53/59 Praga	Czechoslovakia	SPAAG	96	
9K34 Strela-3	Soviet Union	MANPADS	N/A	
FIM-92 Stinger	United States	MANPADS	N/A	
9K38 Igla	Soviet Union	MANPADS	N/A	
Anti-aircraft artillery
Bofors 40 mm gun	Sweden	Anti-aircraft gun	47	31 L/60, 16 L/70
ZU-23-2	Soviet Union	Anti-aircraft gun	30	
Anti-UAV - Electronic warfare
Kangal FPV	Turkey	Jamming/Blunt (Jammer) System	N/A	Anti-drone jammer system

== See also ==
- Armed Forces of Bosnia and Herzegovina
