= UTVA 75 =

Serbian light utility aircraft

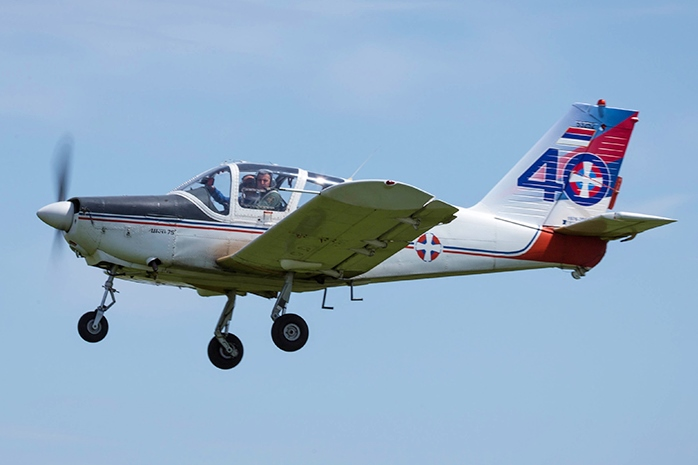
- Serbian Air Force UTVA 75

General information
- Type: Military and civilian trainer aircraft
- National origin: Yugoslavia
- Manufacturer: UTVA
- Status: Active
- Primary user: Serbia Air Force

History
- Introduction date: 1978
- First flight: 19 May 1976

The UTVA 75 is a light utility aircraft produced by the Yugoslav, and later Serbian, aircraft manufacturer Utva. It was first introduced in the late 1970s and has since been used primarily for training, reconnaissance, and light transport roles. Known for its reliability and versatility, the UTVA 75 has been adopted by several military and civilian operators around the world.

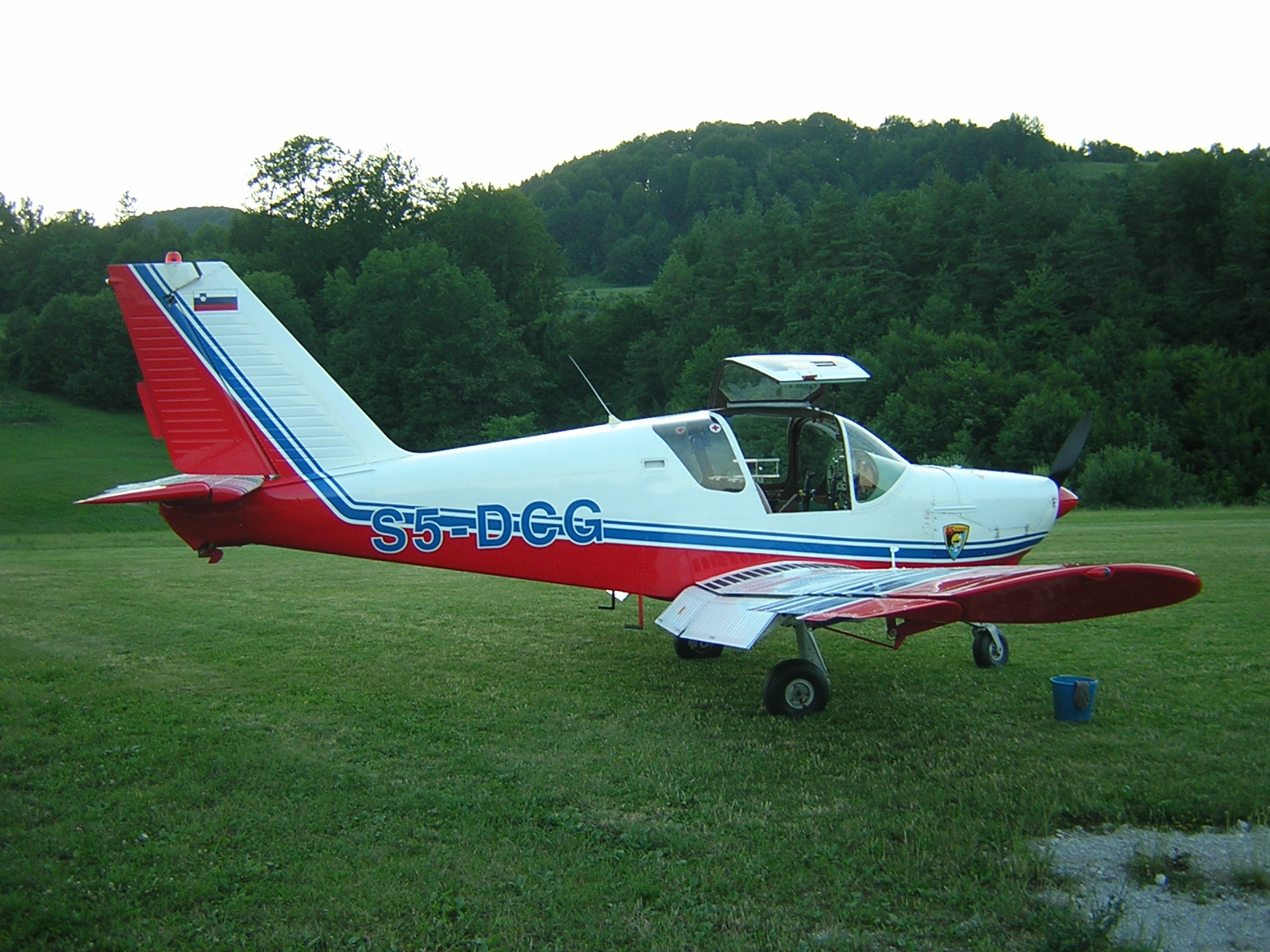
A Slovenian Utva 75

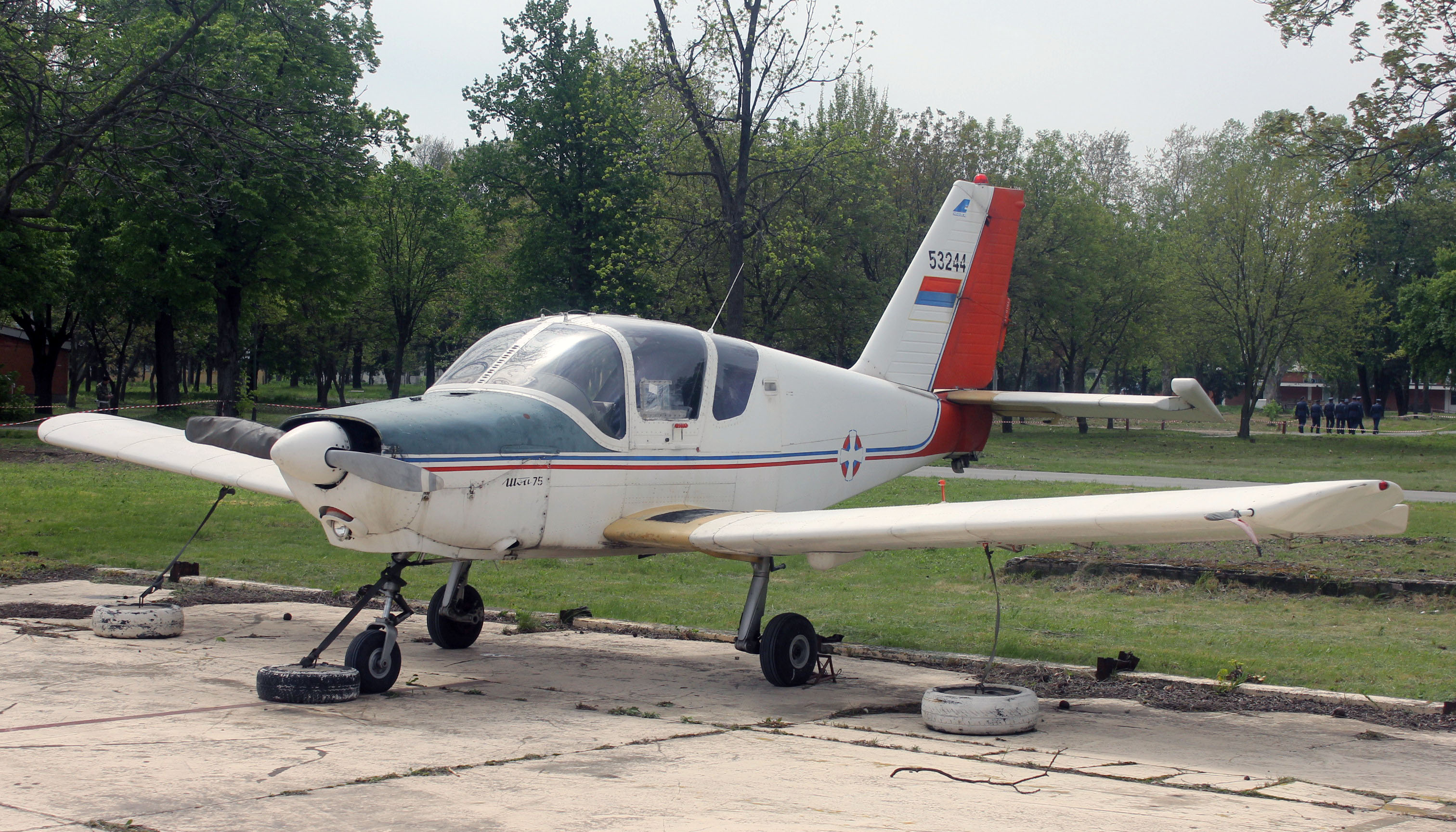
A Serbian Air Force Utva 75

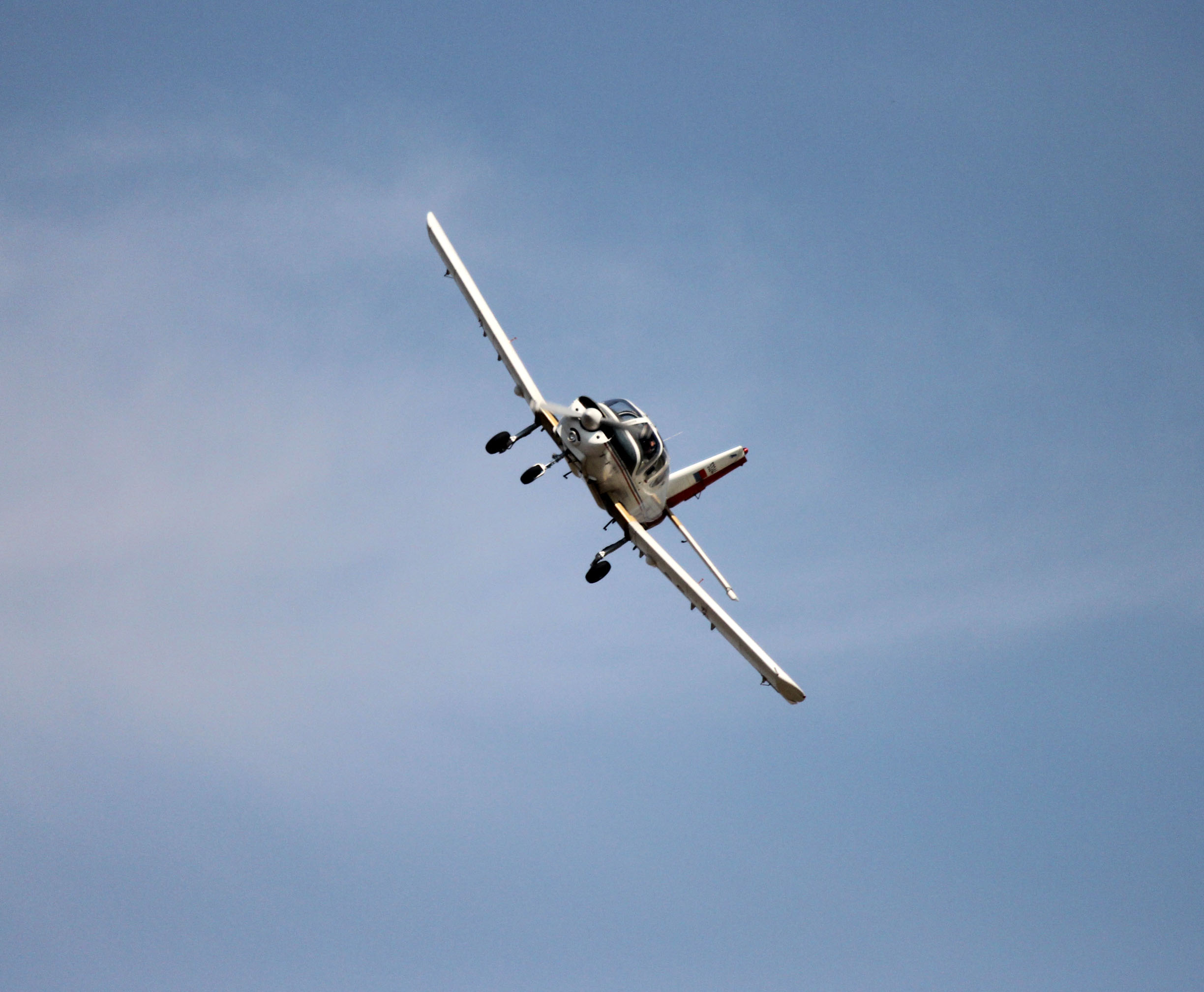
A Serbian Air Force Utva 75

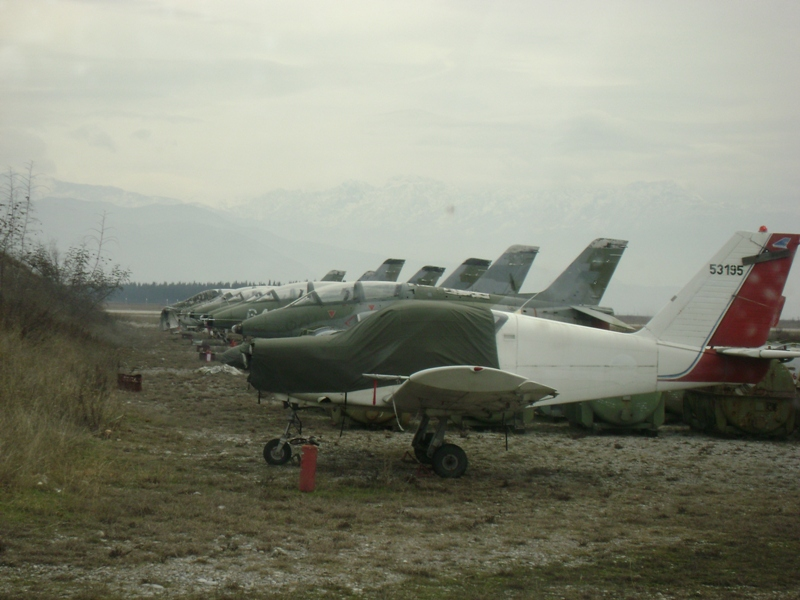
A Montenegrin Air Force Utva 75

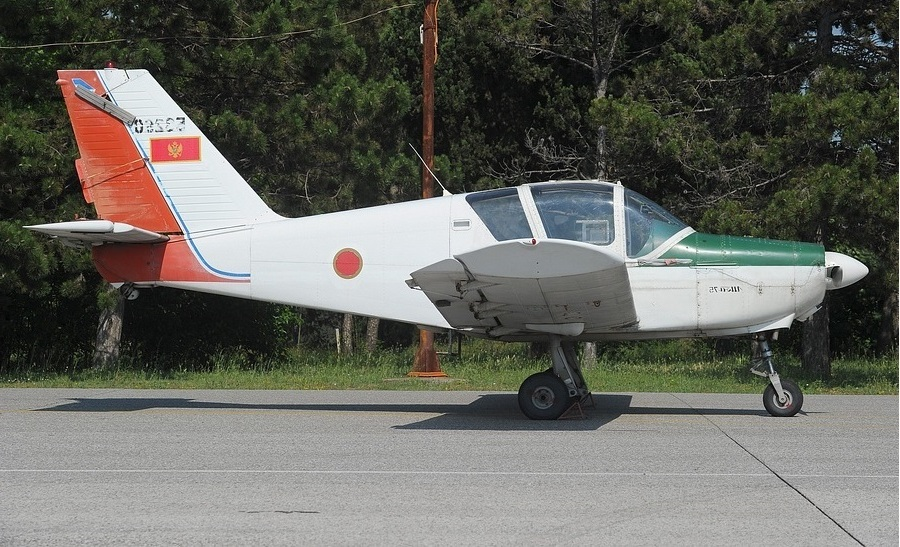
A Montenegrin Utva 75

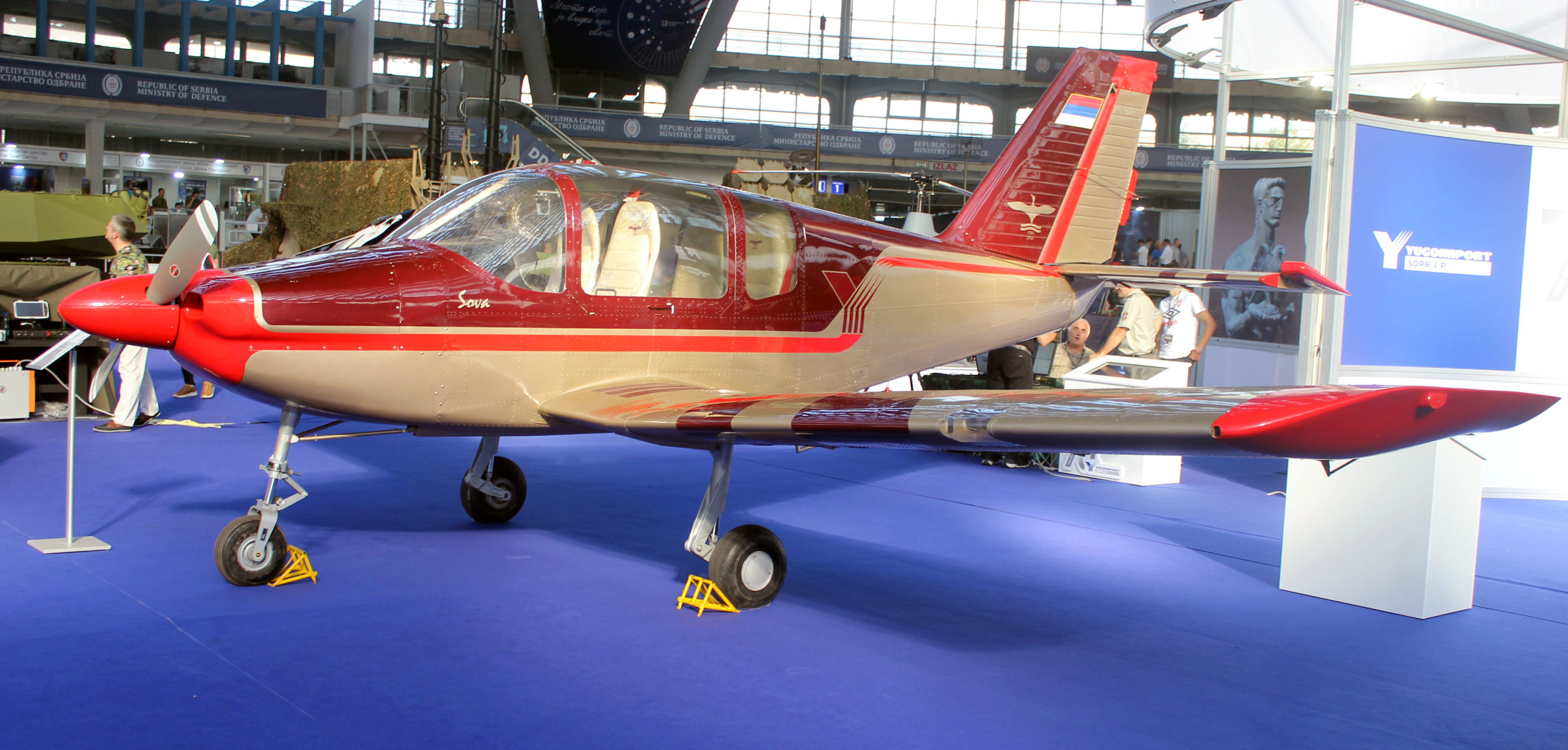
The Utva Sova, a further development of the model

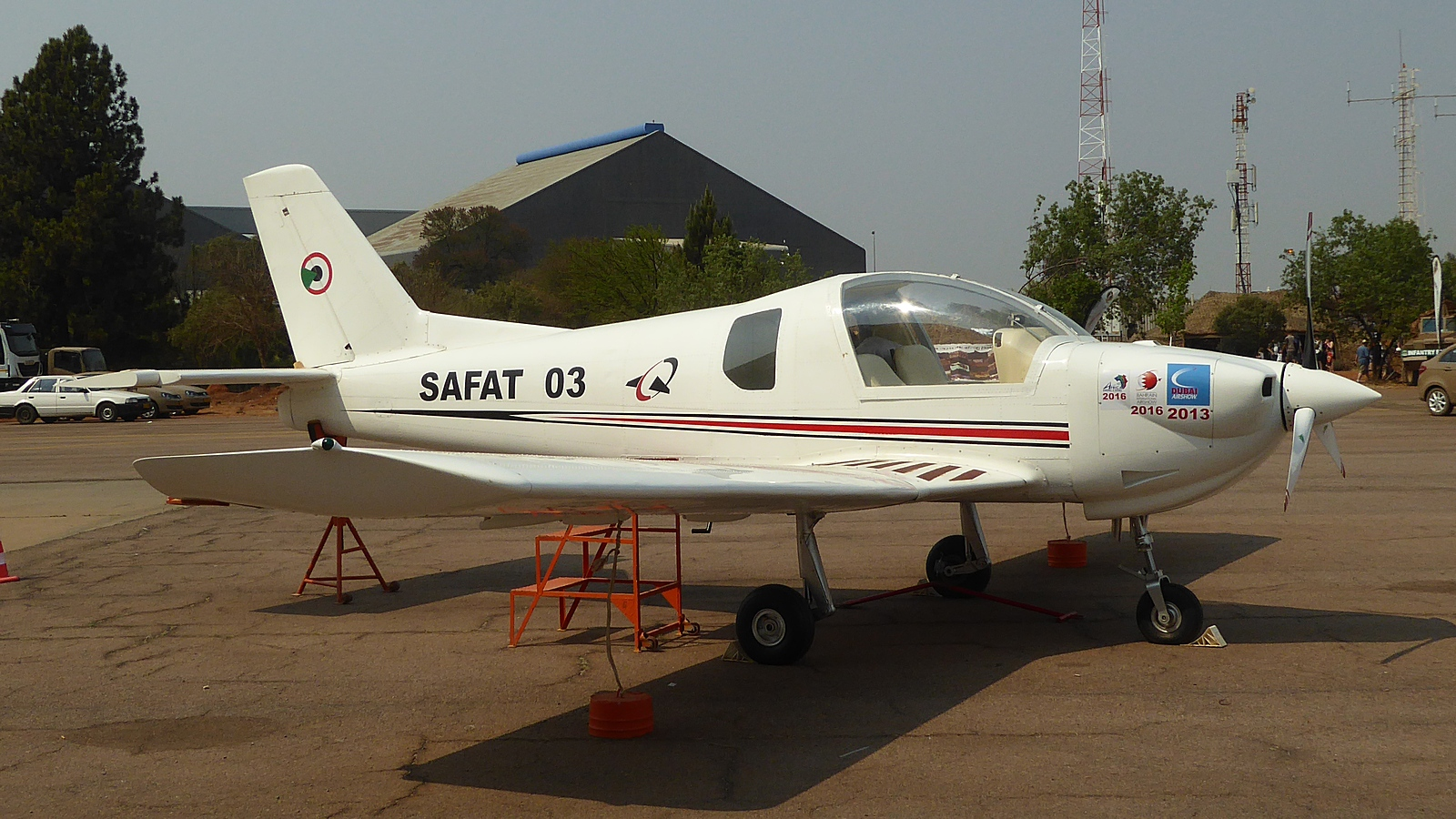
The sole SAFAT 03 prototype, developed from the UTVA 75

Designed in the early 1970s to replace the UTVA Aero 3 as the Yugoslav Air Force's primary basic trainer, it features upward opening gull-wingtype access doors to the two-seat side-by-side cockpit. Another characteristic is a row of air scoops, presumably for cockpit ventilation, in the central front frame of the cockpit. The Utva 75 made its maiden flight in 1976. Between 1978 and 1985, a total of 136 aircraft were produced for the Yugoslav Air Force. Following the breakup of Yugoslavia, many were passed on to successor states such as Serbia, Slovenia, Croatia and Montenegro. Over the years, the type has seen various upgrades and modifications to enhance its performance and capabilities.

== Development ==
The UTVA 75 features a fully metallic, semi-monocoque airframe, which provides structural strength and durability. The aircraft is powered by a Lycoming O-360 engine, capable of delivering 210 horsepower. This engine configuration allows the aircraft to achieve a maximum speed of 209 km/h (113 knots) and a service ceiling of 4,178 meters (13,708 feet).

The low-wing design of the UTVA 75 contributes to its stability and maneuverability, which are essential for training and acrobatic maneuvers. The fixed landing gear ensures reliability and reduces maintenance complexity, making it easier for training operations. The cabin is ergonomically designed, featuring adjustable seats and pedals, and provides ample room for both pilots, enhancing comfort during long training sessions.

== Design ==
The UTVA 75 is designed as a low-wing monoplane, emphasizing simplicity and robustness, ideal for training and light utility roles. Here are some detailed aspects of its design and development:

=== Airframe and Structure ===
The UTVA 75 features an all-metal construction, primarily using aluminum alloys, which provides a good balance between strength and weight. The low-wing configuration offers excellent visibility for the pilots, which is particularly beneficial during training flights and reconnaissance missions. The aircraft's fixed tricycle landing gear is designed to be sturdy and reliable, capable of operating from both paved runways and rough airstrips.

=== Powerplant ===
The aircraft is powered by a single Lycoming IO-360 engine, a four-cylinder, air-cooled, horizontally opposed piston engine. This engine produces 180 horsepower, providing the UTVA 75 with sufficient power for its various roles. The engine is equipped with a two-blade fixed-pitch propeller, which is simple to maintain and operate.

=== Cockpit and Avionics ===
The cockpit of the UTVA 75 is designed for two occupants, typically a student and an instructor in a side-by-side seating arrangement. This setup allows for effective communication and instruction during training flights. The aircraft is equipped with dual flight controls, ensuring that both the student and the instructor can operate the aircraft.

The avionics suite in the UTVA 75 is relatively basic, reflecting its primary role as a training aircraft. However, it includes all necessary instruments for VFR (Visual Flight Rules) flight, such as airspeed indicator, altimeter, vertical speed indicator, and a standard set of engine gauges. Some variants may be equipped with additional avionics for specific roles, such as navigation aids for the reconnaissance variant.

== Operational history ==
=== Performance and Handling ===
The UTVA 75 is designed to be a stable and forgiving aircraft, making it an excellent platform for primary flight training. Its low-wing configuration and moderate wing loading provide good low-speed handling characteristics and short takeoff and landing capabilities. The aircraft's control surfaces are large and responsive, contributing to its easy handling and maneuverability.

=== Modifications and Upgrades ===
Over the years, the UTVA 75 has seen several modifications and upgrades to enhance its performance and adapt it to different roles. These modifications include reinforced landing gear for rough-field operations, additional fuel tanks for extended range, and various mission-specific equipment such as cameras and crop-dusting apparatus.

=== Operational Use ===
The UTVA 75 has proven to be a reliable aircraft, serving in various roles beyond primary training. It has been used for aerial reconnaissance, light transport, liaison duties, and even agricultural applications. Its simple design and robust construction have made it a favorite among operators who require a dependable and easy-to-maintain aircraft.

Overall, the design of the UTVA 75 reflects its intended purpose as a multi-role utility aircraft. Its combination of simplicity, reliability, and versatility has ensured its continued use by both military and civilian operators around the world.

== Variants ==
UTVA 75A11
Single-seat agricultural aircraft, largely using the Utva 75 airframe.
UTVA-75A21
Two-seater with dual controls and provisions for blind instrument flying.
UTVA-75A41
Four-seater with advanced avionics, first flown in 1986.
SAFAT 03
A development of the UTVA 75 from the SAFAT Aviation Complex at Khartoum, Sudan, with a modified fuselage and tail fin. To confuse matters the Sudanese Government marked up a standard UTVA 75 as a SAFAT 03. One example known, which was displayed at the Dubai Air Show in 2011.

== Operators ==
Bosnia and Herzegovina

- Air Force and Anti-Aircraft Defence of Bosnia and Herzegovina

Croatia

- Croatian Air Force

Montenegro

- Montenegrin Air Force

North Macedonia

- North Macedonia Air Brigade

Republika Srpska

- Republika Srpska Air Force → Passed on to Bosnia-Herzegovina in 2006

Serbia

- Serbian Air Force

Slovenia

- Slovenian Air Force → Handed over entirely to aeroclubs for use
- Letalski center Maribor → Civil operator (1989–2022)

Somaliland

- Somaliland Armed Forces → Four purchased for civilian aviation and military purposes.

Sudan

- Sudanese Air Force

Yugoslavia

- Yugoslav Air Force → Partially handed over for use to aeroclubs

== Specifications (UTVA 75A21) ==
Data from Jane's All the World's Aircraft 1988-89

General characteristics

- Crew: 2
- Capacity: 210 kg (460 lb) max
- Length: 7.11 m (23 ft 4 in)
- Wingspan: 9.73 m (31 ft 11 in)
- Height: 3.15 m (10 ft 4 in)
- Wing area: 14.63 m^{2} (157.5 sq ft)
- Aspect ratio: 6.5
- Empty weight: 685 kg (1,510 lb) equipped
- Max takeoff weight: 960 kg (2,116 lb)
- Fuel capacity: standard:160 L (42 US gal; 35 imp gal): with drop tanks 360 L (95 US gal; 79 imp gal)
- Powerplant: 1 × Lycoming IO-360-B1F 4-cyl. air-cooled horizontally-opposed piston engine, 134 kW (180 hp)
- Propellers: 2-bladed Hartzell HC-C2YK-1BF/F7666A variable-pitch metal propeller

Performance

- Maximum speed: 215 km/h (134 mph, 116 kn)
- Cruise speed: 165 km/h (103 mph, 89 kn)
- Stall speed: 95 km/h (59 mph, 51 kn) flaps up at idle

82 km/h (51 mph; 44 kn) 25° flap at idle

- Never exceed speed: 270 km/h (168 mph, 146 kn)
- Range: 800 km (500 mi, 430 nmi)
- Ferry range: 2,000 km (1,200 mi, 1,100 nmi)
- Service ceiling: 4,000 m (13,000 ft)
- g limits: +4.4 -2.2
- Rate of climb: 4.5 m/s (890 ft/min)
- Takeoff distance to 50 ft (15 m): 501 m grass at Sea Level
- Landing distance from 50 ft (15 m): 450 m grass at Sea Level

Armament

- Hardpoints: 2 with a capacity of 150 kg (330 lb) each, with provisions to carry combinations of:
  - Rockets: 2 × RL 128-02 128 mm (HVAR-5), or 2 × 57 millimetres (2.2 in) rocket launchers with 12 rockets
  - Bombs: 2 × 120 kg bombs, or 4 × 50 kg bombs
  - Other: 2 × MAC-AA-52 container with 7.62 mm, or 2 × cargo container 100 kg capacity, or 2 × drop tanks

' Avionics

- standard (model 75) KING KR85 ADF and KING KY 195B
- optional (model 75A catalog only) KING KR87 ADF, RNAV KING KNS81 VOR/LOC: KING KN 53, KING KY 197 Indicators: HSI KING KI 525A, and RMI KING KI 229, DME:KING KN 62A, Transponder: KING KT 79, Audio panel: KING KMA 24

== See also ==
- Utva 66

Aircraft of comparable role, configuration, and era

- Zlin Z 142
