= Lumiwings =

Greek airline

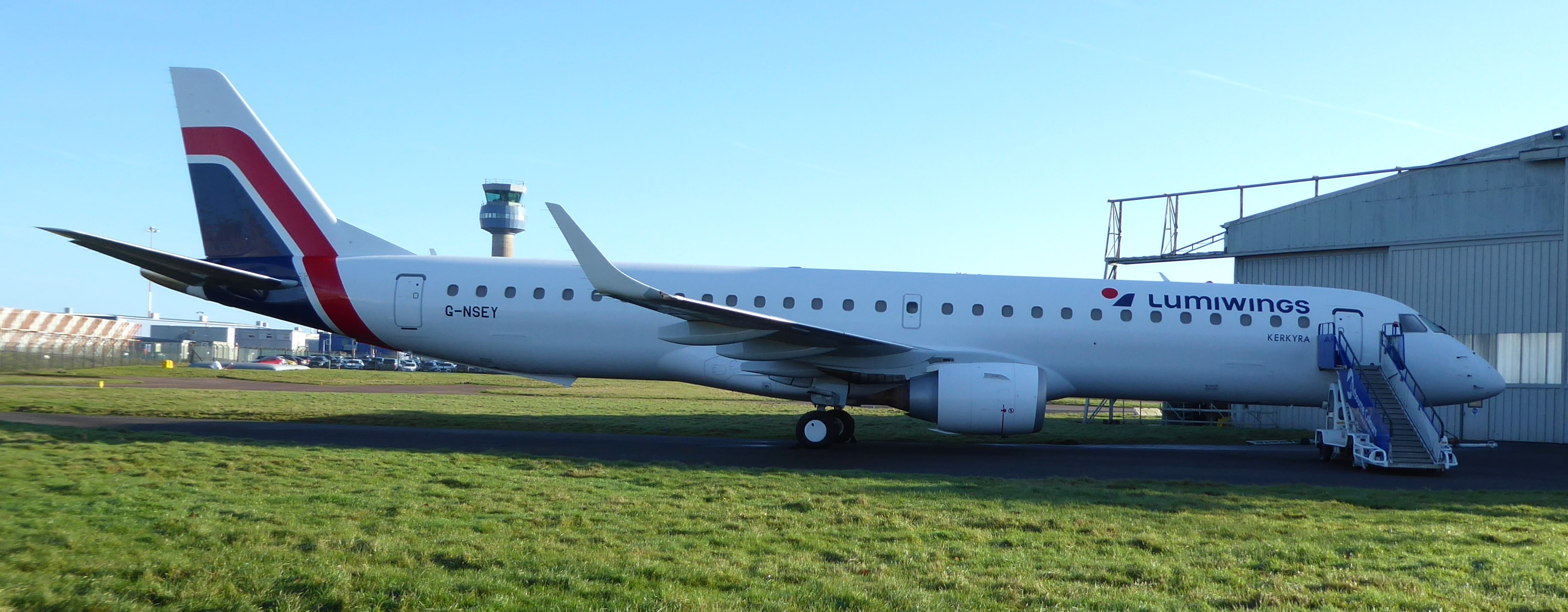
- Lumiwings Embraer 190
IATA	ICAO	Call sign
L9	LWI	LUMI
- Founded: 11 December 2015
- Commenced operations: 2018
- Ceased operations: September 2025
- Hubs: Foggia Airport
- Fleet size: 2
- Destinations: 4
- Headquarters: Markopoulo, Athens
- Employees: 36 (2022)
- Website: lumiwings.com

Lumiwings was a Greek airline based at Foggia Gino Lisa Airport which operated charter and scheduled services.

== History ==
Lumiwings was founded in December 2015 in Athens by Efthimios Zacharias and Dimitris Kremiotis, former pilots of Astra Airlines. Flight operations began in 2018 on behalf of Astra Airlines using a Boeing 737-300 on a one-year lease.

After Astra Airlines closed in 2019, Lumiwings became independent and operated charter flights for tour operators and subcharters for other airlines.

In 2021, Lumiwings started offering scheduled flights from its base in Foggia to destinations in Italy and Eastern Europe.

In September 2025, Lumiwings sole aircraft was grounded by a London court due to the fact that the airline continued to operate the aircraft despite some of the lease agreement installments not being paid and the lease being terminated by the lessor. This effectively left the financially struggling airline without a functioning fleet which resulted in Lumiwings ceasing all flight operations. In October 2025, Lumiwings was ordered to return the grounded aircraft to the lessor. It was also reported that efforts are being made by Italian entrepreneurs to form a new airline out of the reclaimed assets of Lumiwings. The goal is that the new airline would be based at Foggia Gino Lisa Airport and take over the routes previously operated by Lumiwings.

== Destinations ==
As of 2024, Lumiwings served the following destinations: In February 2024, Lumiwings announced the cancellation of flights to and from Tuzla Airport, starting from 27 February.

Country or territory	City	Airport	Notes	Refs
Italy	Foggia	Foggia Airport	Hub	
Italy	Turin	Turin Airport		
Italy	Milan	Milan Malpensa Airport		
Italy	Milan	Milan Linate Airport		
Italy	Milan	Milan Bergamo Airport		

== Fleet ==
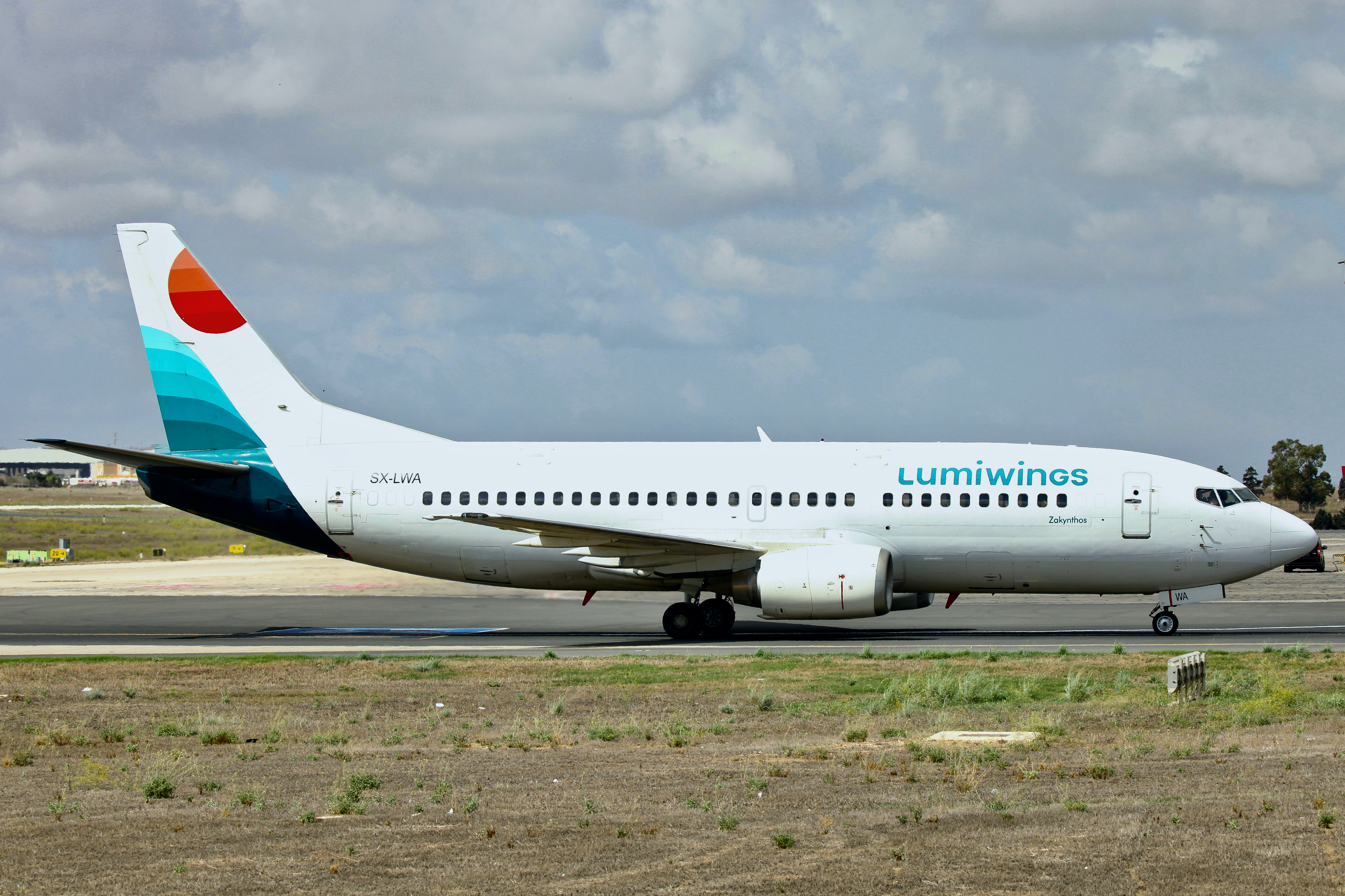
Lumiwings Boeing 737-300 in 2021

=== Current fleet ===
As of July 2026, Lumiwings operates the following aircraft:

Lumiwings fleet
Aircraft	In service	Orders	Passengers	Notes
Boeing 737-700	1	—	149	
Total	1	—		

=== Former fleet ===
As of August 2025, Lumiwings operated 1 Boeing 737-700 and 1 Embraer 190.

In the past, Lumiwings also operated the following aircraft types:

- Boeing 737-300
