= Air Commerce =

Airline of Bosnia and Herzegovina

- Founded: 28 March 1991
- Commenced operations: 1991
- Ceased operations: 1992
- Hubs: Sarajevo International Airport
- Parent company: JAT Yugoslav Airlines
- Headquarters: Sarajevo, Bosnia and Herzegovina
- Key people: Muhamed Abadžić

Air Commerce was a Yugoslav airline based at Sarajevo International Airport in Bosnia and Herzegovina. It was officially known as "AIR COMMERCE društvo za avio saobraćaj i usluge d.o.o. Sarajevo" and had its headquarters in Radićeva Street 4c, Sarajevo.

== History ==
Air Commerce was an airline based in Sarajevo, SR Bosnia and Herzegovina, then still within SFR Yugoslavia, that transported over 40,000 passengers from October 1991 until March 1992 from its hub, Sarajevo International Airport. The airline was the main contributor to the increase in passenger traffic in Sarajevo airport in that period. Its fleet consisted of two Boeing 727 leased from JAT Yugoslav Airlines, and one Yakovlev Yak-42. At some point before the beginning of the Bosnian War in 1992, Air Commerce was operating another type of plane leased from JAT, a McDonnell Douglas DC-9.

Before the establishment of Air Commerce, JAT had a monopoly over the international flights within Yugoslavia, and almost all international flights from Sarajevo were made through Belgrade and Zagreb. Air Commerce was the first private airline founded on the territory of SR Bosnia and Herzegovina, and began direct flights from Sarajevo to a dozen destinations in Europe. In 1991 and 1992, the airline was responsible for a record boost in the number of passengers passing through Sarajevo Airport. Despite this, the airline's most profitable route was between Zurich and Skopje, where the majority of passengers were Albanians. This boost in air traffic from Bosnia and other regions of Yugoslavia made it possible for Air Commerce to pay more than US$1 million in leasing payments to JAT in its first year of operation. However, with the start of the Bosnian War and Bosnia and Herzegovina's declaration of independence, the planes were delivered back to Belgrade to JAT, and the company underwent a major decrease in activity.

When the war started in 1992, the airline offered its planes to UNHCR for humanitarian purposes, but this offer was rejected, so Air Commerce found itself in a total halt.

At the end of the war, Air Commerce began operating a new, leasing a 17-seat Let L-410 Turbolet. In 1997, beside the L-140, the airline also occasionally leased bigger planes for Hajj charter flights to Saudi Arabia.

== Destinations ==
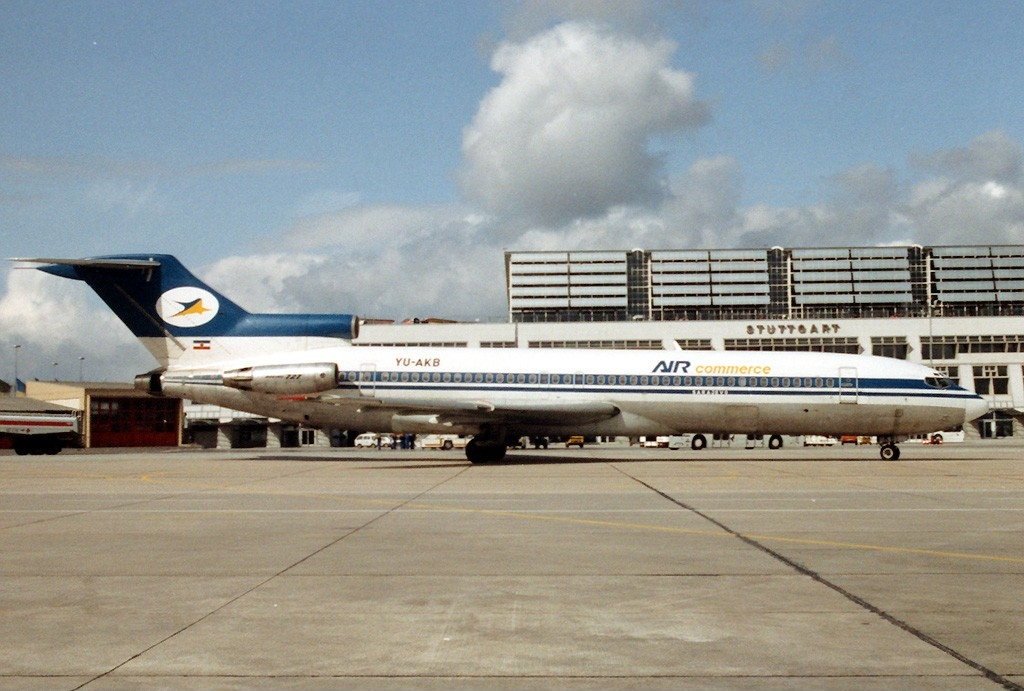
JAT Yugoslav Airlines-leased Boeing 727 in Stuttgart Airport, 1992.

The airline was offering charter flights from Sarajevo to Istanbul, Turkey and Cairo, Egypt, and scheduled flights to Switzerland and Belgrade, which began in December 1991. They also conducted scheduled flights from Sarajevo and Tuzla to Austria and Switzerland. Before the beginning of the war in Bosnia and Herzegovina, the airline also had flights between Zurich and Skopje. After the war, Air Commerce undertook charter flights to Saudi Arabia for Hajj pilgrims.

== Fleet ==
Air Commerce used JAT Yugoslav Airlines-leased Boeing 727 and McDonnell Douglas DC-9, and a Yakovlev Yak-42 leased from Donbass-Eastern Ukrainian airlines. During the mid-1990s, Air Commerce also leased a Let L-410 Turbolet.
