= Alidaunia =

Italian airline

IATA	ICAO	Call sign
D4	LID	ALIDA
- Founded: 1976; 49 years ago
- Hubs: Gino Lisa Airport
- Fleet size: 6
- Destinations: 3
- Headquarters: Foggia, Italy
- Website: alidaunia.it

Alidaunia S.r.L. is an Italian airline based in Foggia. It operates scheduled passenger services, air ambulance, air taxi/charter, offshore, aircraft maintenance, flying school and aerial work services. Its main base is Gino Lisa Airport, Foggia.

== History ==
Alidaunia was established in March 1976 and in 1978 was licensed for film and photographic work. In 1984 it received a license for public transport. With government support in 1985 it started scheduled services from Foggia to the Tremiti Islands. In 1992 and 1993 it operated on the Foggia to Milan (Malpensa) route and from 1993 to 1995 on the Foggia to Parma route using a Mitsubishi MU 300 aircraft on both routes.

The airline is owned by Roberto Pucillo (general Manager) (55%), Roberto Manzo Rocco (20%), Paulo Giangrossi (15%), Michele Perricone (5%).

== Destinations ==
Alidaunia operates the following services using helicopters (as at September 2020):

- Foggia - Gino Lisa Airport
- Tremiti Islands - San Domino Island Heliport
- Peschici - Peschici Heliport
- Vieste - Vieste Heliport

== Fleet ==
The Alidaunia fleet consisted of the following aircraft (at July 2015):

- 4 Agusta A109
- 1 Sikorsky S-76
- 1 Eurocopter BK 117 C1
- 2 AgustaWestland AW139
- 1 Robinson R22

== Incidents and accidents ==
- On November 5, 2022, an Alidaunia helicopter flying between Tremiti and Foggia crashed, killing 7, including a Slovenian couple and their 13 year old daughter.
