= Soko J-22 Orao =

Yugoslav/Serbian ground-attack and reconnaissance aircraft

J-22 Orao
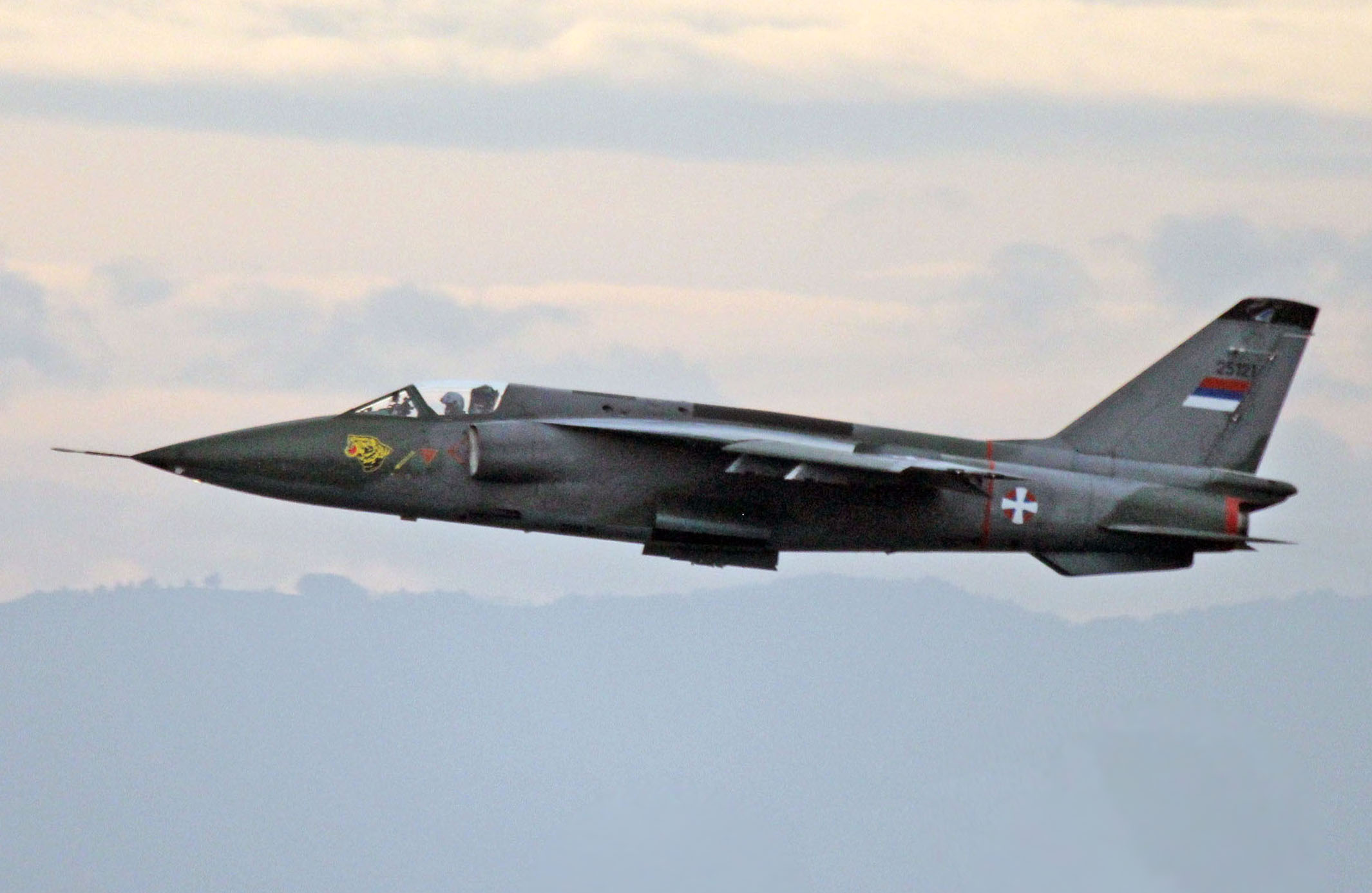
- J-22 Orao of the Serbian Air Force

General information
- Type: Attack aircraft Reconnaissance aircraft
- Manufacturer: SOKO
- Designer: VTI - Yugoslavia; INCAS - Romania
- Status: Active
- Primary users: Serbian Air Force Yugoslav Air Force (historical); Bosnian Air Force (historical); Republika Srpska Air Force (historical)

History
- Manufactured: 1974–1992
- Introduction date: 1978
- First flight: 31 October 1974
- Variant: IAR-93 Vultur

The Soko J-22 Orao (Serbian Cyrillic: Oрао, lit. 'eagle') is a Yugoslavian and later Serbian twin-engined, subsonic ground-attack and aerial reconnaissance aircraft. It was developed and built in collaboration by SOKO in Yugoslavia and by Avioane Craiova in neighbouring Romania, being known in the latter as the IAR-93 Vultur.

The Orao was designed as either a single-seat main attack version or as a combat-capable twin-seat version, the latter being principally intended for advanced flight- and weapons-training duties. It was developed as a joint Yugoslav-Romanian project, known as YuRom, during the 1970s. Early ambitions to produce a supersonic fighter were scuppered by Britain's unwillingness to permit the desired engine to be license-produced in Eastern Europe. Further difficulties in fitting an afterburner to the older Rolls-Royce Viper also hindered development and the performance of early-build aircraft.

First flying during November 1974, the resulting aircraft would equip the air forces of both Romania and Yugoslavia, as well as several of Yugoslavia's successor states. On 22 November 1984, the Orao became the first Yugoslav-designed aircraft to exceed Mach 1, albeit achieved while in a shallow dive. During the 1990s, the type saw action during the Yugoslav Wars, typically flying ground-attack missions in Croatia, Bosnia and Herzegovina, and Kosovo. As of July 2019, the Serbian Air Force and Air Defence was the only entity still operating the type.

== Development ==
=== Origins ===
During 1970, the neighbouring nations of Romania and Yugoslavia began discussions on the subject of jointly developing a new ground-attack orientated fighter aircraft. On 20 May 1971, the Romanian and Yugoslavian governments signed an agreement for the formation of YuRom, a joint research and development venture between the two nations. According to aviation author John C. Fredriksen, the announcement was a logical extension of political policy, as the two nations' heads of state, Josip Broz Tito of Yugoslavia and Nicolae Ceaușescu, had both historically sought to avoid overreliance upon the Soviet Union, preferring to build ties and cooperative projects with other friendly or neutral nations.

The research programme was headed by Dipl. Dr. Engineer Teodor Zanfirescu of Romania and Colonel Vidoje Knezević of Yugoslavia. The aircraft was intended to be a replacement for both the lightly armed Soko J-21 Jastreb and the Republic F-84 Thunderjet that were then in the Yugoslav People's Army's (JNA) arsenal. The requirements called for a lightweight aircraft that featured a relatively simple and rugged structure, that would use locally produced equipment and avionics, capable of operating from austere airstrips (including the ability to operate either from grass or damaged runways), as well as being reliable and easy to maintain.

The resulting design was of a conventional twin-engine monoplane, featuring a high-mounted wing complete with all-swept flight surfaces. According to Fredriksen, the design emphasised simplicity as well as modernity. Due to political sensitivities and a strong desire to avoid one nation upstaging the other, the aircraft featured two separate names; in Romania, it was known as the IAR-93 Vultur while in Yugoslavia it was referred to as the J-22 Orao.

The design team had originally planned to develop a single-engined aircraft capable of supersonic speeds, but the United Kingdom would not authorize the license to produce the British engine that the designers had selected; the rejection was reportedly due to Romania being a member of the Soviet-aligned Warsaw Pact. In its place, the less-powerful Rolls-Royce Viper was chosen as the powerplant, as Soko already possessed experience with license-building this engine. It was originally intended that an afterburner would be developed for the Viper engine, but there were prolonged difficulties with this project. Due to these complications, none of the pre-production aircraft or any early production examples would be equipped with afterburners; these would be largely restricted to conducting reconnaissance missions. During the 1980s, both countries developed slightly different versions of the aircraft to take advantage of the afterburning engines that had since become available.

=== Into flight ===
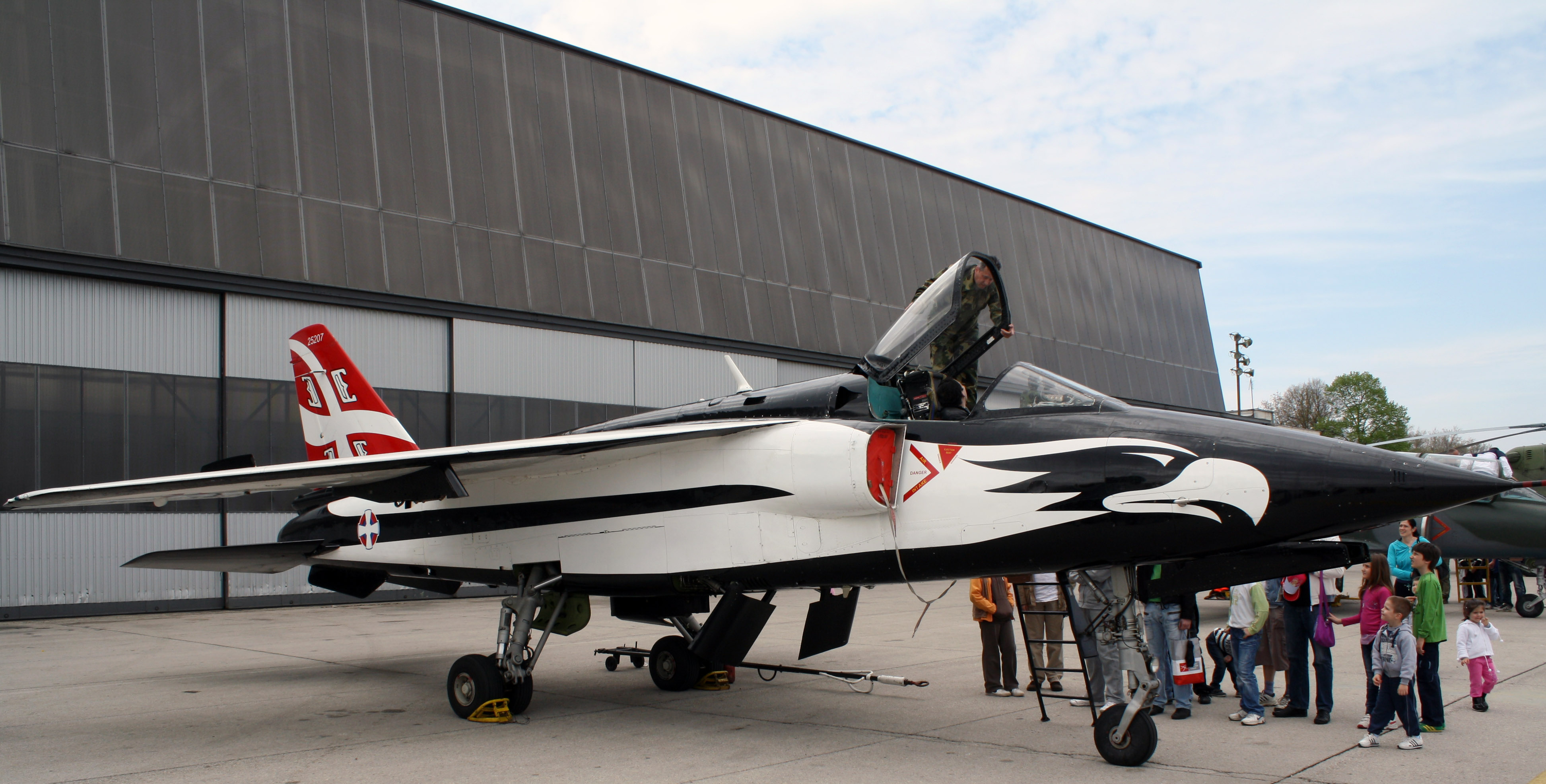
J-22 Orao on display in 2012

During 31 October 1974, the Yugoslav prototype 25002 conducted its first flight from Batajnica Air Base near Belgrade, with Major Vladislav Slavujević at the controls. For political reasons, this flight was timed to deliberately coincide with the first flight of the IAR-93 Vultur prototype. The third aircraft, numbered 25003, which was a pre-production two-seater version, performed its first flight on 4 July 1977. This aircraft was lost almost one year later, the cause of the accident was attributed to the occurrence of tail flutter.

Construction of further pre-production aircraft was unimpacted by the loss; during 1978, the first batches of pre-production machines were delivered to the Air Force Aircraft Testing Facility in Belgrade. Subsequent serial production was established at a facility outside Mostar, (now in Bosnia and Herzegovina); this facility would be abandoned in early 1992 and heavily damaged during the Yugoslav Wars. The Yugoslav Army reportedly stripped most of the equipment from the Mostar factory and transported as much as possible to the Utva facility in Pancevo, Serbia. However, in spite of this effort, volume production of the J-22 would never be resumed either in Yugoslavia or in its successor states.

During October 1983, the first afterburner-equipped J-22 Orao was flown in Yugoslavia. On 22 November 1984, an Orao No 25101 broke the sound barrier while in a shallow dive at an angle of 25 degrees, piloted by test pilot Marjan Jelen, above Batajnica airport.; this instance made the J-22 the first Yugoslav-designed aircraft to exceed Mach 1. The aircraft is incapable of breaking the sound barrier in level flight, so it is classified as being a subsonic aircraft.

== Design ==
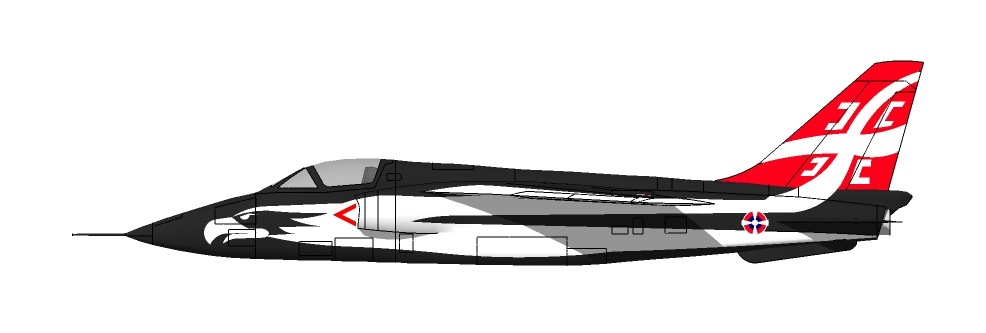
Side-on depiction of a J-22

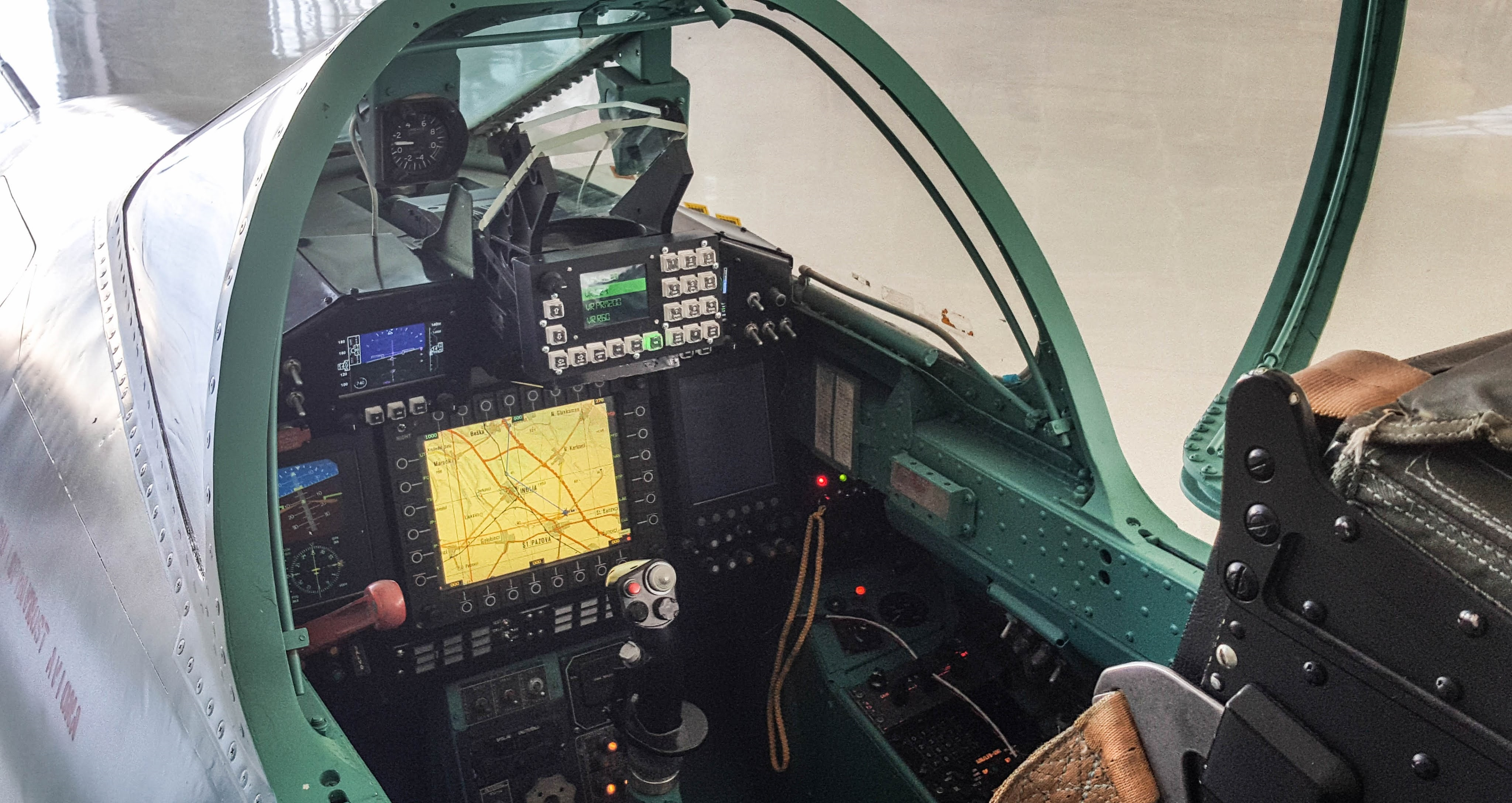
Modernised cockpit of J-22

The J-22 Orao is a twin-engined combat jet aircraft designed for performing close air support (CAS), ground-attack and tactical reconnaissance missions, it also features a limited air-defense capability. Twin-seat aircraft, designated NJ-22, were primarily intended for performing tactical reconnaissance; they were also used to train air crew, being suitable for both the advanced flight and weapons training syllabuses. In terms of its configuration, it featured a shoulder-mounted wing and a pair of 23 mm twin-barrel cannon within the lower forward fuselage. It could be outfitted with a range of armaments, including bombs, rockets, and air-to-surface missiles. The cockpit was furnished with Martin-Baker-built zero/zero ejection seats. The engine-driven starter and generators were supplied by Lucas Industries. Access to the engine for servicing and inspection was eased by the design of the rear fuselage, which was detachable.

The Orao was provisioned with standard communication and navigation equipment, the latter including a Honeywell-built SGP500 twin-gyroscope navigation system. It incorporated a fire control and weapons management system, which used the Thomson-CSF-built VE-120T head-up display (HUD). Additional avionics included GEC-Marconi's three-axis stability augmentation system and Rockwell Collins' VIR-30 (or DME-40) VHF omnidirectional range and instrument landing system. In terms of defensive sensors and systems, it was equipped with an Iskra SO-1 radar warning receiver (RWR) and provision for up to three chaff/flare dispensers, as well as a P10-65-13 passive jammer pod. Further pods could be optionally fitted, including an optical/infrared reconnaissance pod or an optical reconnaissance/jammer pod.

Various upgrade programmes for the J-22 had been proposed during the 1990s; reportedly, such efforts would have been focused upon the aircraft's avionics. However, such ambitions were heavily undermined by the dismantling of the Mostar factory during the Yugoslav Wars and the collapse of Romania's communist government. During the late 2010s, Serbia launched a major modernisation programme involving both its J-22 and NJ-22 fleets. Unofficially referred to as Orao 2.0, this work involved the installation of new navigation and targeting systems, including Safran's Sigma 95 inertial navigation system, a mission computer and multi-function displays, into the NJ-22's rear cockpit which, along with new weapons, is intended to make the type more effective in ground attack missions. A more comprehensive second phase is to achieve the "complete digitalisation" of the aircraft's cockpit.

== Operational history ==
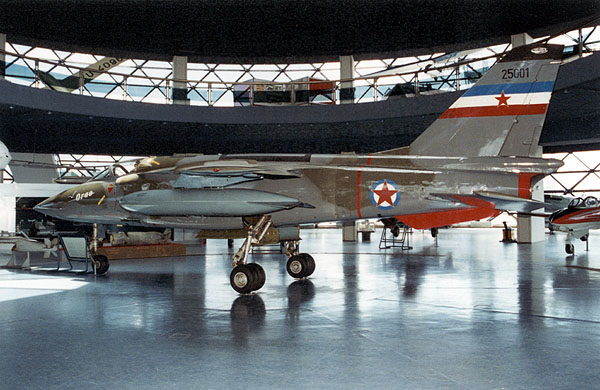
J-22 Orao single-seat prototype on display in the Museum of Aviation in Belgrade. Pre-production two-seat aircraft served as the prototype of that version.

The first Yugoslav Air Force unit to receive the J-22 was the 353rd Reconnaissance Squadron, 97th Aviation Brigade at Ortjes airbase near Mostar and 351st Reconnaissance Squadron, 82nd Aviation Brigade at Cerklje airbase. Until the 1991 war, there were only three squadrons fully equipped with J-22 attack aircraft and NJ-22 trainer-attack aircraft, these being the 238th Fighter-Bomber Squadron, 82nd Aviation Brigade; the 241st Squadron, 98th Aviation Brigade; and the 242nd Squadron, 127th Fighter-Bomber Regiment, Golubovci Airbase. There were also about three squadrons partly equipped with J-22s.

At the beginning of the Yugoslav wars, in Slovenia, J-22s flew over in a show of force, but did not drop any bombs. During 1991, the first offensive action to be conducted by the J-22 occurred when the Yugoslav People's Army (JNA) used them to strike targets in Croatia. An NJ-22 piloted by Lt. Colonel Begic Muse was hit by Strela-2M over Đakovo and crashed near Ferkusevac on 19 September 1991. He ejected and was taken prisoner.

As a result of the conflicts of the 1990s, the majority of the former Yugoslav Air Force's aircraft were relocated to the Union of Serbia and Montenegro, with smaller numbers ending up under the control of the other new states created by the break-up of Yugoslavia. The JNA left a squadron equipped with nine Oraos in the Bosnian-Serb Republika Srpska, with these aircraft becoming part of the new Republika Srpska Air Force, based at Mahovljani Airport outside Banja Luka. The airworthiness of these aircraft soon deteriorated due to the combination of limited funding and the impact of international embargoes. By June 2003, the Republika Srpska Air Force had a force of seven J-22 Oraos. These aircraft were ultimately inherited by the unified Bosnian Air Force. By 2008, all of Bosnia's J-22s had been placed into storage while the nation negotiated with neighbouring Serbia to potentially buy them; reportedly, Serbia was viewed as the only viable customer for the type. Several ex-Yugoslav Air Force J-22s were also operated by the Air Force of the Republic of Serbian Krajina following the withdrawal of the JNA from Croatia.

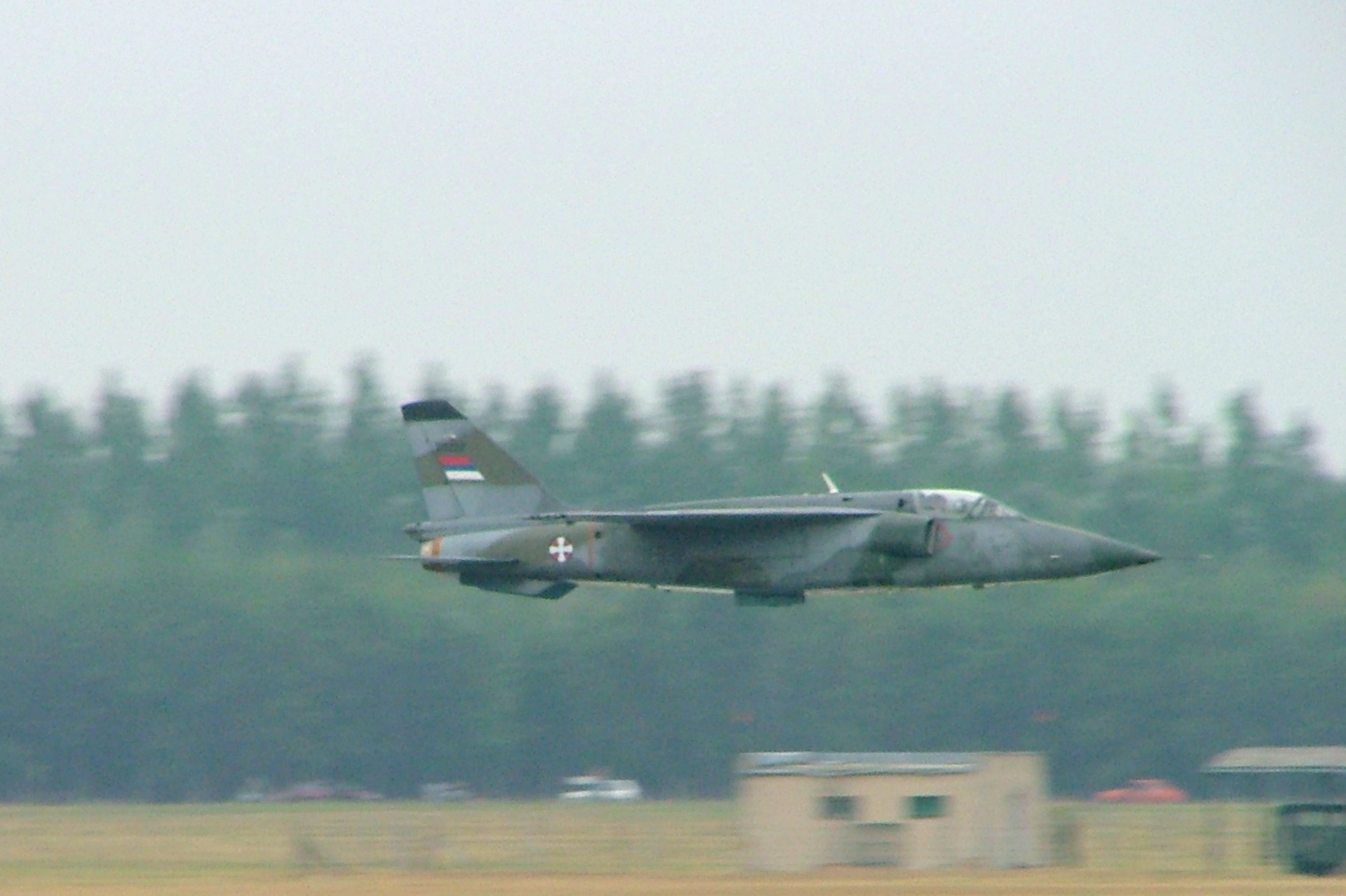
J-22 flying at low level, Kecskemét (Hungary), 2007

On 28 February 1994, two J-22 and six J-21 of the Republika Srpska Air Force sortied against Bosnian arms factories in Bugojno and Novi Travnik, respectively. The J-22s successfully attacked the target and returned unscathed to Udbina airbase, while the J-21s were intercepted by NATO F-16s after hitting their target, which culminated into the Banja Luka incident.

During 1999, Yugoslav J-22s saw limited combat against the Kosovo Liberation Army (KLA), reportedly flying 36 combat missions. One J-22, piloted by Lt. Colonel Života Ðurić, was lost on 25 March 1999 in unclear circumstances, either through malfunction, pilot error or ground fire from KLA units. In addition, eleven aircraft were destroyed on the ground, the majority of these at Ponikve Air Base, when a NATO air strike hit one hangar that reportedly had six J-22 and two Mikoyan-Gurevich MiG-21 aircraft inside.

The Serbian Air Force operates a fleet comprising seventeen J-22 and NJ-22 Oraos; of which eight are modernized (version J-22 M1A).

== Variants ==
IJ-22 Orao 1
26 dedicated reconnaissance aircraft, consisting of the single prototype, 10 pre-production, and 15 serial production aircraft. The IJ-22 Orao 1 differs from the J-22B Orao 2 in having two Viper Mk 632-41R turbojets each rated at 17.79 kN dry and supplied with fuel from an internal weight of 2,360 kg, length of 14.90 m including probe for single seat model or 15.38 m including probe for two-seat model, wheelbase of 5.40 m for single-seat model or 5.88 m for two-seat model, empty equipped weight of 5,755 kg, normal takeoff weight of 8,500 kg with reconnaissance pod, maximum take-off weight of 9500, maximum level speed 'clean' of 1,033 km/h at 8,000 m and 1,050 km/h at sea level, maximum rate of climb at sea level of 2,280 m per minute, climb to 6000 m in 3 minutes 12 seconds, and service ceiling of 13,500 m.
INJ-22 Orao 1
Two-seat variant of IJ-22 Orao 1, used for the training of reconnaissance pilots. nine were built: the single prototype, five pre-production, and three serial production aircraft.
INJ-22M Orao 1
A single serial production INJ-22 (number 25606) was converted into maritime surveillance variant at Soko factory. All equipment and controls of the rear cockpit were removed and replaced with a new display, including a large CRT monitor. An Ericsson Doppler surveillance radar, housed in a pod, was fitted under the belly.
J-22A Orao 1
Yugoslav equivalent to IAR-93A with a non-afterburning Orao/Turbomecanica (Rolls-Royce/Bristol Siddeley) Viper Mk 632-41R turbojets each rated at 17.79 kN dry, but with J-22Bs higher-rated hardpoints. First flew in October 1983 and built only as a single-seater.
J-22B Orao 2
Yugoslav equivalent to the IAR-93B with afterburner, integral wing tankage, the greater weapons load and diversity of the J-22A Orao 1, and Thomson-CSF HUD. Built only in single-seat form. J-22A/B production totalled 165 aircraft. Yugoslavia had planned a major upgrade with radar and computer nav/attack system integrated via a MIL-STD-1553 digital databus, but the dissolution of Yugoslavia ended plans. Only 57 aircraft were delivered before production ceased; not all were up to the full J-22 Orao 2 standard. An additional 42 aircraft were ordered but never delivered.
NJ-22 Orao
Dedicated two-seat training variant with afterburning engines operated by Yugoslav Air Force. First flew July 1986, and 21 were delivered whilst construction of a further 17 was cancelled.
J-22M1A Orao
Modernized J-22 with glass cockpit, sensors, and external cameras.

== Operators ==
Serbia

- Serbian Air Force and Air Defence – 17 in service of which 4 are modernized (version J-22 M1A).

=== Former operators ===
Bosnia and Herzegovina

- Air Force and Anti-Aircraft Defence of Bosnia and Herzegovina – inherited 7 aircraft from the Republika Srpska Air Force. None are in service as of 2019.

Yugoslavia

- Yugoslav Air Force – aircraft passed to successor states after the breakup of Yugoslavia.

== Specifications (J-22) ==
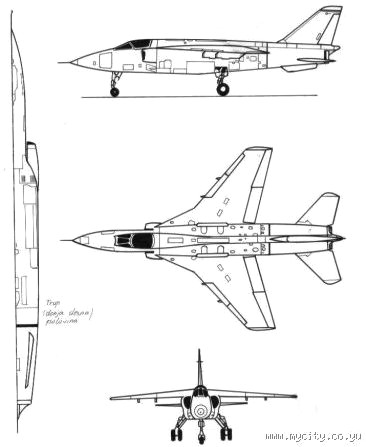
Three point view

Data from Jane's All The World's Aircraft 1993-94, International Air Power Review Vol.3

General characteristics

- Crew: 1
- Length: 13.02 m (42 ft 9 in) (fuselage length); 14.90 m (48 ft 11 in) (including nose probe)
- Wingspan: 9.30 m (30 ft 6 in)
- Height: 4.52 m (14 ft 10 in)
- Wing area: 26.00 m^{2} (279.9 sq ft)
- Aspect ratio: 3.33:1
- Airfoil: NACA 65A-008 (modified)
- Empty weight: 5,500 kg (12,125 lb)
- Gross weight: 8,170 kg (18,012 lb) (clean)
- Max takeoff weight: 11,080 kg (24,427 lb)
- Fuel capacity: 3,120 L (820 US gal; 690 imp gal)
- Powerplant: 2 × Orao/Turbomecanica-built Rolls-Royce Viper Mk 633-47 turbojets, 17.79 kN (4,000 lbf) thrust each dry, 22.24 kN (5,000 lbf) with afterburner

Performance

- Maximum speed: 1,130 km/h (700 mph, 610 kn) at sea level; Mach 0.96 at 11,000 m (36,000 ft)
- Stall speed: 185 km/h (115 mph, 100 kn) (gear and flaps down)
- Combat range: 522 km (324 mi, 282 nmi) (hi-lo-hi profile with 4× BL755 cluster bombs and 1× 1,500 L (400 US gal; 330 imp gal) drop tank)
- Ferry range: 1,320 km (820 mi, 710 nmi) (2× 500 L (130 US gal; 110 imp gal) drop tanks)
- Service ceiling: 15,000 m (49,000 ft)
- g limits: -4.2 - +8
- Rate of climb: 89.0 m/s (17,520 ft/min)
- Thrust/weight: 0.44 at gross weight

Armament

- Guns: 2× GSh-23L cannons in lower front fuselage, below engine air intakes, with 200 rounds per gun
- Hardpoints: 5 (4 underwing and 1 centreline) with a capacity of 500 kg (1,100 lb) wing hardpoints, 800 kg (1,800 lb) fuselage station, 2,800 kg (6,200 lb) total, with provisions to carry combinations of:
  - Rockets: BRZ-127 rockets, L-57-16MD (UB-16) rocket pods, L-128-04 rocket pods
  - Missiles: AGM-65B Maverick TV guided AGM or Grom-1 AGM (based on Soviet Kh-23), VRVZ-200 infrared homing AGM (Only fitted to modernised variants of the J-22, there are TV guided variants of the missile), VRVZ-240 infrared homing AGM (Only fitted to modernised variants of the J-22) R-60MK infrared homing AAM
  - Bombs: 50/100/250/500 kg general-purpose bombs, BL755 cluster bombs, PLAB-350 napalm bombs, LVB-250F Laser-guided bomb (based off the FAB-250 bomb, that has been modified with a guidance system, only fitted to modernised variants of the J-22)
  - Other: Matra Durandal anti-runway bombs, AM-500 sea mines, RADEOM Radar jamming pod

Avionics
Thomson-CSF Heads Up Display

== See also ==
Related development

- IAR-93 Vultur

Aircraft of comparable role, configuration, and era

- Sukhoi Su-25
- AMX International AMX
- Mitsubishi F-1
- Nanchang Q-5
- SEPECAT Jaguar
