= Republika Srpska Air Force =

Former air force of an entity within Bosnia and Herzegovina

Air Force and Air Defense of the Republika Srpska Army
- Ратно ваздухопловство и противваздушна одбрана Војске Републике Српске
- V i PVO RS patch
- Active: 1992–2006
- Country: Bosnia and Herzegovina (after 1995)
- Allegiance: Republika Srpska
- Type: Air force
- Role: Aerial warfare
- Part of: Army of Republika Srpska
- Garrison/HQ: Banja Luka

Insignia
- Roundel

- Roundel (version No. 2)

- Roundel (version No. 3)

Aircraft flown
- Attack: J-22, G-4, J-21, SA.342 GAMA
- Reconnaissance: IJ-21, SA.341 HERA
- Trainer: UTVA 75, G-4, NJ-21
- Transport: Mi-8

The Republika Srpska Air Force (Serbian: Ратно ваздухопловство и противваздушна одбрана Војске Републике Српске, romanized: Ratno vazduhoplovstvo i protivvazdušna odbrana Vojske Republike Srpske, lit. 'Air Force and Air Defense of the Republika Srpska Army') was the air force of Republika Srpska.

== History ==
In May 1992, the Army of Republika Srpska (VRS), with the support of the Federal Yugoslav Air Force, quickly established its own air force at Banja Luka. The Republika Srpska Air Force provided support to VRS units fighting against Bosniak and Croat forces during Operation Corridor 92, linking Yugoslavia with the Bosnian Serb-held areas around Banja Luka.

Even after the United Nations imposed a no-fly zone in Bosnia in 1992, the Republika Srpska Air Force continued conducting combat sorties, while ground crews kept combat aircraft airworthy in late 1992. While all warring factions in the Bosnian War, including the VRS, avoided employing fighter aircraft between 1993 and 1994, they made extensive use of helicopters for resupply missions.

== Structure ==
=== 1992–1995 ===
According to Tim Ripley, the order of battle in 1995 was:

- Banja Luka International Airport
  - 92nd Air Brigade
  - 238th Fighter Squadron
    - 5× Soko G-4 Super Galeb
    - 10× Soko J-21 Jastreb
    - 9× Soko J-22 Orao
    - ?× Soko G-2 Galeb
  - 92nd Multi-role Squadron
    - UTVA 75, UTVA 66, Piper PA-18 Super Cub
- Zalužani
  - 11th Helicopter Regiment
    - 16× Soko Gazelle (SA-341H/342L variants)
    - 18× Mil Mi-8

=== Post-1995 ===
According to Jane's, the Republika Srpska Air Force had a total of 14,000 personnel in 2003, while its aircraft inventory was limited by international peace treaties to 21 fixed-wing combat aircraft. Jane's also estimated that 30 helicopters and several light aircraft were in service in 2003.

== Inventory ==
In 2004, the International Institute for Strategic Studies estimated that the Republika Srpska Air Force had 19 fixed-wing combat aircraft, 33 helicopters, and 2 UTVA 75 trainers.

Aircraft	Origin	Role	Number	Notes
Combat
Soko J-22 Orao	Yugoslavia	Attack	7	
Soko J-21 Jastreb	Yugoslavia	Attack	11	2 IJ-21s were used for reconnaissance and 3 NJ-21s were also used for training.
Soko G-4 Super Galeb	Yugoslavia	Attack	1	Also used for training.
Helicopter
Soko Gazelle	France / Yugoslavia	Attack	22	SA-342 built under license. HO-42, HO-45, and HN-45M variants used.
Mil Mi-8	Soviet Union	Utility	11	
Trainer
UTVA 75	Yugoslavia	Utility	2	

== Gallery ==
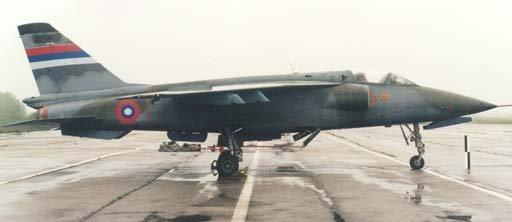
J-22 Orao

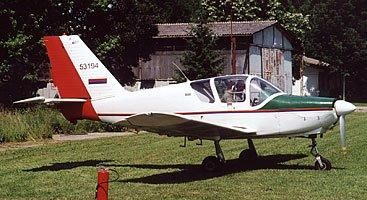
UTVA 75
