= Tuzla International Airport =

Tuzla International Airport Međunarodni aerodrom Tuzla

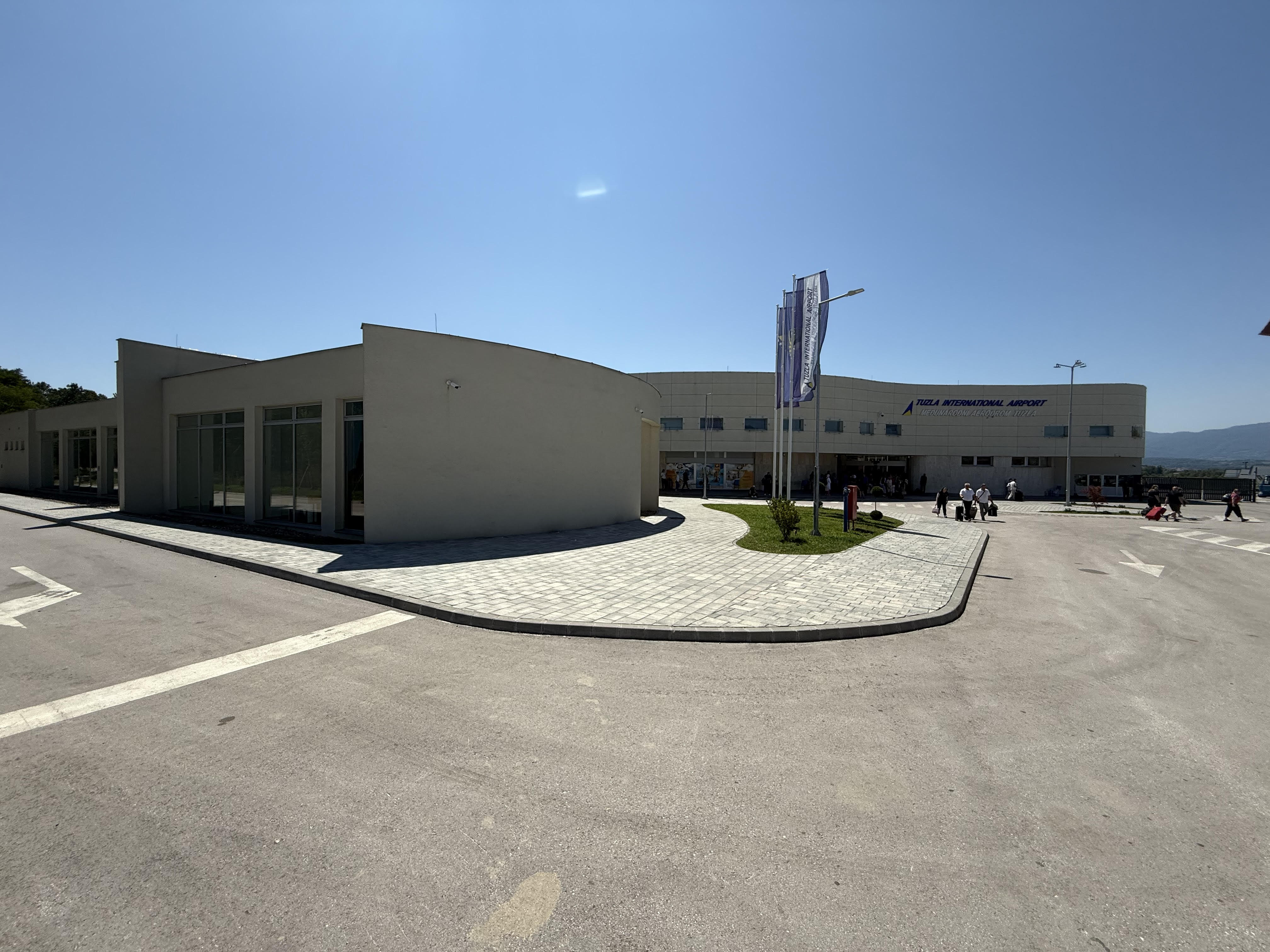
- IATA: TZL; ICAO: LQTZ

Summary
- Airport type: Civil/Military
- Owner: Tuzla Canton government
- Operator: Bosnia and Herzegovina Directorate of Civil Aviation
- Serves: Tuzla Canton, Bosnia and Herzegovina
- Location: Dubrave Gornje, Bosnia and Herzegovina
- Elevation AMSL: 765 ft (233 m)
- Coordinates: 44°27′31″N 18°43′29″E
- Website: tuzla-airport.ba

Map
- Location of the airport in Bosnia and Herzegovina

Runways
Direction	Length		Surface
Direction	ft	m	Surface
09/27	8,152	2,500	Asphalt

Statistics (2025)
- Passengers: 338.132 ▲75,3%
- Aircraft Movements: 2.149 ▲36,7%
- Freight (in tons): 0 ▲0,00%
- Source: Bosnia and Herzegovina Directorate of Civil Aviation

Tuzla International Airport (Bosnian: Međunarodni aerodrom Tuzla) (Croatian: Međunarodna zračna luka Tuzla) (Serbian: Међународни аеродром Тузла); (IATA: TZL, ICAO: LQTZ) is an airport in Živinice near Tuzla, Bosnia and Herzegovina. It is the second largest airport in Bosnia and Herzegovina, after Sarajevo International Airport. The airport is known as a low-cost airline hub of Bosnia and Herzegovina since it is used by people from Bosnia, the diaspora and travellers from neighbouring countries Croatia and Serbia. It is a civilian airport and was also a military airbase.

== History ==
=== Early years ===
Tuzla International was once the largest military airport in the former Yugoslavia. The 350th Reconnaissance Aviation Squadron was active there for a time.

In the early 1990s, still within Yugoslavia and prior start of the Bosnian War, Yugoslav airliner Air Commerce performed commercial flights from Sarajevo and Tuzla to Austria and Switzerland.

It was placed under the control of the United Nations Protection Force in 1992, and from 1996 onwards, it became the main hub for the Implementation Force (IFOR), which was charged with supervising the implementation of the Dayton Agreement. In 1998, Tuzla Canton turned Tuzla International into a civil airport. Tuzla International opened on 10 October 1998 as a civilian airport and military airfield. After the complete international military withdrawal on 1 December 2006, Tuzla International Airport began the implementation of all technical requirements and standards imposed by the International Civil Aviation Organization.

=== Development since the 2000s ===
Finally, on 5 June 2008, Tuzla International Airport obtained a provisional Certificate for Public Airport Use in international air transportation valid for one year. After general audit implemented by authorized institutions of Civil Aviation in BiH, on 5 June 2009, Tuzla International Airport obtained a Certificate for Public Airport Use in international air transportation with unlimited period of validity.

In June 2015, Hungarian low-cost carrier Wizz Air opened an operating base in Tuzla, by basing one Airbus A320 at the airport. After base opening, total Wizz Air destinations from Tuzla jumped to 9, including 22 weekly departures in the summer flight schedule. 2 June 2016, Turkish Airlines Cargo began operating flights from Tuzla to Istanbul–Atatürk. The Turkish government allocated a quota of 15,000 tons of fresh meat and meat products to import from Bosnia and Herzegovina. Total of 90 flights with Airbus A330 freighter aircraft were planned for 2016. This was the only wide-body aircraft flight operating to and from Bosnia and Herzegovina at the time. On 31 August 2016, Wizz Air announced that it would base its second aircraft at Tuzla Airport as of 27 March 2017. From March 2017, the airline started operating five new services from Tuzla to Cologne/Bonn, Friedrichshafen, and Nuremberg in Germany, Bratislava in Slovakia and Växjö in Sweden. Wizz Air also announced its newest route connecting Tuzla with London–Luton in the United Kingdom beginning 30 October, Billund in Denmark beginning 31 October, and Berlin–Schönefeld beginning 17 December. Total number of weekly flights increased to 43 round trip flights, serving 16 destinations in 7 countries. On 2 November 2016, Tuzla International Airport announced the start of terminal expansion and reconstruction. Capacity of the new building was projected to host 700.000 passengers per year. The reconstruction was finished in May 2019. In November 2017, Wizz Air stopped flying to London-Luton, Nuremberg and Bratislava. 2017 was the record year for Tuzla Airport since it opened its doors, passing half a million passengers for the first time ever. In June 2018, Wizz Air started operating flights from Tuzla to Karlsruhe/Baden-Baden in Germany. In May 2021, Ryanair planned to launch two routes from Tuzla to Weeze and Karlsruhe/Baden-Baden with potential future routes to Stockholm, London-Stansted, Malta and Memmingen. However, the government did not approve the flights. On 12 August 2021, Wizz Air announced that it would base its third base aircraft in Tuzla and open two new routes to Milan-Malpensa and Nuremberg in December 2021. In 2023, Wizz Air announced that it would close its base and lower its operation in Tuzla.

In 18 December 2023, the Greek carrier Lumiwings launched a base in Tuzla, with flights to Esbjerg, Halmstad, Maastricht, Saarbrucken and Stockholm Skavsta. Istanbul was also scheduled to be launched on 5 March, but Lumiwings later cancelled the launch and discontinued Stockholm Skavsta flights amidst poor loads before fully discontinuing the base on 27 February.

On 11 July 2024, Turkish low cost carrier Pegasus Airlines announced a new once-weekly scheduled service from Istanbul Sabiha Gokcen Airport from 24 August 2024.

On 12 December 2025, Wizz Air reopened base at Tuzla International Airport, with two Airbus A321neo aircraft stationed at the airport. The airline started flights from Tuzla to Cyprus, Germany, France, Netherlands and Sweden.

== Facilities ==
=== Terminal ===
The passengers' terminal building opened in 1998, provides a capacity of 350 passengers per peak hour. The terminal is equipped with one gate for arrival and departure, two check-in counters for registration of passengers, services for handicapped passengers, ticketing service as well as further passenger amenities and a border guard (SBS) control (24 hours) equipped with x-ray machines and customs control. The Government of The Federation of Bosnia and Herzegovina has decided to allocate 2 million KM (approximately 1 million €) in the year 2016 for initial plans and works for a new terminal building, while the Government of Tuzla Canton secured 500.000 KM for installation of new and improved approach lighting system. Many car rental agencies have offices at the airport and the airport also provides long term parking for road vehicles.

=== Aprons ===
Tuzla Airport has three aprons, currently two in use: passenger aircraft apron with size 116 x 106 meters and cargo apron with approximately same size. Aprons are designed to service all classes of aircraft. Two medium size aircraft Boeing 737 or Airbus A320 family aircraft can be handled at the same time at passengers apron next to the terminal building. On cargo apron two Ilyushin Il-76 or Airbus A330 freighter can be handled at the same time in two parking positions, or an Antonov An-124 or Boeing 747 cargo in one parking position. Tuzla International Airport had a signed agreement with Turkish Airlines to service 130 cargo flights in 2016 from Istanbul with the Airbus A330F. The airport has mixed civil and military use and the airport is home to the 3rd Helicopter Squadron of the Air Force of Bosnia and Herzegovina. Next to taxiway F, parallel to the runway, there are 31 parking positions for helicopters Bell UH-1 and others of similar size.

Airport operating hours are from 03:30 to 24:00 LT for commercial air carriers and 06:00 to 17:00 LT for general/corporate aviation with a possible extension. Tuzla International Airport is ICAO-classified as ILS CAT I.

== Airlines and destinations ==
The following airlines operate regular flights to and from Tuzla:

Airlines	Destinations
Air Cairo	Seasonal charter: Hurghada
Chair Airlines	Seasonal: Zurich
Corendon Airlines	Seasonal charter: Antalya
Freebird Airlines	Seasonal charter: Antalya
Nile Air	Seasonal charter: Hurghada
Pegasus Airlines	Seasonal: Istanbul–Sabiha Gökçen
Wizz Air	Basel/Mulhouse, Berlin (ends 8 January 2027), Bratislava (ends 9 January 2027), Cologne/Bonn (ends 10 January 2027), Dortmund, Hahn, Hamburg, Karlsruhe/Baden-Baden (resumes 24 March 2027), Maastricht/Aachen (ends 8 January 2027), Malmö, Memmingen; Seasonal: Larnaca

== Statistics ==
=== Passenger development ===
Year/Month	January	February	March	April	May	June	July	August	September	October	November	December	Year total	Change
2026	34,989	27,331	35,615	64,296	62,035	65,610	71,701	74,022	58,428	60,911			554.938	
2025	20,742	17,842	22,724	21,827	21,866	31,646	38,214	42,087	34,390	32,977	21,934	31,888	338,132	▲75.3%
2024	19,171	17,162	14,737	13,158	13,023	13,691	18,317	22,538	20,436	19,192	16,700	19,426	207,551	▼71.3%
2023	58,304	48,326	53,076	67,152	68,442	64,795	72,079	70,088	28,118	18,825	15,341	17,899	582,445	▲22.8%
2022	23,368	14,630	22,194	40,361	41,322	40,207	50,027	51,426	42,688	44,713	50,651	52,151	474,336	▲58.6%
2021	12,394	8,427	11,650	13,969	19,880	23,006	45,983	48,630	32,970	35,027	21,600	25,473	298,999	▲26.6%
2020	35,188	36,588	17,665	0	100	19,456	32,008	28,813	19,509	17,120	9,505	12,473	228,425	▼61.4%
2019	36,341	30,658	35,679	56,276	52,425	59,581	67,794	66,732	56,412	54,018	35,484	41,617	593,083	▲1.5%
2018	40,563	35,976	43,112	52,638	49,371	53,709	67,438	65,364	56,062	50,122	30,763	39,471	584,589	▲9.0%
2017	26,554	23,105	29,116	50,763	47,701	49,662	63,173	63,788	52,816	51,556	37,432	40,178	535,834	▲72.1%
2016	19,234	19,939	23,598	25,261	27,324	26,673	32,229	31,046	27,793	27,621	23,619	27,061	311,398	▲20.2%
2015	12,960	12,005	14,474	17,311	18,082	21,563	33,666	33.007	28,900	27,167	22,462	17,427	259,074	▲71.2%
2014	8,276	6,455	7,289	9,495	9,343	12,195	19,887	19,253	16,.967	16,299	12,363	13,531	151,353	▲146.0%
2013	1	0	0	0	455	6,251	11,868	11,000	9,071	8,673	7,359	6,835	61,513	▲1367.7%
2012	8	0	51	13	2	854	1,762	1,243	195	59	4	0	4,191	▼7.4%
2011	0	0	12	54	8	1,143	1,506	965	10	426	403	0	4,527	N/A

=== Passenger route statistics ===
Tuzla Airport passenger numbers by destination (2019)
Rank	Airport	Passengers handled	% change 2018/2019
1	Basel/Mulhouse/Freiburg	66,762	▲4.21
2	Dortmund	65,606	▲8.22
3	Malmö	55,489	▼5.26
4	Gothenburg	52,095	▲2,64
5	Berlin–Schönefeld	-	▲
6	Hahn	41,872	▲5.17
7	Memmingen	40,605	▲4.57
8	Cologne/Bonn	-	▲
9	Friedrichshafen	33,134	▼0,10
10	Stockholm–Skavsta	-	▼

Tuzla Airport passenger numbers by destination (2018)
Rank	Airport	Passengers handled	% change 2017/2018
1	Basel/Mulhouse/Freiburg	64,060	▲29.40
2	Dortmund	60,621	▲21.77
3	Malmö	58,570	▲3.73
4	Gothenburg	50,751	▼0.35
5	Berlin–Schönefeld	41,184	▲30.16
6	Hahn	39,812	▲4.60
7	Memmingen	38,830	▲17.60
8	Cologne/Bonn	36,930	▲20.69
9	Friedrichshafen	33,168	▲25.13
10	Stockholm–Skavsta	25,322	▼0.73

Tuzla Airport passenger numbers by destination (2017)
Rank	Airport	Passengers handled	% change 2016/2017
1	Malmö	56,461	▲26.72
2	Gothenburg	50,930	▲18.46
3	Dortmund	49,781	▲0.93
4	Basel/Mulhouse/Freiburg	49,503	▲28.95
5	Hahn	38,058	▲22.76
6	Memmingen	33,016	▲4.30
7	Friedrichshafen	26,506	▲0,0
8	Stockholm–Skavsta	25,510	▲13.16
9	London–Luton	20,708	▲0.0
10	Växjö	20,269	▲0.0

=== Freight statistics ===
Year	Loaded (in t)	Unloaded (in t)	Total cargo(in t)
2017	249.6	-	▲249.6
2016	6,065,92	3.83	▲6,062,09
2015	219,557	16,689	▲236,246
2014	55,559	53,793	109,392

== Ground transport ==
Tuzla Airport is situated at a secondary road that leads to Kalesija to the east and to Živinice to the west. The main road to Sarajevo, Tuzla, and other cities across the country connects from there.

== See also ==
- List of airports in Bosnia and Herzegovina
