= Foggia Gino Lisa Airport =

Foggia Gino Lisa Airport Aeroporto di Foggia Gino Lisa

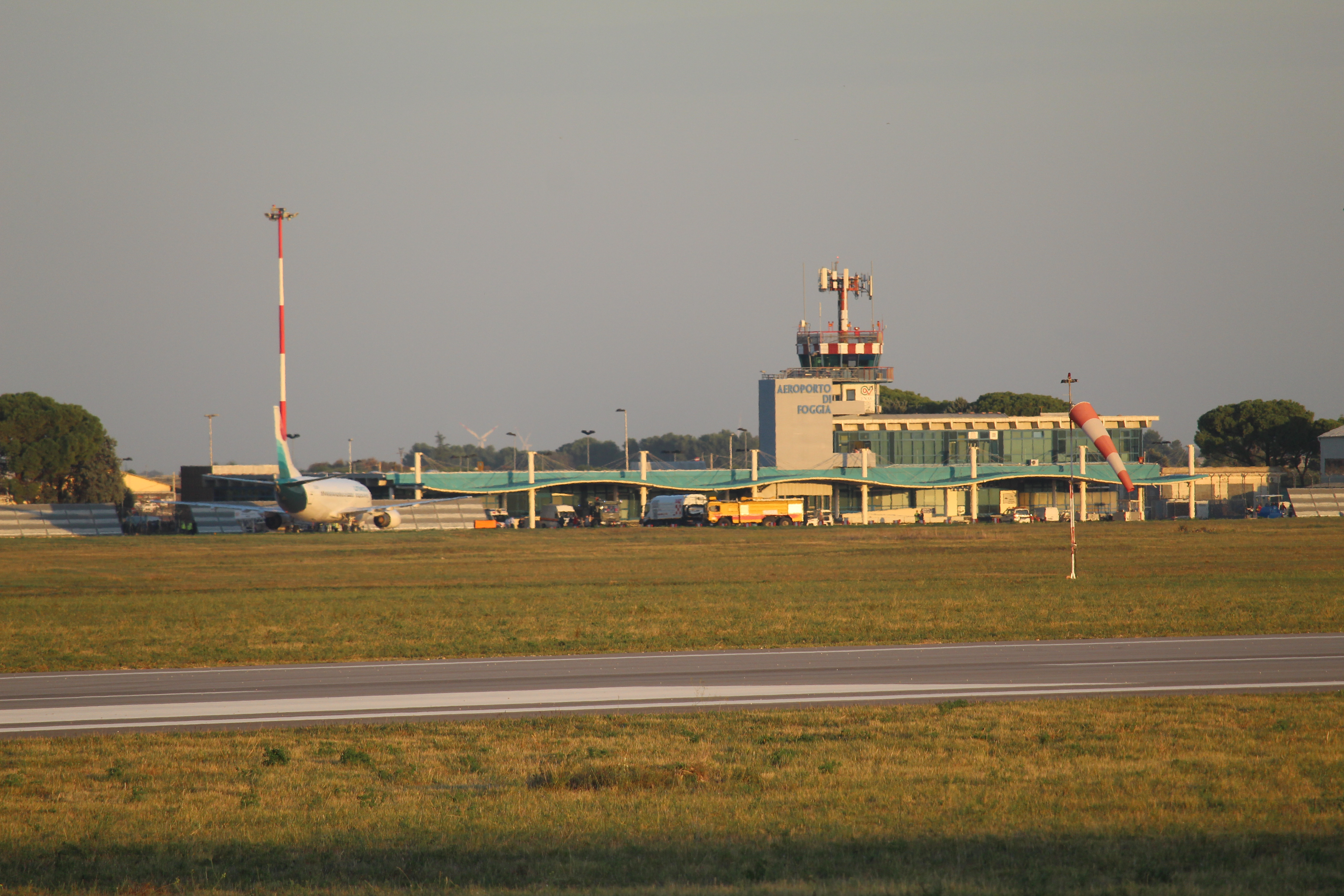
- IATA: FOG; ICAO: LIBF

Summary
- Airport type: Public
- Operator: Aeroporti di Puglia - S.p.A.
- Serves: Foggia, Italy
- Focus city for: Aeroitalia; Alidaunia
- Elevation AMSL: 266 ft (81 m)
- Coordinates: 41°25′58″N 015°32′06″E
- Website: aeroportidipuglia.it

Map
- Location of airport in Italy FOG (Italy)

Runways
Direction	Length		Surface
Direction	m	ft	Surface
16/34	1,795	5,890	Asphalt

Statistics (2024)
- Passengers: 62,149
- Passenger change 23-24: ▲28.1%
- Aircraft movements: 2328
- Movements change 23-24: ▲22.5%
- Source: DAFIF; Statistics from Assaeroporti

Foggia Gino Lisa Airport (Italian: Aeroporto di Foggia Gino Lisa) (IATA: FOG, ICAO: LIBF) is an airport serving Foggia, Italy. Its name commemorates the Italian aviator Gino Lisa (1896-1917).

== Facilities ==
The airport is at an elevation of 266 feet (81 m) above mean sea level. It has one runway, designated 16/34 with an asphalt surface, measuring 1,440 by 45 metres (4,724 ft × 148 ft).

== Helicopter service ==
Foggia airport serves as a hub for the Italian airline Alidaunia, which has a terminal for its flights to the Tremiti Islands. Alidaunia also provides a flying school, a maintenance hangar, and the rescue service in Apulia.

== Airlines and destinations ==
The following airlines operate regular scheduled and charter flights at Foggia Airport:

Airlines	Destinations
Aeroitalia	Bergamo, Milan-Linate, Turin
Alidaunia	Peschici, Tremiti Islands, Vieste
