= Ortiješ =

- Village
- Location within Bosnia and Herzegovina
- Coordinates: 43.2707527°N 17.8361105°E
- Country: Bosnia and Herzegovina
- Entity: Federation of Bosnia and Herzegovina
- Canton: Herzegovina-Neretva
- Municipality: City of Mostar

Area
  - Total: 0.37 sq mi (0.95 km^{2})

Population (2013)
  - Total: 487
  - Density: 1,300/sq mi (510/km^{2})
- Time zone: UTC+1 (CET)
  - Summer (DST): UTC+2 (CEST)
- Postal code: 88000 (Same as Mostar)
- Area code: (+387) 36 345

Ortiješ is a village in the City of Mostar, Bosnia and Herzegovina.

== Demographics ==
According to the 2013 census, its population was 487.

Ethnicity in 2013
Ethnicity	Number	Percentage
Croats	364	74.7%
Serbs	105	21.6%
Bosniaks	15	3.1%
other/undeclared	3	0.6%
Total	487	100%
