= List of NATO operations =

Although the North Atlantic Treaty Organization (NATO) existed as an alliance and conducted joint military exercises throughout the Cold War period, it engaged in no military operations during this time. All of its military operations occurred in the post-Cold War era. The first of these was in Bosnia, where NATO engaged to an increasing extent. This engagement culminated in NATO's 1995 air campaign, Operation Deliberate Force, which targeted the Army of Republika Srpska, whose presence in Bosnia posed a danger to United Nations Safe Areas. This engagement ultimately helped to bring about the Dayton Accords.

The organization played a prominent role in Afghanistan after the September 11 attacks, when the United States invoked Article 5 of the North Atlantic Treaty, which interprets an external attack on any member to be an attack on all NATO members under the idea of collective defense. NATO has participated in a wide range of roles elsewhere, including relief efforts, counter-piracy, enforcing no-fly zones and naval blockades.

== Breakup of Yugoslavia ==
=== Bosnia and Herzegovina (1992–2004) ===
NATO was prominent in Bosnia during the early 1990s, and gradually its role became larger with some operations escalating, for instance Operation Sky Monitor turned into Operation Deny Flight which gave NATO "all measures necessary" to enforce a more stringent no-fly zone unlike Sky Monitor during which the no-fly zone was violated over 500 times. It took 46 years after NATO's inception in 1949 for the organization first ever military intervention took place in 1995, Operation Deliberate Force which was targeted the Army of Republika Srpska in Bosnia whose presence posed a danger to designated United Nations "safe areas". The air campaign helped bring about the Dayton Accords.

| Date | Operation | Location | Type | Information |
|---|---|---|---|---|
| 16 July 1992 – 22 November 1992 | Operation Maritime Monitor | International waters off former Yugoslavia | Naval blockade | Naval blockade aimed at enforcing sanctions stipulated in UN Security Council Resolutions 713 and 757. |
| 16 October 1992 – 12 April 1993 | Operation Sky Monitor (Resolution 781) | Bosnian airspace | No-fly zone | Established a no-fly zone over the airspace of Bosnia and Herzegovina. Effectiveness of the no-fly zone is debatable as by April 1993 500 violations (by all sides) of the no-fly zone had been recorded. NATO members voted for an "all necessary measures" resolution by the United Nations to allow NATO a mandate to enforce the no-fly zone more stringently. |
| 22 November 1992 – 15 June 1993 | Operation Maritime Guard (Resolution 787) | International waters in Adriatic Sea | Naval blockade | Authorized NATO to use force, and included stopping, inspecting, and diverting ships bound for the former Yugoslavia. All ships bound to or coming from the territorial waters of the former Yugoslavia were halted for inspection and verification of their cargoes and destinations. |
| 13 April 1993 – 20 December 1995 | Operation Deny Flight (Resolutions 816 and 836) | Bosnian airspace | No-fly zone | Resolution 816 extended the ban to cover flights by all fixed-wing and rotary-wing aircraft over the country, and to use all measures necessary to ensure compliance with the ban. Resolution 836 authorized the use of force by UNPROFOR in the protection of specially designated UN "safe areas". |
| 15 June 1993 – 2 October 1996 | Operation Sharp Guard (Numerous resolutions) | Yugoslavia | Naval blockade | A widespread naval blockade aimed at all former Yugoslavia. |
| 30 August – 20 September 1995 | Operation Deliberate Force | Bosnia and Herzegovina | Air campaign | Involving approximately 400 aircraft, Deliberate Force targeted at the Army of Republika Srpska whose presence in Bosnia posed a danger to United Nations "safe areas". |
| 20 December 1995 – 20 December 1996 | Operation Joint Endeavour | Bosnia and Herzegovina | Peacekeeping force | NATO-led Implementation Force (IFOR) peacekeeping force was established which was a force tasked with enforcing the peace under the Dayton Accords. |
| 21 December 1996 – 19 June 1998 | Operation Joint Guard | Bosnia and Herzegovina | Peacekeeping force | NATO-led Stabilisation Force (SFOR) peacekeeping force which replaced the IFOR which was a force tasked with enforcing peace under the Dayton Accords. |
| 20 June 1998 – 2 December 2004 | Operation Joint Forge | Bosnia and Herzegovina | Peacekeeping force | A continuation of Operation Joint Guard. |

=== Serbia, Kosovo and North Macedonia (1999–present) ===
| Date | Operation | Location | Type | Information |
|---|---|---|---|---|
| 24 March 1999 – 10 June 1999 | Operation Allied Force | FR Yugoslavia | Air campaign | A sustained air campaign targeting infrastructure in Serbia and Serbian forces in Kosovo with the aim of getting the 'Serbs out [of Kosovo], peacekeepers in, refugees back' in the eyes of one NATO spokesman. The bombing lasted for nearly 3 months before all sides accepted the Kumanovo Treaty which ended the Kosovo War and the deployment of KFOR. The legitimacy of the NATO air campaign has been questioned, as too was the number of civilian casualties in the operation. |
| 12 June 1999 – present | KFOR | UN-administered Kosovo → Kosovo | Peacekeeping force | A NATO-led Kosovo Force (KFOR) international peacekeeping force responsible for establishing a secure environment in Kosovo to enforce Resolution 1244. |
| 27 August 2001 – 26 September 2001 | Operation Essential Harvest | North Macedonia | Security mission | Its aim was to disarm the National Liberation Army fighters. Their weapons were handed over to the NATO forces in Macedonia. 3500 soldiers were involved. |

== Global War on Terror (2001–present) ==
| Date | Operation | Location | Type | Information |
|---|---|---|---|---|
| 9 October 2001 – 16 May 2002 | Operation Eagle Assist | United States airspace | Aerial counter-terrorism | The 11 September attacks in the United States, a NATO member, invoked Article 5 of the North Atlantic Treaty. It remains the only time since NATO's inception that an attack from an external party or state has been deemed an attack on all NATO members. Operation Eagle Assist, which involved aerial patrols over the United States to prevent further attacks, was the first of two NATO operations undertaken in defense of the United States under Article 5. |
| 16 October 2001 – 9 November 2016 | Operation Active Endeavor | Mediterranean Sea (confined to eastern Mediterranean prior to March 2004, entire sea thereafter) | Maritime counter-terrorism and anti-trafficking | The 11 September attacks in the United States, a NATO member, invoked Article 5 of the North Atlantic Treaty. It remains the only time since NATO's inception that an attack from an external party or state has been deemed an attack on all NATO members. Operation Active Endeavor, which involved maritime patrols to monitor shipping in the Mediterranean Sea "to detect and deter terrorism", was the second of two NATO operations undertaken in defense of the United States under Article 5. |
| 20 December 2001 – 28 December 2014 | International Security Assistance Force | Afghanistan | Security mission | On 20 December 2001, UN Security Council Resolution 1386 unanimously approved the International Security Assistance Force (ISAF), a multi-national coalition with the aim of enforcing peace in Afghanistan. ISAF was led by NATO from August 2003 to December 2014. ISAF ceased combat operations in 2014, with a minority of troops remaining behind as the advisory Resolute Support Mission. |
| 26 February 2003 – 3 May 2003 | Operation Display Deterrence | Turkey | Border defense | Deterrence to Iraq aggression against Turkey during the Iraq War. |
| 1 January 2015 – 12 July 2021 | Resolute Support Mission | Afghanistan | Training, advisory, and assistance mission | The objective of the mission was to provide training, advice and assistance for the Afghan security forces and institutions. The Resolute Support Mission envisaged the deployment of approximately 12,000 personnel from NATO and partner nations in Afghanistan with the central hub at Kabul and Bagram Airfield supporting four spokes. |
| 31 October 2018 – 20 March 2026 | NATO Mission Iraq | Iraq | Training, advisory, and assistance mission | NATO Mission Iraq (NMI) was a non-combat advisory and capacity-building mission that assisted Iraq in building more sustainable, transparent, inclusive and effective armed forces and security institutions, so that Iraqis themselves were better able to stabilise their country, fight terrorism and prevent the return of ISIS/Daesh. All advisory forces were withdrawn in March of 2026 following escalations in the Iran War. |

== Russo-Ukrainian war (2022–present) ==
| Date | Operation | Location | Type | Information |
|---|---|---|---|---|
| 14 January 2025 – present | Operation Baltic Sentry | Baltic Sea Lithuania Latvia Estonia | Security mission | The operation follows the 2024 Estlink 2 incident and other 2024 Baltic Sea submarine cable disruptions, aiming to protect seabed infrastructure and the planned decoupling of Lithuania, Latvia and Estonia from the Russia energy grid as they switch to the European grid via Poland, on 8 February 2025. |
| 12 September 2025 – present | Operation Eastern Sentry | Bulgaria; Czech Republic; Estonia; Hungary; Latvia; Lithuania; Poland; Romania; Slovakia | Deterrence and defense | The primary purpose of the operation is to increase NATO's capacity—in the air, at sea, and on the ground—to counter military threats posed by Russia, in particular to intercept Russian drones violating the airspace of NATO's eastern flank. |

== Other operations ==
| Date | Operation | Location | Type | Information |
|---|---|---|---|---|
| 8 October 2005 – 9 February 2006 | Pakistan earthquake relief | Pakistan | Relief effort – Airlift | NATO took on another new responsibility in the post-Cold War era by providing aid in the wake of 2005 Kashmir earthquake in Pakistan. NATO accepted a request from the Pakistani government for assistance and in total 3,500 tons of relief supplies were delivered to Pakistan whilst also sending medical teams and engineers. |
| 17 August 2009 – 15 December 2016 | Operation Ocean Shield (Resolution 1838 and 1950) | Red Sea, Gulf of Aden, Indian Ocean Somalia and Yemen | Counter-piracy (Piracy in Somalia) | In October 2008, NATO announced they would send NATO warships to counter the rising problem of piracy off the coast of Africa. In August 2009, the mission was upgraded to Operation Ocean Shield which was a concerted effort to eradicate piracy. With no successful piracy attacks since 2012, the operation ended in 2016. |
| 27 March 2011 – 31 October 2011 | Operation Unified Protector (Resolution 1973) | Libya | No-fly zone; Air campaign | By March 2011, the Arab Spring had spread to Libya, with protests against the regime of Muammar Gaddafi. Amid reports that Libyan Air Force pilots had been ordered to bomb protesters, two pilots refused to carry out this order and defected, landing their fighter jets in Malta. UN SC Resolution 1973 gave NATO a mandate to enforce a no-fly zone using "all necessary measures" to protect civilians. |
| 4 December 2012 – present | Operation Active Fence | Turkey | Anti-missile defense | Turkey asked for NATO support to protect itself from Syrian missiles. NATO agreed to install MIM-104 Patriot Systems from the United States, Italy, the Netherlands and Germany. |

== See also ==
- List of NATO exercises
- Military and civilian missions of the European Union
- Missions of the Western European Union
- Exercises of the Western Union
- List of non-UN peacekeeping missions
