= NATO intervention in Bosnia and Herzegovina =

NATO operations in between 1992 and 2004

- Part of the Bosnian War
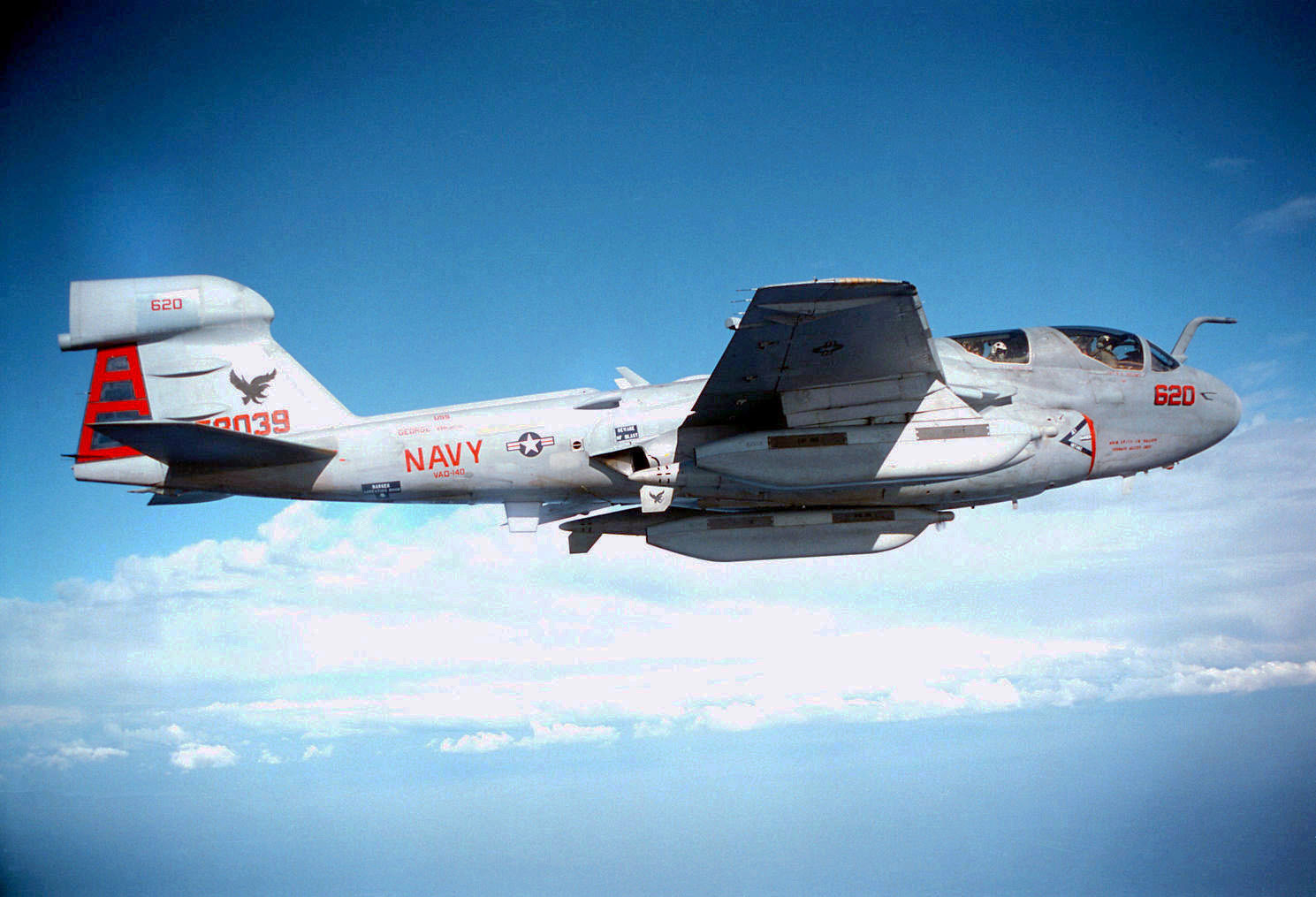
- A Grumman EA-6B Prowler aircraft flying an I-FOR mission
Date	16 July 1992 – 2 December 2004
Location	Bosnia and Herzegovina
Result	End of the Bosnian War

Belligerents
NATO: Netherlands; Norway; Denmark; Germany; Luxembourg; United States; Belgium; Spain; United Kingdom; Italy; Canada; Turkey; Portugal; France; UNPROFOR: France; United Kingdom; India; Sweden; Canada; Belgium; Western European Union (1993–1996); Supported by: Croatia; Republic of Bosnia and Herzegovina; Croatian Republic of Herzeg-Bosnia	Republika Srpska; Republic of Serbian Krajina; Autonomous Province of Western Bosnia Supported by: FR Yugoslavia

Commanders and leaders
(NATO) / (Belgium) Willy Claes (NATO) / (Germany) Manfred Wörner # (NATO) / (United States) Wesley Clark (NATO) / (United States) Leighton Smith (NATO) / (United States) Jeremy Boorda ‡‡ (NATO) / (United Kingdom) Stuart Peach (NATO) / (United States) Michael E. Ryan (United Nations) / (United Kingdom) Rupert Smith (United Nations) / (India) Satish Nambiar (United Nations) / (Sweden) Lars-Eric Wahlgren # (United Nations) / (France) Bernard Janvier (United Nations) / (United Kingdom) Dick Applegate Franjo Tuđman; Gojko Šušak; Janko Bobetko; Alija Izetbegović; Haris Silajdžić; Sefer Halilović; Rasim Delić; Mate Boban; Milivoj Petković; Slobodan Praljak	Radovan Karadžić; Biljana Plavšić; Ratko Mladić; Dragomir Milošević; Milan Martić; Milan Babić; Goran Hadžić; Slobodan Milošević; Vojislav Koštunica; Zoran Đinđić

Strength
60,000 soldiers	50,000–100,000 soldiers

Casualties and losses
NATO: (Italy) (France) 1 Aeritalia G.222 shot down, 8 killed; (France) 1 French Mirage 2000 crashed in the Adriatic sea, pilot rescued; (United Kingdom) 1 BAE Sea Harrier shot down; (United Kingdom) 1 BAE Sea Harrier crashed in the Adriatic Sea; (Spain) 1 Spanish C-212 damaged near Slunj; (United States) 1 F-16C shot down; (France) 2 Dassault Étendard IV damaged; (United States) 1 F/A-18C Hornet crashed in the Adriatic sea, killing pilot; (United States) 2 MQ-1 Predators shot down; (United States) 1 Sikorsky CH-53E Super Stallion damaged; (France) 1 Mirage 2000N shot down; (France) 2 pilots POW; (United States) 1 MQ-1 Predator shot down.; United Nations: (United Nations) 167 killed; (United Nations) over 1,000 POWs; 2 Leopard tanks damaged; (France) 1 AMX-10 RC damaged; (France) 25 wounded (Note: Two killed by gunfire on 27 May 1995. Two killed by sniper fire, on 14 and 15 August 1995, respectively; the latter who was erecting anti-sniper barricades. Two killed by shelling during humanitarian aid convoy on 23 July 1995. Three killed while defusing 90 mm tank shell on 23 April 1995. Nine killed during road accident on 14 March 1995. 1 killed during road accident on 19 August 1995. 1 killed during road accident on 16 September 1995. One wounded by gunfire on 3 December 1993 while protecting humanitarian aid convoy. One wounded by mortar fire at a UN compound on 2 July 1995. One wounded by sniper fire on 11 May 1995. 2 wounded by sniper fire on 7 June 1995. 1 wounded by mine or unexploded shell on 6 January 1996. 17 wounded by gunfire on 27 May 1995 during Battle of Vrbanja Bridge. 12 taken hostage on 27 May 1995 during Battle of Vrbanja Bridge. ~20 Foreign Legion taken hostage during capture of UN Lukevitza barracks on 27 May 1995. 2 pilots captured on 30 August 1995 after Mirage plane shoot down near Pale. 1 AMX-10 RC damaged during an attack on 23 September 1994.); 1 police officer wounded; (Netherlands) 4 wounded (Note: During the Serbian occupation of Srebrenica in July 1995, 4 Dutch peacekeepers were wounded..); 2 wounded (Note: On 5 August 1994, a Ukrainian soldier guarding the Illidža Weapons Collection site was injured during a raid by Bosnian Serb forces. On 8 September 1996, a Ukrainian soldier guarding an election ballot warehouse sustained a gunshot wound.)	(Republika Srpska (1992–1995)) Republika Srpska: (Republika Srpska (1992–1995)) 100 soldiers killed by NATO; 200 soldiers killed by UN; 5 J-21 Jastreb shot down; (Republika Srpska (1992–1995)) 1 ammunition depot destroyed; (Republika Srpska (1992–1995)) 2 command posts destroyed; (Republika Srpska) 1 airstrip damaged; (Republika Srpska (1992–1995)) 4 SA-6 missile sites destroyed; (Republika Srpska (1992–1995)) Several armored vehicles destroyed (Republika Srpska) 3 Pilots killed; 4 T-55 tank disabled; 1 recoilless gun destroyed; 2 anti-aircraft batteries; 1 SA-6 missile site; (Republika Srpska) 338 different targets hit, most of them destroyed (Operation Deliberate Force)
- 152 Serb civilians killed

The NATO intervention in Bosnia and Herzegovina was a series of actions undertaken by NATO whose stated aim was to establish long-term peace during and after the Bosnian War. NATO's intervention began as largely political and symbolic, but gradually expanded to include large-scale air operations and the deployment of approximately 60,000 soldiers of the Implementation Force. At the same time, a large UN peacekeeping force, the United Nations Protection Force (UNPROFOR), made mostly of NATO countries troops, was deployed to Bosnia and Herzegovina from 1992 to 1995. A Rapid Reaction Force (RRF), also under UN mandate, was established around Sarajevo during the later stages of the conflict.

== Early involvement and monitoring ==
NATO involvement in the Bosnian War and the Yugoslav Wars in general began in February 1992, when the alliance issued a statement urging all the belligerents in the conflict to allow the deployment of United Nations peacekeepers. While primarily symbolic, this statement paved the way for later NATO actions.

On July 10, 1992, at a meeting in Helsinki, NATO foreign ministers agreed to assist the United Nations in monitoring compliance with sanctions established under United Nations Security Council resolutions 713 (1991) and 757 (1992). This led to the commencement of Operation Maritime Monitor off the coast of Montenegro, which was coordinated with the Western European Union Operation Sharp Guard in the Strait of Otranto on July 16. On October 9, 1992, the Security Council passed Resolution 781, establishing a no-fly zone over Bosnia-Herzegovina. In response, on October 16, NATO expanded its mission in the area to include Operation Sky Monitor, which monitored Bosnian airspace for flights from the Federal Republic of Yugoslavia.

== Enforcing compliance: 1992–1993 ==
On November 16, 1992, the Security Council issued Resolution 787, which called upon member states to "halt all inward and outbound maritime shipping in order to inspect and verify their cargos" to ensure compliance with sanctions. In response to this resolution, NATO deactivated Maritime Monitor on November 22, and replaced it with Operation Maritime Guard, under which NATO forces were authorized to stop ships and inspect their cargos. Unlike Sky Monitor and Maritime Monitor, this was a true enforcement mission, not just a monitoring one.

NATO's air mission also switched from monitoring to enforcement. The Security Council issued Resolution 816, which authorized states to use measures "to ensure compliance" with the no-fly zone over Bosnia. In response, on April 12, 1993, NATO initiated Operation Deny Flight which was tasked with enforcing the no-fly zone, using fighter aircraft based in the region.

Throughout 1993, the role of NATO forces in Bosnia gradually grew. On June 10, 1993, NATO and the UN agreed that aircraft acting under Deny Flight would provide close air support to UNPROFOR at the request of the UN. On June 15, NATO integrated Operation Maritime Guard and Western European Union naval activities in the region into Operation Sharp Guard, and expanded its role to include greater enforcement powers.

== Growing role of air power: 1994 ==
On February 28, 1994, the scope of NATO involvement in Bosnia increased dramatically. In an incident near Banja Luka, NATO fighters from the USAF, operating under Deny Flight, shot down four Serb jets. This was the first combat operation in the history of NATO and opened the door for a steadily growing NATO presence in Bosnia. In April, the presence of NATO airpower continued to grow during a Serb attack on Goražde. In response, NATO launched its first close air support mission on April 10, 1994, bombing several Serb targets in the area at the request of UN commanders.

== Operations in 1995 and Operation Deliberate Force ==
NATO continued its air operations over Bosnia in the first half of 1995. During this period, American pilot Scott O'Grady was shot down over Bosnia by a surface-to-air missile fired by Bosnian Serb soldiers. He was eventually rescued safely, but his downing caused concern in the United States and other NATO countries about NATO air superiority in Bosnia and prompted some calls for more aggressive NATO action to eliminate Serb anti-air capabilities.

=== Srebrenica and the London Conference ===
In July 1995, the Bosnian Serbs launched an attack on the Bosnian town of Srebrenica, ending with the deaths of approximately 8,000 civilians in the Srebrenica massacre. After the events at Srebrenica, 16 nations met at the London Conference, beginning on July 21, 1995, to consider new options for Bosnia. As a result of the conference, UN Secretary General Boutros Boutros-Ghali gave General Bernard Janvier, the UN military commander, the authority to request NATO airstrikes without consulting civilian UN officials, as a way to streamline the process. As a result of the conference, the North Atlantic Council and the UN also agreed to use NATO air strikes in response to attacks on any of the other safe areas in Bosnia. The participants at the conference also agreed in principle to the use of large-scale NATO air strikes in response to future acts of aggression by Serbs.

=== Operation Deliberate Force ===
After the London Conference, NATO planned an aggressive new air campaign against the Bosnian Serbs. On August 28, 1995, Serb forces launched a mortar attack on Sarajevo's marketplace killing 37 people. Admiral Leighton Smith, the NATO commander recommended that NATO launch retaliatory air strikes under Operation Deliberate Force. On August 30, 1995, NATO officially launched Operation Deliberate Force with large-scale bombing of Serb targets. The airstrikes lasted until September 20, 1995, and involved attacks on 338 individual targets.

== Dayton Accords and IFOR ==
Largely as a result of the bombing under Operation Deliberate Force and changes in the battlefield situation, the belligerents in the Bosnian War met in Dayton, Ohio in November 1995, and signed the Dayton Accords, a peace treaty. As part of the accords, NATO agreed to provide 60,000 troops to deploy to the region, as part of the Implementation Force (IFOR), U.S. designation Operation Joint Endeavor. These forces remained deployed until December 1996, when those remaining in the region were transferred to the Stabilization Force (SFOR). SFOR peacekeepers remained in Bosnia until 2004.
