= 1993 in aviation =

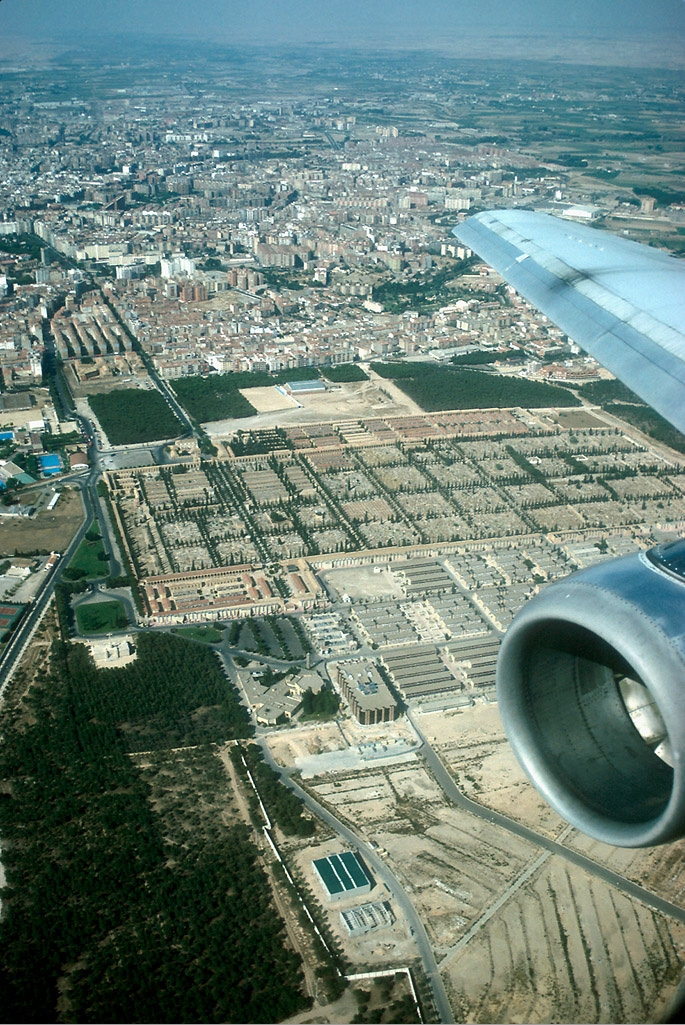
Zaragoza from the air

This is a list of aviation-related events from 1993.

== Events ==
- The 1,000th Boeing 747 comes off the production line 25 years after the first 747 was built.
- Lauda Air Italy commences flight operations.

=== January ===
- During the month, Transaero becomes the first privately owned airline to provide scheduled passenger service in Russia, inaugurating a Moscow-Norilsk route.
- January 6
  - The United States, the United Kingdom, France, and Russia demand that Iraq withdraw all of its surface-to-air missiles from south of the 32nd parallel.
  - Lufthansa CityLine Flight 5634, a Bombardier Dash 8-311, crashes short of the runway on approach to Paris-Charles de Gaulle Airport in Paris, France, killing four of the 23 people on board and injuring all 19 survivors.
- January 7 – Iraq agrees to the American, British, French, and Russian demand that it withdraw all of its surface-to-air missiles from south of the 32nd parallel, and begins to withdraw them. However, Iraq does not remove all of them.
- January 13 – More than 100 American, British, and French aircraft attack Iraqi surface-to-air missile sites near Nasiriyah, Samawah, Najaf and Al-Amarah which Iraq has failed to withdraw north of the 32nd parallel. Around half the Iraqi sites south of the parallel are hit.
- January 15 – Iraqi air defense sites open fire on two United States Air Force F-111 bombers operating over northern Iraq as part of Operation Provide Comfort II.
- January 17
  - Iraqi Air Force Su-22s (NATO reporting name "Fitter") fired on two U.S. Air Force F-16 Fighting Falcons.
  - A U.S. Air Force F-4G Phantom II destroys an Iraqi radar which had been targeting French reconnaissance aircraft over northern Iraq.
  - A U.S. Air Force F-16 participating in Operation Provide Comfort II shoots down an Iraqi Air Force MiG-23 (NATO reporting name "Flogger") which had crossed into the no-fly zone over northern Iraq.
- January 18 – In northern Iraq, U.S. Air Force F-16s bomb Bashiqah Airfield and U.S. Air Force F-4G Phantom IIs attack Iraqi air defense sites. Over the next few days and months, more Iraqi sites fired on the American patrols, and several were attacked.
- January 22 – Three bullets hit the right side of the fuselage of American Airlines Flight 917, an Airbus A300 inbound from Miami with 177 passengers and 13 crew, while either landing or taxiing on the runway after landing in Jorge Chávez International Airport, Lima, Peru. There were no casualties, and damage to the plane was minimal. Despite Shining Path (SP) claiming responsibility for the attack, a subsequent investigation failed to identify the actual assailants. Airport authorities reportedly stated that the source of the shots was accidental, originating from a security guard working on the perimeter. The incident, occurring in the context of a decade-long leftist insurgency against the Peruvian state, happened in the midst of a surge of terrorist attacks and assassinations during that month, which also targeted US interests and businesses.

=== February ===
- The Bolivian Air Force retires the last F-86 Sabre in service amongst the world's air forces.
- February 8 – An Iran Air Tours Tupolev Tu-154M, registered EP-ITD, collides in mid-air with an Iranian Air Force Sukhoi Su-24 military aircraft near Tehran's Mehrabad International Airport in Iran, killing all 133 people aboard both aircraft. This was the deadliest aviation accident to happen in 1993.
- February 10 – McDonnell Douglas produces its 10,000th aircraft
- February 11 – An Ethiopian man, Nebiu Demeke, hijacks Lufthansa Flight 592, an Airbus A310-300 with 103 other people on board, during a flight from Frankfurt-am-Main, Germany, to Addis Ababa, Ethiopia. He forces the aircraft to fly to John F. Kennedy International Airport in New York City, where he surrenders to authorities without further incident. It is the first transatlantic hijacking since 1976.
- February 27 – The United States Air Force begins supply drops into Bosnia and Herzegovina.

=== March ===
- General Dynamics sells the rights to the F-16 Fighting Falcon to the Lockheed Corporation.
- 12 March 1993 - During a series of bombings in Bombay, grenades are thrown at the terminal of the airport. There were no deaths. In addition, explosions went off in the Airport Hotel next to the airport.
- March 15 – Islamic Republic of Iran Air Force bombers attack a hospital in Raniya, Iraq.
- March 24 – South Africa abandons its nuclear weapons programme. President de Klerk announces that the country's six nuclear warheads had been dismantled in 1989.
- March 31 – The United Nations Security Council passes Resolution 816, calling on the North Atlantic Treaty Organization (NATO) to use force in response to the "blatant violations of the ban on military flights in the airspace of Bosnia and Herzegovina" put in place in October 1992 by United Nations Security Council Resolution 781.

=== April ===
- April 1
  - Elizabeth II reviews 70 Royal Air Force aircraft on the ground in celebration of the air force's 75th anniversary. A mass flypast is cancelled due to poor weather.
  - American race car driver Alan Kulwicki is killed along with the other three people on board when a Hooters restaurant chain Fairchild SA-227TT stalls due to icing and crashes on approach to Tri-Cities Regional Airport near Blountville, Tennessee.
- April 6
  - TACA Flight 510, a Boeing 767-2S1ER, runs off the end of the runway at Guatemala City, Guatemala, at 90 kn (100 mph; 170 km/h), and comes to a stop 300 meters (980 feet) off the runway. None of the 236 people on board are injured in the accident itself, although three are injured on the ground after evacuating the aircraft.
  - A crew member aboard China Eastern Airlines Flight 583, a McDonnell Douglas MD-11 with 255 people on board, accidentally deploys the airliner's slats near Alaska's Aleutian Islands, causing the aircraft to oscillate severely. The crew makes an emergency landing at Shemya Air Force Base on Shemya in the Aleutians. The accident kills two people and injures 156, of which 60 are hospitalized.
- April 9 – United States Air Force aircraft attack and destroy an Iraqi anti-aircraft battery.
- April 12 – To enforce United Nations Security Council Resolution 816 authorizing the use of force against prohibited military flights in the airspace of Bosnia and Herzegovina, the North Atlantic Treaty Organization (NATO) discontinues Operation Sky Monitor, which had recorded over 500 violations since it began in October 1992, and commences Operation Deny Flight, which both monitors violations and takes action to enforce the ban.
- April 18
  - Windshear causes Japan Air System Flight 451, a Douglas DC-9-41, to skid off the runway and crash while landing at Hanamaki Airport in Hanamaki, Japan, injuring 19 of the 77 people on board. There are no fatalities, but a fire destroys the aircraft.
  - United States Air Force aircraft attack and destroy an Iraqi radar station.
- April 19 – A Mitsubishi MU-2 turboprop, carrying Governor of South Dakota George S. Mickelson and seven others, suffers a propeller failure and crashes near Dubuque, Iowa, killing everyone on board. Later in the month, investigators' findings prompt the U.S. Federal Aviation Administration to order the immediate inspection of all Hartzell propellers similar to those on the accident aircraft, including those used on various other aircraft types. The U.S. National Transportation Safety Board later attributes the accident to metal fatigue of the propeller hub caused by improper design and manufacturing.
- April 24–25 – In Operation Ashwamedh, Indian Army commandos storm a hijacked Indian Airlines Boeing 737 with 141 people on board at Amritsar, India. They kill the lone hijacker and free everyone else on board unharmed.
- April 26 – Indian Airlines Flight 491, a Boeing 737-2A8, strikes a truck and electric wires and crashes just after takeoff from Aurangabad, Maharashtra, India, killing 55 of the 118 people on board and injuring all 63 survivors.
- April 27 – A Zambian Air Force de Havilland Canada DHC-5 Buffalo crashes in the Atlantic Ocean 500 meters (550 yards) off Libreville, Gabon, killing all 30 people on board. Among the dead are 18 players of the Zambia national team, its coach, and members of its staff, as well as the chairman of the Football Association of Zambia.

=== May ===
- May 2 – Hainan Province Airlines – the future Hainan Airlines – begins scheduled flight service.
- May 5 – Jet Airways begins airline operations.
- May 19 – SAM Colombia Flight 501, a Boeing 727-46, crashes on Mount Paramo Frontino in Colombia while on approach to land at Medellín, killing all 132 people on board.

=== June ===
- June 4 – A wheel-well stowaway inside a Douglas DC-8 survives a flight from Bogotá, Colombia, to Miami, Florida, at an altitude of 35,000 feet (11,000 meters).
- June 29 – A U.S. Air Force F-4G Phantom II participating in Operation Southern Watch fires an anti-radar missile at a radar at an Iraqi anti-aircraft artillery site which had illuminated it and another F-4G, destroying the radar.

=== July ===
- July 1 – The United States Air Force reactivates the Nineteenth Air Force. It had been inactive since July 1973.
- July 12 – American race car driver Davey Allison attempts to land his newly acquired Hughes 369HS helicopter on the infield of the Talladega Superspeedway in Talladega, Alabama, but the helicopter noses up and crashes. Allison dies of his injuries the following morning; his passenger suffers serious injuries but survives.
- July 20 – Thirteen of the fifteen Cessna T-47A radar system trainers operated by the U.S. Navy are destroyed when a roofing contractor accidentally sets fire to a hangar at Forbes Field in Topeka, Kansas, where the aircraft are being stored by Cessna. The navy later replaces them with other aircraft types and the two surviving jets are sold as military surplus.
- July 23 – China Northwest Airlines Flight 2119, a BAe 146–300, is unable to get airborne while attempting to take off from Yinchuan Hedong Airport in Ningxia, China. The flight crew aborts the takeoff, and the airliner overruns the end of the runway and crashes into a lake, killing 55 of the 113 people on board.
- July 26 – Making its third attempt to land in bad weather at Mokpo Airport in Mokpo, South Korea, Asiana Airlines Flight 733, a Boeing 737-5L9, crashes on Ungeo Mountain, killing 68 of the 106 people on board. At the time it is the deadliest aviation accident ever to have occurred in South Korea, and will remain so until 2002. It also is the deadliest accident involving a Boeing 737-500, and will remain so until 2008.
- July 29 – In separate incidents, two U.S. Navy EA-6B Prowlers participating in Operation Southern Watch fire AGM-88 HARM anti-radar missiles at Iraqi radars at surface-to-air missile sites after the radars illuminate the Prowlers.
- July 31 – A Dornier 228 of Everest Air crashed 16 minutes after takeoff. All 19 occupants on board were killed.

=== August ===
- Chicago Express Airlines begins operations.
- August 3 – A private plane crashes into a mountain ridge covered by clouds near Guayaquil, Ecuador, while conducting an aerial reconnaissance survey in western Ecuador for Conservation International, killing four of the seven people on board. American botanist Alwyn Gentry and American ornithologist Theodore A. Parker III are among the dead.
- August 11–14 – Two U.S. Air Force B-1 Lancers complete a round-the-world trip in 47 hours.
- August 18 – U.S. Air Force F-15E Strike Eagles drop four laser-guided bombs on an Iraqi S-125 Neva/Pechora (NATO reporting name "SA-3 Goa") surface-to-air missile site near Mosul.
- August 18 - A DC-8 of American International crashes in Leeward Point Field with 3 people on board, all of which survive with serious injuries.
- August 19 – An Iraqi surface-to-air missile site attacks U.S. Air Force aircraft participating in Operation Provide Comfort II over northern Iraq. They destroy the site in retaliation.
- August 23 – The Russian Federation Air Force flies "open skies" missions over German military airfields.
- August 28 – A Tajik Air Yakovlev Yak-40 crashes at Khorog Airport, killing 82 of 86 on board.

=== September ===
- The national airline of Ecuador, Ecuatoriana de Aviación, suspends all operations due to financial problems. It will not resume flying until June 1996.
- September 11 – Ansett Australia begins its first international service, offering flights to Bali.
- September 14
  - Lufthansa Flight 2904, an Airbus A320-211, overruns the runway on landing at Okęcie International Airport, at Warsaw, Poland, killing two passengers and injuring all of the other 68 people on board. Among the survivors are the German ambassador to Poland, Dr. Franz Bertele, and the Polish opera singer Marcin Bronikowski.
  - The Scaled Composites Pond Racer crashes during the Reno Air Races outside Reno, Nevada, when pilot Rick Brickert attempts a belly landing after one of its engines fails. The Pond Racer overshoots the runway into rough terrain, and Brickert dies in the crash.
- September 17 – The F/A-18 Hornet logs its two-millionth flying hour, achieved in only ten years of operations.
- September 21 – A surface-to-air missile fired by rebels in Sukhumi, Abkhazia, Georgia, shoots down a Transair Georgia Tupolev Tu-134 airliner on approach to Sukhumi-Babusheri Airport. The plane crashes into the Black Sea, killing all 27 people on board.
- September 22 – Another surface-to-air missile fired by rebels in Sukhumi shoots down a Transair Georgia Tupolev Tu-154 airliner while it is attempting to land at Sukhumi-Babusheri Airport. The airliner, reportedly carrying Georgian soldiers, crashes on the runway, killing 108 of the 132 people on board.
- September 23 – Rebels in Sukhumi attack a Transair Georgia airliner on the ground at Sukhumi-Babusheri Airport with mortar or artillery fire while passengers are boarding. The plane is destroyed by a fire and one of its crew members is killed.

=== October ===
- October 1 – The Government of Latvia establishes the Latvia Civil Aviation Administration – forerunner of the Latvian Civil Aviation Agency – as Latvia′s national civil aviation authority.
- October 3 – Two United States Army UH-60 Black Hawk helicopters are shot down by rocket-propelled grenades in Mogadishu, Somalia, in what becomes known as the "Black Hawk Down" incident. U.S. Army forces move to rescue their crews, leading to the First Battle of Mogadishu, which lasts into the next day.
- October 26
  - Attempting to land in heavy rain and high winds, China Eastern Airlines Flight 5398, a McDonnell Douglas MD-82, overruns the end of the runway at Fuzhou Changle International Airport in Fujian, China, and crashes, killing two of the 80 people on board.
  - ValuJet Airlines begins operations.
  - Two people were killed, and thirty were wounded by a car bomb explosion in the parking lot of Lima's Jorge Chávez International Airport
- October 27 – On approach to Namsos Airport (in Namsos Municipality, Norway) in clouds, heavy rain, and turbulence, Widerøe Flight 744, a de Havilland Canada DHC-6-300 Twin Otter, crashes into a hill in neighboring Overhalla Municipality, killing six of the 19 people on board.
- October 31 – Continental Airlines ceases service to nine U.S. and six overseas destinations, including all 24 weekly flights between the United States and Australia and New Zealand and its flights between Guam and Australia.

=== November ===
- During the month, Transaero inaugurates its first international scheduled route outside the 15 post-Soviet states, a Moscow-Tel Aviv service.
- November 4 – China Airlines Flight 605, a Boeing 747-409 with 396 people on board, ground loops on landing at Kai Tak International Airport in Hong Kong, sliding off the runway and into Victoria Harbour. There are no fatalities, but 22 people suffer minor injuries. The aircraft becomes the first Boeing 747-400 to be written off.
- November 13 – After the flight crew misuses its autopilot, China Northern Airlines Flight 6901, a McDonnell Douglas MD-82, crashes on approach to Ürümqi Diwopu International Airport in Ürümqi, Xinjiang, China, killing 12 of the 102 people on board and injuring 60 of the 90 survivors.
- November 22 - Qatar Airways commences operation.
- November 26 – Two Airwork (NZ) aircraft contracted to the New Zealand Police – the Aérospatiale AS 355 F1 helicopter Police Eagle with a civilian pilot and two police officers on board and a Piper Archer PA 28-181 carrying only a civilian pilot – collide over Auckland, New Zealand. Both aircraft crash, killing all four people aboard them and injuring one person on the ground.

=== December ===
- December 1 – A Jetstream 31 operated by Express Airlines II as Northwest Airlink Flight 5719 strikes two ridges near Hibbing, Minnesota, while on approach to Chisholm-Hibbing Airport and crashes, killing all 18 people on board.
- December 15 – Attempting to land at John Wayne Airport in Orange County, California, a chartered IAI 1124 Westwind crashes in Santa Ana, California, after it encounters wake turbulence from a Boeing 757 that had just landed ahead of it. All five people on board are killed, including Rich Snyder, the president of In-N-Out Burger. The U.S. National Transportation Safety Board's ensuing crash investigation will lead the U.S. Federal Aviation Administration to require an adequate distance between heavy aircraft and following light aircraft to allow wake turbulence to diminish to a safe level.
- December 20 – The Malaysian low-cost airline AirAsia is founded. It will begin flight operations in November 1996.
- December 30 – The Government of Colombia passes a law abolishing the Administrative Department of Civil Aeronautics and replacing it with the Special Administrative Unit of Civil Aeronautics, which takes over its role as Colombia′s national civil aviation authority. The change will go into effect on 1 February 1994.

== First flights ==
=== January ===
- January 15 - Rockwell Ranger 2000

=== February ===
- February 22 - McDonnell Douglas MD-90

=== March ===
- March 4 - Dassault Falcon 2000
- March 11 – Airbus A321

=== April ===
- April 2 – Fokker F70
- April 9 - Fournier RF-47

=== July ===
- July 10 – Bell Eagle Eye

=== December ===
- December 18 – Sukhoi Su-34
- December 21 – Cessna Citation X

== Entered service ==
=== February ===
- February 1 - British Aerospace Jetstream 41 with Loganair

=== March ===
- Airbus A330 with Air France
- Airbus A340 with Lufthansa

=== July ===
- July 14 – C-17 Globemaster III

=== October ===
- Dornier 328

== Deadliest crash ==
The deadliest crash of this year was 1993 Tehran mid-air collision, in which a Tupolev Tu-154 collided with an Iranian Air Force Sukhoi Su-24 near Tehran, Iran on 8 February, killing all 133 people on both aircraft. The deadliest single-aircraft accident was SAM Colombia Flight 501, a Boeing 727 which crashed near Medellín, Colombia on 19 May, killing all 132 people on board.
