= 1992 in aviation =

This is a list of aviation-related events from 1992.

== Events ==
- The European Commission approves three new regulations to liberalize air travel within the European Union. EU airlines are gradually given unlimited rights to serve airports in other member states, with the final round of reforms complete by April 1997.
- The operations of Australia's two government airlines, Australian Airlines and Qantas, are merged in preparations for Qantas's privatisation, which will happen in 1995. Australian Airlines ceases to exist as a separate airline until 2002, when it will re-emerge as a low-cost airline flying to destinations in Southeast Asia.
- The United States National Aeronautics and Space Administration initiates the Advanced General Aviation Transport Experiments (AGATE) program to develop technology to help revitalize the slumping general aviation industry.
- Air Ukraine is founded.
- Alyemda is renamed Alyemda Air Yemen.

=== January ===
- Iraqi Airways resumes fixed-wing aircraft service for the first time since the Gulf War in 1991, flying a domestic route between Baghdad and Basra. Flights soon cease, however, because of a United Nations ruling that they are not permitted under the terms of the ceasefire that ended the war.
- January 7 – A Yugoslav Air Force Mikoyan-Gurevich MiG-21 (NATO reporting name "Fishbed") attacks two Italian Army Agusta-Bell AB-206L LongRanger helicopters operated for the European Community Monitor Mission. The MiG-21 shoots down one of the helicopters with an R-60 air-to-air missile near Podrute, Croatia, killing all five European Community observers aboard. The other helicopter crash-lands while attempting to avoid the MiG-21, but its occupants survive.
- January 10 – In response to the outbreak of the Yugoslav Wars, Italy bans all air traffic between itself and the Socialist Federal Republic of Yugoslavia.
- January 11 – The United States Federal Aviation Administration approves a helicopter rating for a pilot based solely on flight simulator performance for the first time.
- January 15 – The United States Air Force loses a Lockheed U-2 in the Sea of Japan.
- January 18 – The United States Armed Forces retire their last F-4 Phantom II from front-line service.
- January 20 – Air Inter Flight 148, an Airbus A320-111, crashes in the Vosges Mountains near Barr, France, while circling to land at Strasbourg, France, killing 87 of the 96 people on board. Facing tough competition from French high-speed TGV trains, Air Inter had encouraged its pilots to fly at high speeds at low altitudes, and had not installed ground proximity warning systems on its airliners because such systems generated too many nuisance alarms during high-speed, low-altitude flight. It is the deadliest accident in Air Inter's history.
- January 28 – An Azerbaijani Air Force Mil Mi-8 transport helicopter is shot down near Shusha, Azerbaijan, killing all 44 people on board.
- January 31 – Trans World Airlines files for reorganization under Chapter 11 of the U.S. Bankruptcy Code.

=== February ===
- February 14 – Passengers aboard Aerolíneas Argentinas Flight 386 – a Boeing 747-287B en route from Lima, Peru, to Los Angeles, California, with 356 people on board – are inadvertently fed an in-flight meal that includes shrimp tainted with cholera. Seventy-six people become ill, and one of them dies.
- February 15 – L'Express Airlines is grounded, its nine aircraft repossessed by the finance company of their manufacturer, Beechcraft, due to non-payment.
- February 28 – L'Express Airlines officially shuts down its operations.

=== March ===
- Two United States Air Force B-52 Stratofortresses visit a Russian Federation Air Force base near Moscow, the first visit by American military aircraft since World War II to any place that had been part of the Soviet Union before its dissolution in December 1991.
- March 22 – USAir Flight 405, a Fokker F28 Fellowship, cannot gain lift after takeoff from LaGuardia Airport in New York City due to icing of the wings and airframe. It crashes into Flushing Bay, killing 27 of the 51 people on board and injuring 21 of the 24 survivors.
- March 24 – The United States Department of Transportation announces that it will sign "open skies" treaties with any countries that wish to reciprocate. The first "open skies" treaty is signed between the United States and the Netherlands later in the year.

=== April ===
- April 5 – The Islamic Republic of Iran Air Force bombs bases in northern Iraq belonging to the Iranian Kurd Kurdistan Democratic Party of Iran. The Iraqi Air Force violates the no-fly zone over northern Iraq north of the 36th parallel by scrambling jets to intercept the Iranian planes, but aircraft involved in Operation Provide Comfort II to enforce the no-fly zone do not interfere.
- April 7 – Azerbaijan Airlines is established.
- April 22 – The YF-22 prototype of the F-22 Raptor is damaged beyond repair.
- April 24 – A U.S. Air Force C-130 Hercules carrying out an anti-narcotics mission over Peru is attacked by Peruvian Air Force Sukhoi Su-22s (NATO reporting name "Fitter").

=== May ===
- S7 Airlines starts operations.
- Two Russian Federation Air Force Tupolev Tu-95s visit Barksdale Air Force Base in the United States.
- May 1 – Trans World Airlines chairman Carl Icahn sells the airline's route authorities to London from Baltimore and Philadelphia to USAir for $50 million.
- May 2 – In response to the outbreak of the Yugoslav Wars, the United States announces an embargo on all air traffic between itself and the Socialist Federal Republic of Yugoslavia.
- May 8 – Excavations begin at Devonport Naval Base, near Auckland, in search of two Boeing seaplanes – the first two aircraft built by that company – supposedly buried there in 1919. The search proves fruitless.
- May 16 – The 2,000th C-130 Hercules rolls off the production line.
- May 20 – In response to the outbreak of the Yugoslav Wars, the United Nations enacts sanctions on the Socialist Federal Republic of Yugoslavia that, among other things, bring all international commercial air travel to the country to a halt. It is the first forcible termination of international air travel to Yugoslavia since the German invasion of the Kingdom of Yugoslavia in April 1941.

=== June ===
- The Portuguese regional airline Portugália begins international scheduled service from Lisbon and Porto, Portugal.
- June 1 – The United States Air Force's Strategic Air Command is disestablished and replaced by United States Strategic Command.
- June 6 – Following faulty instrument readings during a night flight, the crew of Copa Airlines Flight 201, a Boeing 737-204 Advanced, unwittingly dives the airliner into the ground in a jungle area of the Darién Gap in Panama. The plane strikes the ground at 400 knots (460 mph; 740 km/h), killing all 47 people on board. It remains the deadliest accident in the history of Panamanian aviation and the only fatal accident in the history of Copa Airlines.
- June 7 – American Eagle Flight 5456, a CASA C-212 operated by Executive Airlines, crashes into a swamp on approach to Eugenio María de Hostos Airport in Mayagüez, Puerto Rico, in heavy rain, killing all five people on board.
- June 8 – GP Express Flight 861, a Beechcraft Model 99, crashes into a wooded ridge in Calhoun County, Alabama, while on approach to a landing at Anniston Metropolitan Airport in Anniston, Alabama, killing three of the six people on board.

=== July ===
- July 1 – The United States Air Force inactivates the Air Force Logistics Command and the Air Force Systems Command.
- July 2 – Braniff International Airlines, Inc.—the third airline to use the Braniff name—permanently ceases flight operations.
- July 6 – The final F-4 Phantom IIs are retired from Royal Air Force service.
- July 24 – Attempting to land at Pattimura Airport on Ambon Island in Indonesia during a heavy thunderstorm, Mandala Airlines Flight 660, a Vickers Viscount 816, crashes into Mount Lalaboy, killing all 70 people on board.
- July 30 – The flight crew of Trans World Airways Flight 843, a Lockheed L-1011 Tristar with 292 people on board, aborts their takeoff from John F. Kennedy International Airport in New York City, and the plane crashes and is destroyed by a fire. Passengers and crew evacuate in only two minutes; there are no fatalities, and only 10 people are injured.
- July 31
  - Thai Airways International Flight 311, an Airbus A310-304, crashes in Langtang National Park while on approach to Tribhuvan International Airport in Kathmandu, Nepal, killing all 113 people on board.
  - China General Aviation Flight 7552, a Yakovlev 42D, crashes into a pond just after takeoff from Nanjing Dajiaochang Airport in Nanjing, China, killing 108 of the 126 people on board and injuring all 18 survivors.

=== August ===
- August 26 – U.S. President George H. W. Bush announces a no-fly zone over southern Iraq south of the 33rd parallel to protect Shiite rebels and civilians there from attacks by the Iraqi Air Force.
- August 27 – Joint Task Force Southwest Asia, under the command of United States Central Command and consisting of forces of the United States, United Kingdom, France, and Saudi Arabia, commences Operation Southern Watch to enforce the new no-fly zone over southern Iraq. It will continue until the invasion of Iraq on 19 March 2003.
- August 27 – Aeroflot Flight 2808 crashes while landing at Ivanovo Yuzhny Airport, killing all 84 people on board (including 21 children).
- August 27 - A modified de Havilland Canada DHC-4 Caribou crashes at Gimli Industrial Park Airport seconds after takeoff due to a failure to remove the plane's gust lock control in the cockpit. All 3 aboard were killed upon impact.
- August 28 – Four U.S. Air Force F-4G Phantom II aircraft of the 52nd Fighter Wing arrive at Dhahran Airfield in Saudi Arabia to participate in Operation Southern Watch.

=== September ===
- September 4 – A U.S. Air Force B-2 Spirit bomber drops a bomb for the first time.
- September 26 – A Nigerian Air Force Lockheed C-130H Hercules aircraft crashes shortly after takeoff from Lagos, Nigeria after three of its four engines fail. All 158 people on board, including 8 foreign nationals, are killed. The crash remains the deadliest one involving a Lockheed C-130 Hercules to date.
- September 28 – Pakistan International Airlines Flight 268, an Airbus A300B4-203, crashes into the southern slope of the Chure Hills on approach to Tribhuvan International Airport in Kathmandu, Nepal, killing all 167 passengers and crew. The crash of Flight 268 is the deadliest one to happen in Nepal.

=== October ===
- October 1 – Ukraine International Airlines is founded. It will begin flight operations on November 25.
- October 4 – El Al Flight 1862, a Boeing 747-200 cargo freighter, crashes in the Bijlmermeer neighborhood of Amsterdam, the Netherlands, after takeoff, killing all four people on board and killing 39 and injuring 26 people on the ground.
- October 9 – The United Nations Security Council passes Resolution 781, establishing a no-fly zone for unauthorized military flights in the airspace of Bosnia and Herzegovina.
- October 15 – Russian police detain 60 Russian scientists and their families as they prepare to board a plane at Sheremetyevo Airport in Moscow. Under questioning, the scientists admit that they were attempting to travel to North Korea to help the North Koreans develop a modern ballistic missile force.
- October 16
  - The North Atlantic Treaty Organization (NATO) begins Operation Sky Monitor, in which NATO E-3 Sentry Airborne Warning and Control System (AWACS) aircraft based in Germany, Italy, Greece, and the United Kingdom monitor the airspace of Bosnia and Herzegovina. The operation will document more than 500 violations of the military no-fly zone created under United Nations Security Council Resolution 781 by April 1993.
  - Flight Lieutenant Nicky Smith, graduates from 89 Course at Shawbury, England, to become the Royal Air Force's first female helicopter pilot.

=== November ===
- November 25 – Ukraine International Airlines begins flight operations. Its first flight is from Kyiv to London.
- November 27 – During a coup attempt by Venezuela Air Force and Venezuelan Navy officers against the Government of Venezuela, rebel forces seize control of most air bases in Venezuela and rebel aircraft bomb the presidential palace and an army barracks in Caracas. Two pilots loyal to the government hijack two F-16A Fighting Falcons and use them to shoot down three rebel aircraft, two OV-10 Broncos and an AT-27 Tucano. The coup fails, and 93 rebel personnel flee to Iquitos, Peru, in C-130 Hercules aircraft.

=== December ===
- December 16 – The North Atlantic Treaty Organization votes to enforce the no-fly zone over Bosnia and Herzegovina established by United Nations Security Council Resolution 781 with military force if requested to by the United Nations.
- December 21 – During a thunderstorm, Martinair Flight 495, a McDonnell Douglas DC-10, makes a hard landing at Faro Airport in Faro, Portugal, collapsing the starboard main landing gear, setting the right wing fuel tank on fire, and breaking the fuselage in two. The crash kills 56 of the 340 people on board and badly injures 106 of the 284 survivors.
- December 22 – Libyan Arab Airlines Flight 1103, a Boeing 727-2L5, collides with a Libyan Air Force Mikoyan-Gurevich MiG-23 (NATO reporting name "Flogger") while Flight 1103 is on approach to land at Tripoli International Airport in Tripoli, Libya. Both aircraft crash, killing all 157 people aboard the airliner and both crewmen of the MiG-23.
- December 27 – For the first time, the Iraqi Air Force challenges the no-fly zone established in August under Operation Southern Watch. An Iraqi MiG-25 (NATO reporting name "Foxbat") flies south of the 32nd parallel but flees back across the parallel from pursuing U.S. Air Force F-15 Eagles before they can attack it. Other Iraqi fighters dodge back and forth across the parallel later in the day. Finally, a U.S. Air Force F-16 Fighting Falcon of the 33rd Tactical Fighter Squadron piloted by Lieutenant Colonel Gary L. North shoots down a MiG-25. It is the first combat kill by an F-16 in U.S. Air Force service, and the first kill by an AIM-120 AMRAAM air-to-air missile.

== First flights ==
=== March ===
- March 26 – Saab 2000

=== April ===
- Sikorsky Cypher
- April 11 – Guimbal Cabri G2
- April 26 – Sequoia 300 Sequoia

=== July ===
- July 8 – Bede BD-10

=== August ===
- August 20 – HAL Dhruv

=== October ===
- October 20 – Yakovlev Yak-112

=== November ===
- November 2 – Airbus A330

=== December ===
- December 17 – NPO Molniya Molniya-1
- December 18 – McDonnell Douglas MD 900 Explorer

== Entered service ==
=== December ===
- December 29 – Ilyushin Il-96 with Aeroflot

== Deadliest crash ==
The deadliest crash of this year was Pakistan International Airlines Flight 268, an Airbus A300 which crashed in mountainous terrain near Kathmandu, Nepal on 28 September, killing all 167 people on board.
