= United Nations Security Council Resolution 786 =

1992 Bosnia resolution

UN Security Council Resolution 786
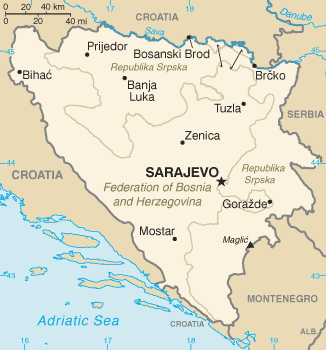
- Bosnia and Herzegovina
- Date: 10 November 1992
- Meeting no.: 3,133
- Code: S/RES/786 (Document)
- Subject: Bosnia and Herzegovina
- Voting summary: 15 voted for; None voted against; None abstained
- Result: Adopted

Security Council composition
- Permanent members: China; France; Russia; United Kingdom; United States
- Non-permanent members: Austria; Belgium; Cape Verde; Ecuador; Hungary; India; Japan; Morocco; Venezuela; Zimbabwe

United Nations Security Council resolution 786, adopted unanimously on 10 November 1992, after reaffirming Resolution 781 (1992), the Council approved a recommendation by the Secretary-General Boutros Boutros-Ghali to increase the strength of the United Nations Protection Force (UNPROFOR) in Bosnia and Herzegovina by 75 observers to monitor the ban on military flights over the country.

The resolution reaffirmed the no-fly zone relating to military flights over Bosnia and Herzegovina and welcomed the advance deployment of observers from UNPROFOR and the European Community Monitoring Mission at airfields in Bosnia and Herzegovina, Croatia and the Federal Republic of Yugoslavia (Serbia and Montenegro). It called on all parties concerned and governments to co-operate with the United Nations Force, asking them to direct all requests for authorisations of all flights relating to UNPROFOR and humanitarian assistance to the Protection Force.

The council also reiterated its determination to consider all violations of the no-fly zone, noting it would consider further measures if necessary.

== See also ==
- Breakup of Yugoslavia
- Bosnian War
- List of United Nations Security Council Resolutions 701 to 800 (1991–1993)
- Yugoslav Wars
