= Operation Sky Monitor =

NATO mission in Bosnia and Herzegovina

- Part of the NATO intervention in Bosnia
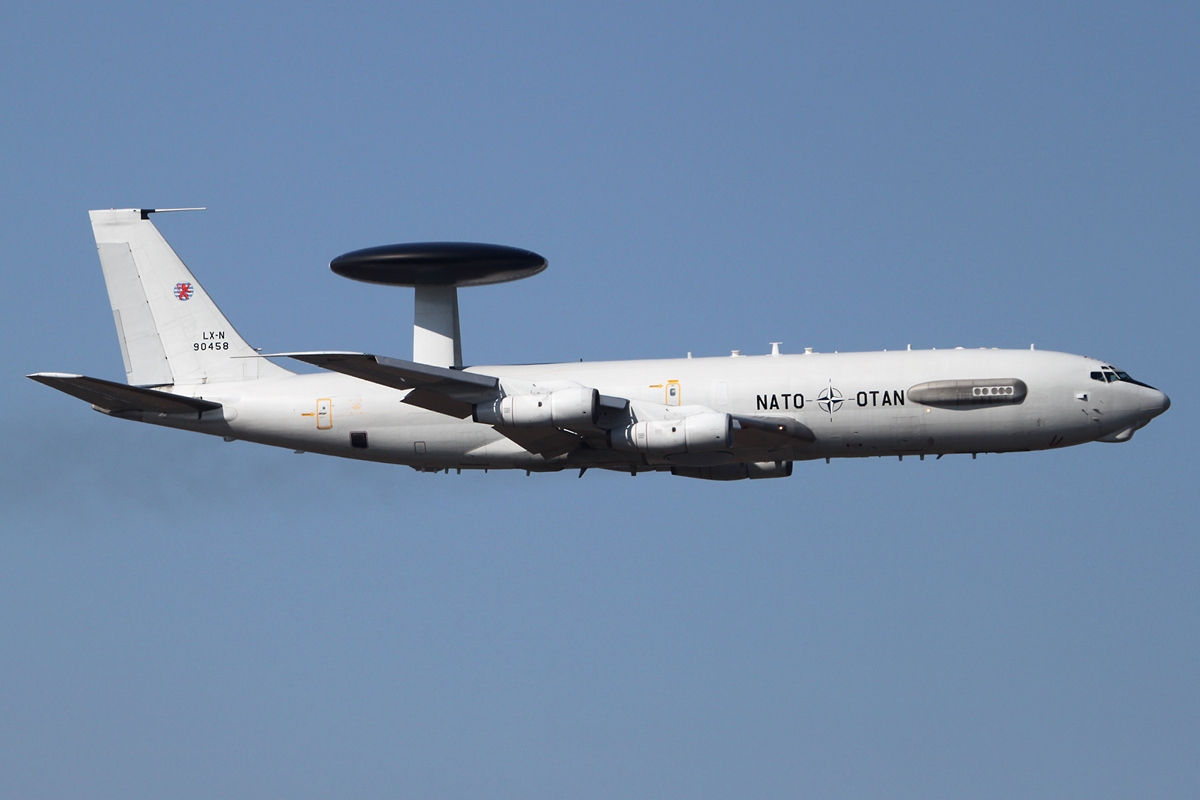
- A NATO E-3 Sentry, the aircraft type used for monitoring in Operation Sky Monitor
- Objective: Monitoring of no-fly zone over Bosnia
- Date: October 16, 1992 – April 12, 1993
- Executed by: Allied Forces Southern Europe

Operation Sky Monitor was a NATO mission to monitor unauthorized flights in the airspace of Bosnia and Herzegovina during the Bosnian War. The operation began in response to United Nations Security Council Resolution 781, which established a ban on the use of military aircraft in Bosnian airspace, and requested the aid of member states in monitoring compliance. Beginning on October 16, 1992, NATO monitored violations of the no-fly zone using E-3 Sentry NAEW aircraft based in Germany, Italy, Greece, and the United Kingdom. The operation documented more than 500 violations of the no-fly zone by April 1993. In response to this high volume of unauthorized flights, the Security Council passed Resolution 816, which authorized NATO to enforce the no-fly zone, and engage violators. In response, NATO deactivated Sky Monitor on April 12, 1993, transferring its forces to the newly established Operation Deny Flight.

== Background ==
On September 25, 1991, at the beginning of the Yugoslav wars, the United Nations Security Council issued Resolution 713, which established "a general and complete embargo on all deliveries of weapons and military equipment to Yugoslavia", with the goal of reducing violence and bloodshed throughout the country. In May, the Security Council reaffirmed the embargo in Resolution 757, and added a provision for a naval force to monitor compliance with the embargo. In resolution 757, the council also called on states to "deny permission to any aircraft to take off, land in or overfly their territory if it is destined to land in or had taken off from the territory of the Federal Republic of Yugoslavia", setting the precedent for later anti-air measures.

In response to resolution 757, NATO began to perform its first operations on behalf of the United Nations on July 16, 1992, with Operation Maritime Monitor, which monitored violations of Security Council Resolutions by ships. As a part of Maritime Monitor, NATO dispatched E-3 Sentry airborne early warning aircraft to the region to monitor sea traffic. These aircraft flew more than 200 missions over the course of the operation.

On October 9, 1992, the Security Council passed resolution 781. In the resolution, the Security Council expressed concern about the use of aircraft by the belligerents in the War in Bosnia and established a formal "ban on military flights in the airspace of Bosnia and Herzegovina". It also called upon member states to help the United Nations Protection Force (UNPROFOR) in monitoring "compliance with the ban on military flights". Shortly thereafter, on October 15, NATO aircraft operating under Maritime Monitor began monitoring flights over Bosnia for the UN. The essential goal of this mission was to conduct surveillance in order to determine whether or not the various parties in the conflict were respecting the UN no-fly zone. The next day, October 16, Operation Sky Monitor officially began when NATO planes expanded their monitoring with flight paths over the Adriatic.

== Operation ==
During Operation Sky Monitor, aircraft operated in two "orbits", one over the Adriatic established on October 16, and a second one over Hungary, established with the permission of the Hungarian government on October 31. Both of these orbits operated 24 hours a day, providing constant surveillance of Bosnian airspace. The first flight over Hungary on October 31 was an important milestone in NATO history as it was the "first operational mission in a former Warsaw Pact nation" for the alliance. Even more significantly, Hungary agreed that if a NATO aircraft were attacked in its airspace, the Hungarian Air Force would provide support with Mikoyan-Gurevich MiG-21 fighters. This support never became necessary, but it marked another important milestone, actual military cooperation between NATO and the former Warsaw Pact.

The monitoring aircraft of Sky Monitor were initially drawn from the NATO Airborne Early Warning squadron based at NATO Air Base Geilenkirchen in Germany, but Aviano Air Base in Italy, Preveza in Greece, and Trapani in Italy were all used as forward operating bases. As the operation expanded, the British No. 8 Squadron RAF and the French E-3F squadron at Avord Air Base were also used. All of these NATO forces fell under the authority of Allied Forces Southern Europe, commanded by Admiral Jeremy Boorda of the United States Navy. Eleven NATO countries provided personnel or aircraft for the operation: Belgium, Canada, Denmark, Germany, Greece, Italy, the Netherlands, Norway, Portugal, Turkey, and the United States.

The rules of engagement for Sky Monitor were very restrictive. Because the purpose of the operation was to monitor, rather than prevent, unauthorized flights, participating aircraft were only authorized to use force in self-defense. Furthermore, under the rules of engagement, NATO forces were directed to take evasive action if attacked rather than engage an opponent if at all possible. As a result of the strict rules of engagement, no NATO forces were engaged in combat during Operation Sky Monitor.

Sky Monitor documented many violations of the no-fly zone, the most significant of which came in March 1993, when Serb aircraft bombed two Bosniak villages. This violation, the first "combat violation" of the no-fly zone, led to calls for NATO to actively enforce the zone, rather than just monitoring compliance.

== Results ==
At the beginning of April 1993, NATO had documented more than 500 violations of the no-fly zone over Bosnia, including violations from all sides in the conflict. Out of these numerous violations, however, NATO documented only one that it considered a "combat mission". Although most of the violations were not combat missions, NATO had decided even before the end of Sky Monitor that the UN ban was ineffective. On December 18, 1992, the NATO members voted to enforce the no-fly zone with military force if requested by the United Nations. This escalation of NATO involvement also gained the crucial backing of US President-elect Bill Clinton in December, when he told the press that he had "been in favor of enforcing the no-fly zone for some time."

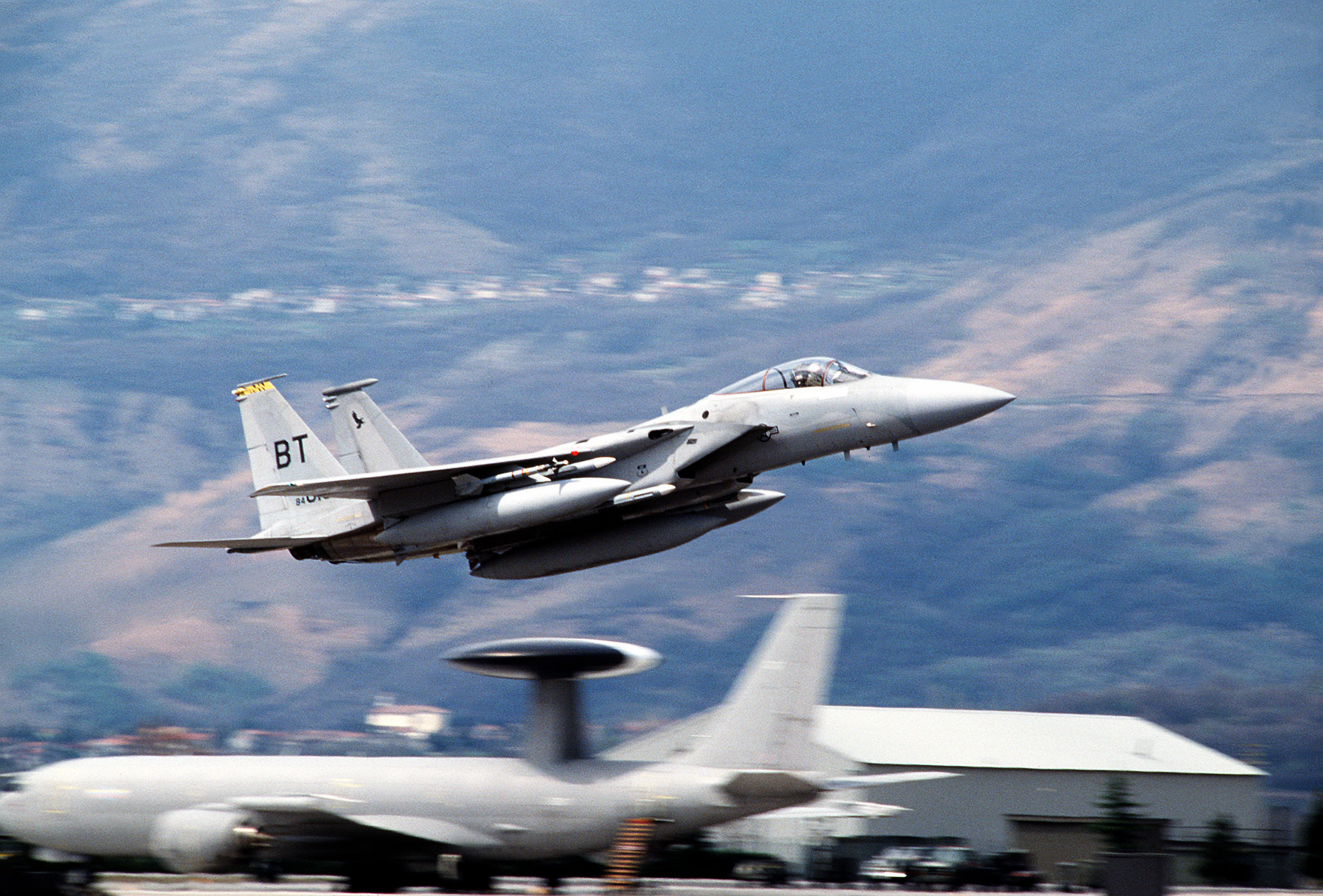
A US Air Force F-15C takes off on a sortie to enforce the no-fly zone during Operation Deny Flight

The UN called for NATO to use force in response to the "blatant violations of the ban on military flights in the airspace of Bosnia and Herzegovina" with Security Council Resolution 816 on March 31, 1993. The resolution authorized UN member states to "take all necessary measures" in order "to ensure compliance" with the no-fly zone. As a result of this new resolution, NATO deactivated Sky Monitor, and began Operation Deny Flight on April 12, 1993. Under Deny Flight, NATO forces continued to monitor and document unauthorized flights, but they were also authorized to enforce the zone and engage violators if necessary.

Operation Sky Monitor was the first of many NATO air operations in the Balkans, including the more significant Operation Deliberate Force and Operation Allied Force. Sky Monitor was also NATO's first out of area air operation, and one of its first collaborative missions with the United Nations. Thus, it set the precedent for future NATO-UN cooperation, based on a model where NATO forces would use their superior technical expertise to assist the UN in pursuing its broader mission. Sky Monitor also affected military policy, as it proved the utility of the E-3 Sentry, NATO's principal aircraft in the operation, for monitoring missions under a wide variety of circumstances. Thus, the E-3 became an important part of NATO's planning for later operations.
