= Operation Deny Flight =

1993–95 NATO operation in the Bosnian War

- Part of the NATO intervention in Bosnia and Herzegovina during the Bosnian War
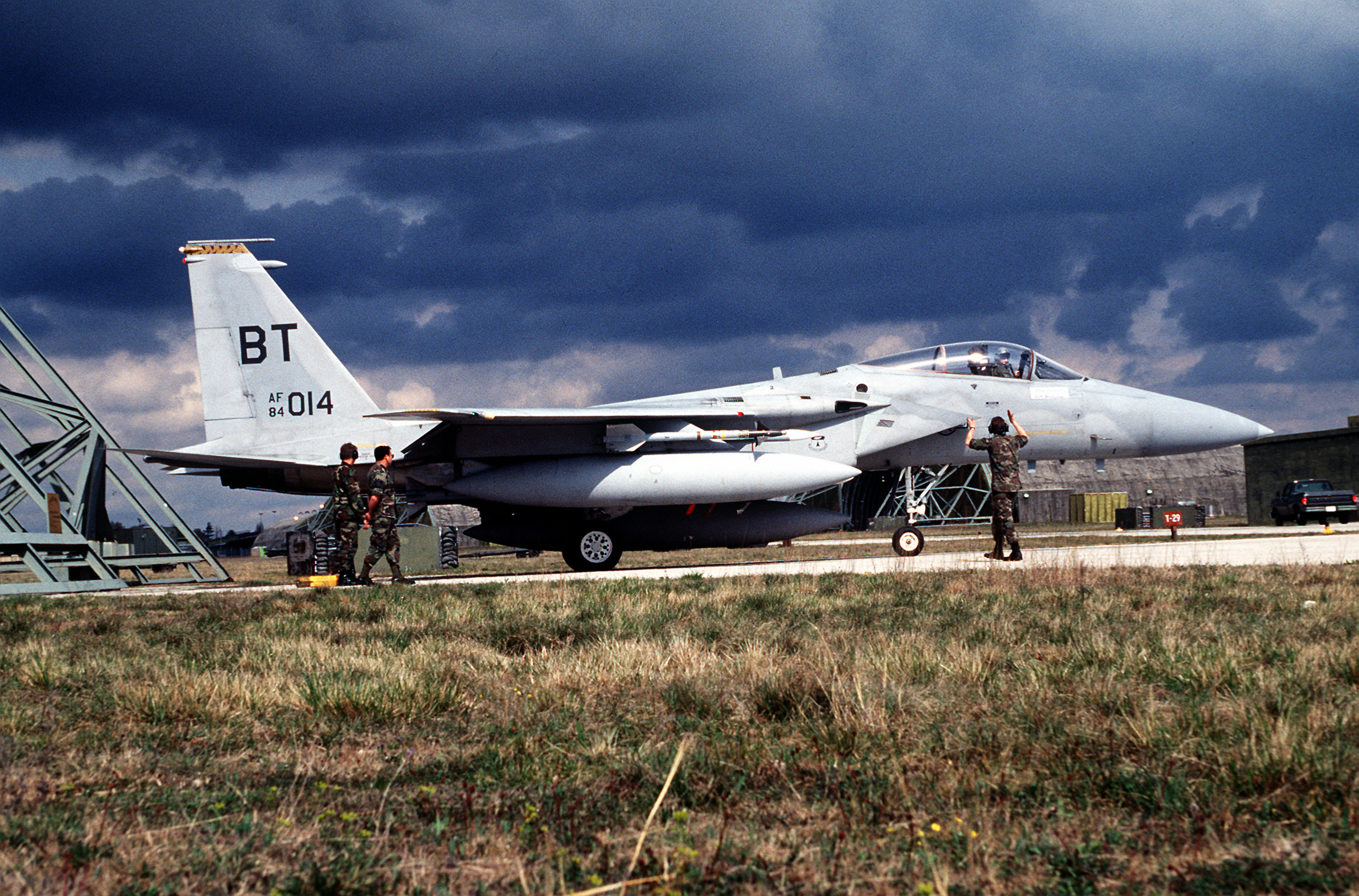
- An F-15C is met by maintenance personnel at Aviano Air Base during Operation Deny Flight
Date	12 April 1993 – 20 December 1995; (2 years, 8 months, 1 week, and 1 day)
Location	Bosnia and Herzegovina and Croatia
Result	Inconclusive

Belligerents
NATO; United Nations	Republika Srpska; Serbian Krajina

Commanders and leaders
(United States) Jeremy M. Boorda (1993–1994) (United States) Leighton W. Smith (1994–1995)	(Republika Srpska (1992–1995)) Radovan Karadžić (Republika Srpska (1992–1995)) Ratko Mladić (Republic of Serbian Krajina) Milan Martić

Casualties and losses
(Italy) (France) 1 Aeritalia G.222 shot down, 8 killed (France) 1 French Mirage 2000 crashed in the Adriatic sea, pilot rescued (France) 2 Dassault Étendard IV damaged (United Kingdom) 1 BAE Sea Harrier shot down (United Kingdom) 1 BAE Sea Harrier crashed in the Adriatic Sea (Spain) 1 Spanish C-212 damaged near Slunj (United States) 1 F-16C shot down (United States) 1 F/A-18C Hornet crashed in the Adriatic sea, killing pilot (United States) 2 MQ-1 Predators destroyed (United States) 1 Sikorsky CH-53E Super Stallion damaged (United Kingdom) 1 SAS commando killed (United Nations) Hundreds of POWs	(Republika Srpska (1992–1995)) 5 J-21 Jastrebs destroyed (Republika Srpska (1992–1995)) 1 ammunition depot destroyed (Republika Srpska (1992–1995)) 2 command posts destroyed (Republika Srpska) 1 airstrip damaged (Republika Srpska (1992–1995)) 4 SA-6 missile sites destroyed (Republika Srpska (1992–1995)) Several armored vehicles destroyed (Republika Srpska) 3 pilots killed (Republika Srpska) 2 soldiers killed

Operation Deny Flight was a North Atlantic Treaty Organization (NATO) operation that began on 12 April 1993 as the enforcement of a United Nations (UN) no-fly zone over Bosnia and Herzegovina. The United Nations and NATO later expanded the mission of the operation to include providing close air support for UN troops in Bosnia and carrying out coercive air strikes against targets in Bosnia. Twelve NATO members contributed forces to the operation and, by its end on 20 December 1995, NATO pilots had flown 100,420 sorties.

The operation played a noticeable role in shaping both the Bosnian War and NATO. The operation included the first combat engagement in NATO's history, a 28 February 1994 air battle over Banja Luka, and in April 1994, NATO aircraft first bombed ground targets in an operation near Goražde. Cooperation between the UN and NATO during the operation also helped pave the way for future joint operations. Although it helped establish UN–NATO relations, Deny Flight led to conflict between the two organizations. Most notably, significant tension arose between the two after UN peacekeepers were taken as hostages in response to NATO bombing.

The operations of Deny Flight spanned more than two years of the Bosnian War and played an important role in the course of that conflict. The no-fly zone operations of Deny Flight proved successful in preventing significant use of air power by any side in the conflict. Additionally, the air strikes flown during Deny Flight led to Operation Deliberate Force, a massive NATO bombing campaign in Bosnia that played a key role in ending the war.

== Background and Operation Sky Monitor ==
In October 1992, at the beginning of the Bosnian War, the United Nations Security Council passed Resolution 781. This resolution prohibited unauthorized military flights in Bosnian airspace. Following the resolution, NATO began Operation Sky Monitor during which NATO forces monitored violations of the no-fly zone, without taking any military action against violators. By April 1993, NATO forces had documented more than 500 violations of the no-fly zone. In response to these "blatant" violations of Bosnian air space, and implicitly of resolution 781, the UN Security Council issued Resolution 816.

While Resolution 781 prohibited only military flights, Resolution 816 prohibited all flights in Bosnian air space, except for those expressly authorized by the UN Flight Coordination Center in Zagreb. The resolution also authorized UN member states to "take all necessary measures ... to ensure compliance" with the no-fly zone restrictions. In response to this resolution, NATO commenced Operation Deny Flight on 12 April 1993. Initially Deny Flight was intended only to enforce the no-fly zone; however several NATO members, including the United States, were eager to find ways to end the war and improve the situation of civilians, and hoped that military action could do so. The US had already taken unilateral actions to aid civilians caught in the conflict by dropping humanitarian supplies into Bosnia under Operation Provide Promise, and many US officials argued for the use of military force. These officials were eager to expand US air operations through Deny Flight, hoping that an aggressive no-fly zone and possible air strikes would end the conflict more quickly. NATO forces suffered its first loss on the second day of operations, when a French Mirage 2000 crashed in the Adriatic Sea due to mechanical failure. The pilot ejected safely.

== Enforcement of no-fly zone ==
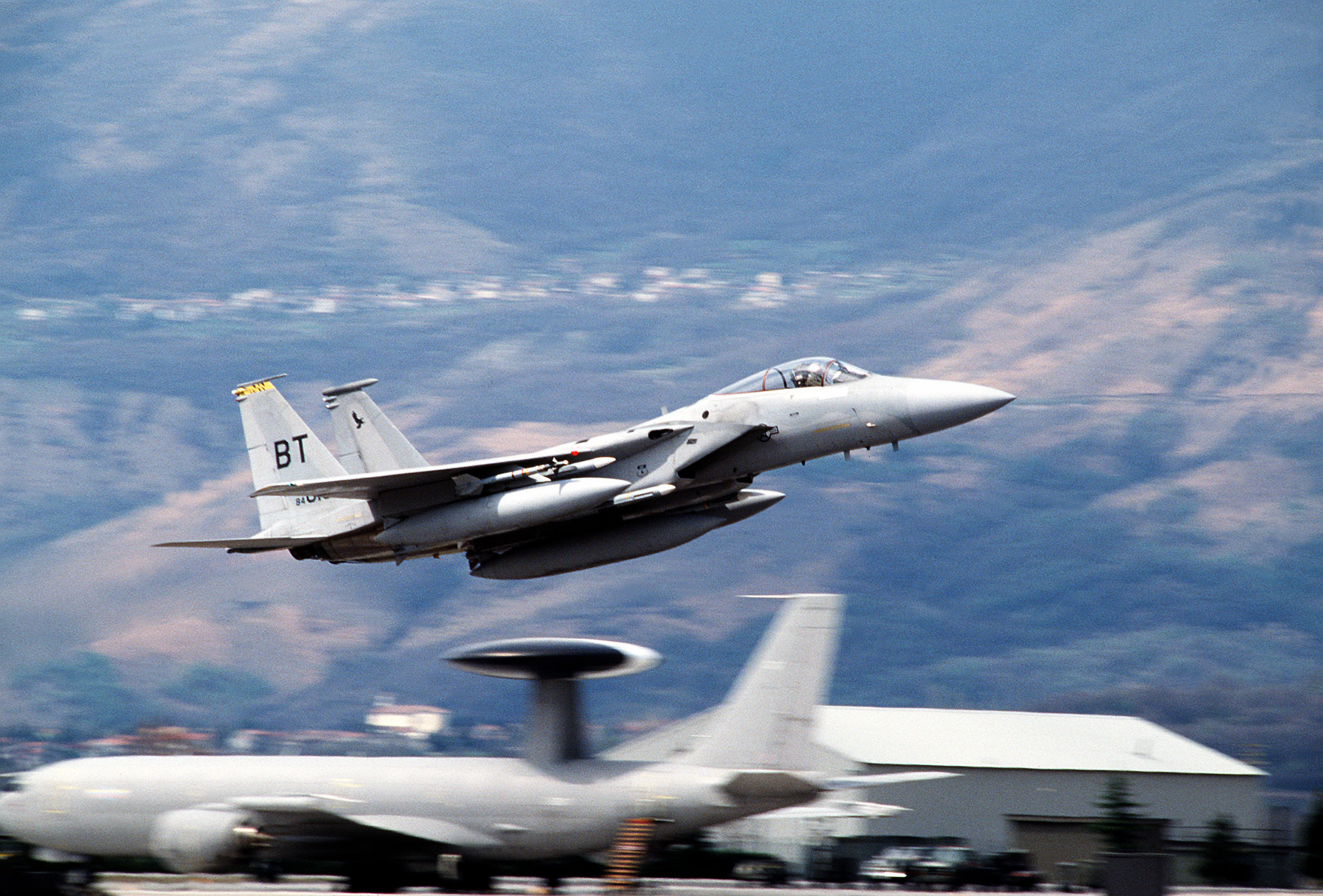
A USAF F-15C takes off for a sortie to enforce the no-fly zone

After its adoption, Operation Deny Flight was relatively successful in preventing fixed-wing aircraft from flying over restricted air space in Bosnia. During the monitoring phase of Operation Sky Monitor, unauthorized fixed-wing flights averaged twenty per month, but during Deny Flight, the average was three. During the conflict, there were only an estimated 32 fixed-wing military aircraft in Bosnia, all of them former Yugoslav Air Force planes under the control of the Bosnian Serbs. Thus, NATO primarily needed to prevent incursions into Bosnian airspace from Croatia and Serbia.

The first serious violation to the no-fly zone came on 28 February 1994, when six Serb J-21 Jastreb jets bombed a Bosnian factory. US Air Force F-16s shot down four of the six Serb jets over Banja Luka. This engagement was the first combat engagement of Operation Deny Flight, and its only significant air-to-air combat engagement. Perhaps more importantly, the Banja Luka incident was also the first combat engagement in the history of NATO. The Serbs acknowledged the loss of a fifth aircraft in the incident.

While Deny Flight was relatively successful in stopping flights of fixed-wing aircraft, NATO forces found it very difficult to stop helicopter flights, which presented a more complicated challenge. All sides in the conflict used helicopters extensively for non-military purposes, and some of these flights were authorized by the UN. Under the operation's rules of engagement, NATO fighters were only authorized to shoot down helicopters that committed a hostile act. Otherwise, NATO fighters issued orders to "land or exit", in other words, land the aircraft or leave the no-fly zone. Typically, helicopters in Bosnian airspace complied with these orders by landing, but then took off again after NATO forces departed. None of the parties in the conflict respected the ban on helicopter flights, as evidenced when Ratko Mladić responded to a BBC journalist's question about his violation of the ban with the statement, "The commander of the Bosnian Serb armed forces does not ride on a donkey."

Deceptive markings on helicopters further complicated matters for NATO pilots. Many of the combatants painted their helicopters to look like those of organizations that the UN's Zagreb Flight Coordination Center had authorized to fly in restricted space. For example, the army of the Republika Srpska often painted a Red Cross logo on their helicopters, and Croatian helicopters were given markings similar to those of UN humanitarian aid helicopters. The questionable identity of these helicopters became particularly problematic after the Black Hawk Incident in Iraq, because NATO pilots became more reluctant to engage potential belligerents without clear identification. As a result of the rules of engagement and difficulties in aircraft identification, NATO forces proved unable to stop most unauthorized helicopter flights, resulting in a documented total of 5711 unauthorized flights during the conflict.

== Close air support and air strikes ==
Even before Operation Deny Flight began, a number of US officials lobbied for a large role for NATO air power in Bosnia. In particular, as part of Bill Clinton's platform during his 1992 campaign for President of the United States he promised a "lift and strike" policy, which included the use of air strikes against Bosnian Serb forces. After the commencement of Operation Deny Flight, US officials, including President Clinton, pushed for an expanded mission. After the Bosnian Serbs rejected the Vance-Owen Plan on 6 May 1993, Clinton and other US officials intensified these calls and they discussed the possibility of using large-scale strikes to coerce the Serbs into acceptance. Ultimately, no such strikes were approved or carried out, but American officials became more open to the idea of using air power for coercion.

In June 1993, partly in response to pressure from the United States, the Security Council passed Resolution 836 which authorized NATO forces to provide close air support for UNPROFOR forces upon request. The procedure to request air support was quite difficult, as it involved the "dual key" of both UN and NATO approval. UN approval required contact with the United Nations headquarters in New York City, making effective coordination nearly impossible given the difference in time zones. The UN approval process was later somewhat streamlined when UN Secretary-General Boutros Boutros-Ghali delegated the authority to authorize air strikes to his special representative in Bosnia, Yasushi Akashi. Even after this simplification, however, "dual key" remained a problem as all requests first had to be processed through the UN Air Operations Center in Kiseljak then pass up the entire UNPROFOR chain of command to Akashi. After Akashi approved the request, he would make a request to NATO commanders who then had to pass orders back down their chain of command and coordinate with forces on the ground.

Due to the difficult "dual key" authorization measure, NATO did not fulfill its close air support mission for several months. Nonetheless, NATO soon began further planning for a third mission: coercive air strikes as advocated by the United States. NATO first prepared to use Deny Flight to carry out air strikes in August 1993 as part of a plan to end the Siege of Sarajevo. After diplomatic intervention, the plan was not executed, but a precedent was established for the possible use of air strikes. Thus, in February 1994, after the Sarajevo Marketplace Bombing, NATO issued an ultimatum to the Serbs to withdraw all heavy weapons from an exclusion zone around Sarajevo or face bombing. The Bosnian Serbs complied with NATO demands and no strikes were carried out.

=== 1994 Serb Jastreb J-21 shootdown ===
On 28 February 1994, a NATO Airborne Early Warning aircraft flying over Hungary vectored two US F-16s to an area south of Banja Luka, where six J-21 Jastreb and two J-22 Orao were flying back to their base after bombing the "Bratstvo" military factory at Novi Travnik, in blatant violation of the non-fly zone. Four Serb Jastrebs were shot down and another crashed while trying to escape in low-level flight. This marked the first combat mission in NATO's history. Eight days later, on 8 March, a Spanish Air Force CASA C-212 transport plane was hit by a missile near the border between Croatia and the Republic of Krajina, while ferrying UNPROFOR personnel from Zagreb to Split. The crew managed to land the aircraft at Rijeka. The attack may have been a Bosnian Serb response to the 28 February shootdowns.

=== Attack on Goražde ===
In April 1994, Bosnian Serbs forces launched an attack on the UN Safe Area of Goražde. Initially, US Secretary of Defense William Perry told reporters that the United States would "not enter the war to stop" the Serbs from overrunning Goražde, and other senior officials publicly downplayed the possibility of using air strikes. Several days into the attack, however, a number of UNPROFOR soldiers were injured, and one was killed by Serb fire. Thus, General Michael Rose, the UNPROFOR Commander, requested NATO strikes under the mandate of UNSCR 836.

On 10 April, in response to the request, two US Air Force F-16s dropped 4 bombs on Serb targets, including a tank and a command post. The next day, two US Marine Corps F/A-18C aircraft strafed additional targets in the area. That same day, General Ratko Mladić, the commander of the Bosnian Serb army, called General Rose and threatened the safety of his forces, saying "one more attack and I will shoot down aircraft – cannot guarantee safety of UNPROFOR and will attack UNPROFOR and your headquarters". Making good on his threat, from 12 April to 14 April, Mladić ordered his forces to surround 150 UNPROFOR peacekeepers, effectively taking them hostage. Mladić then telephoned General Rose and told him "that if NATO did not stop its actions, not one UN soldier would leave alive". Some of the UNPROFOR hostages were from NATO member states, notably the United Kingdom and France, who pushed for an immediate end to the strikes out of fear for the safety of their personnel. In response to the British and French concerns, NATO temporarily recalled its forces, but on 15 April, in response to increased Serb attacks, aircraft were again deployed to the area.

As Mladić had promised, the Bosnian Serb army around Goražde attempted to shoot down NATO aircraft. On 15 April 1994, a French Dassault Étendard IV jet was hit by ground fire while conducting a reconnaissance mission in the area. The jet was damaged, but returned safely to its carrier, the Clemenceau. On 16 April, a British Sea Harrier from the carrier HMS Ark Royal was called in by UN forces to strike a tank. After making several unsuccessful passes at the target, the Sea Harrier was targeted by a Bosnian Serb shoulder-launched surface-to-air missile and was subsequently shot down. The pilot ejected and was successfully repatriated. After the Harrier shootdown, NATO did not carry out any further strikes around Goražde, and on 17 April, Mladić released most of the hostages he had taken. Over the next several days, the Serbs agreed to, and then broke, several ceasefires in the Goražde area. In an effort to secure Goražde and to force the Serbs to honor agreements, NATO and the UN issued an ultimatum for Bosnian Serb forces to cease their attacks and withdraw their forces or face additional air strikes on 22 April. The Serbs complied with the ultimatum, requiring a withdrawal of heavy weapons from a 20 kilometers (12 mi) zone and all forces from a 3 km (1.9 mi) zone. Because of the Serb compliance, NATO ceased its operations around Goražde.

=== Sarajevo ===
In February 1994 (when air strikes were originally threatened), NATO had created a heavy weapons exclusion zone around Sarajevo, and collected weapons at a number of sites. On 5 August, the VRS seized several weapons from the Illidža Weapons Collection site in clear violation of the exclusion zone agreement. During the seizure, Serb forces injured a Ukrainian UNPROFOR peacekeeper. In response to the attack, the UN once again requested NATO air support. Two U.S. A-10 aircraft repeatedly strafed Serb targets, and the Serbs returned the seized weapons to the collection site.

On 22 September, UNPROFOR again requested NATO air support in the Sarajevo area after Serb forces attacked a French armored personnel carrier. In response, two British SEPECAT Jaguar aircraft struck near a Serb tank, destroying it.

=== Attack on Bihać, bombing of Udbina and hostages ===
The location of Bihać within Bosnia and Herzegovina

In October and November 1994, during the Siege of Bihać, the Muslim-Croat Federation launched a large offensive around the town of Bihać, in far northwestern Bosnia. The Serbs soon launched a counterattack, and in support of their operations, launched air strikes with aircraft based at a former JNA military airport in Udbina, south of Bihać, located in the Serbian Krajina in Croatia. The Serb aircraft dropped napalm and cluster bombs. Although most of the ordnance came from old, unreliable stocks and failed to explode, the attacks were a clear violation of the no-fly zone, and a challenge to NATO. NATO immediately looked for ways to respond, but its forces were not permitted to carry out operations in Croatian airspace, and due to Bihać's proximity to the border, Serb aircraft could attack into Bosnia, then cross back into Croatia before being intercepted. As such, NATO was powerless to stop the incursions.

The location of Udbina within Croatia

In recognition of the situation, the Security Council passed Resolution 958, which allowed NATO aircraft to operate in Croatia. On 21 November, NATO acted under its new authority with a strike on the Udbina airfield. The strike, which involved 39 aircraft, was the largest combat operation in NATO's history up to that time; nonetheless, it was criticized as a "pinprick" that did little real damage to Serb capabilities, only temporarily disabling runways. NATO forces deliberately refrained from attacking Serb planes at the airfield, and only targeted runways and anti-aircraft capabilities. Following the Udbina strike, NATO continued to launch strikes in the area, and on 23 November, after a NATO reconnaissance plane was illuminated by the radar of a surface-to-air missile (SAM) system, NATO planes attacked SAM sites at Otoka and Dvor with AGM-88 HARM anti-radiation missiles. The Serbs reacted to these strikes by immediately seizing 250 UNPROFOR hostages, and a total of 500 by early December. While the hostages were treated fairly well, some were used as human shields, including three who were forced to lie on the tarmac at the Bosnian Serb airbase in Banja Luka.

After the strikes at Otoka and Dvor, Bosnian Serb forces continued to target NATO aircraft with surface-to-air missiles, while advancing against the Bihać enclave. On 24 November, Serb forces fired radar-guided missiles at two British Tornado F3 aircraft. The next day, Serb forces fired on two NATO F-16s. In response to this growing SAM threat, and the UNPROFOR hostages, NATO suspended flights in Bosnian airspace on 2 December.

Shortly after the suspension of NATO flights, former US President Jimmy Carter personally negotiated a four-month ceasefire in Bosnia. Although there were some violations of this ceasefire, most of the parties in the conflict heeded it. NATO ordered its planes back in the air, but due to the diminished hostilities, they did not engage in any significant operations for the next several months. On 17 December, however, another French Navy Super Etendard was hit by a missile over Bosnia while on a recce mission, and had to perform an emergency landing on an airbase in Italy. Nonetheless, the reduced tensions resulting from the Carter ceasefire and the cessation of NATO active air operations led to the release of most of the UNPROFOR hostages over the next several weeks.

== Expansion of the air campaign in 1995 ==
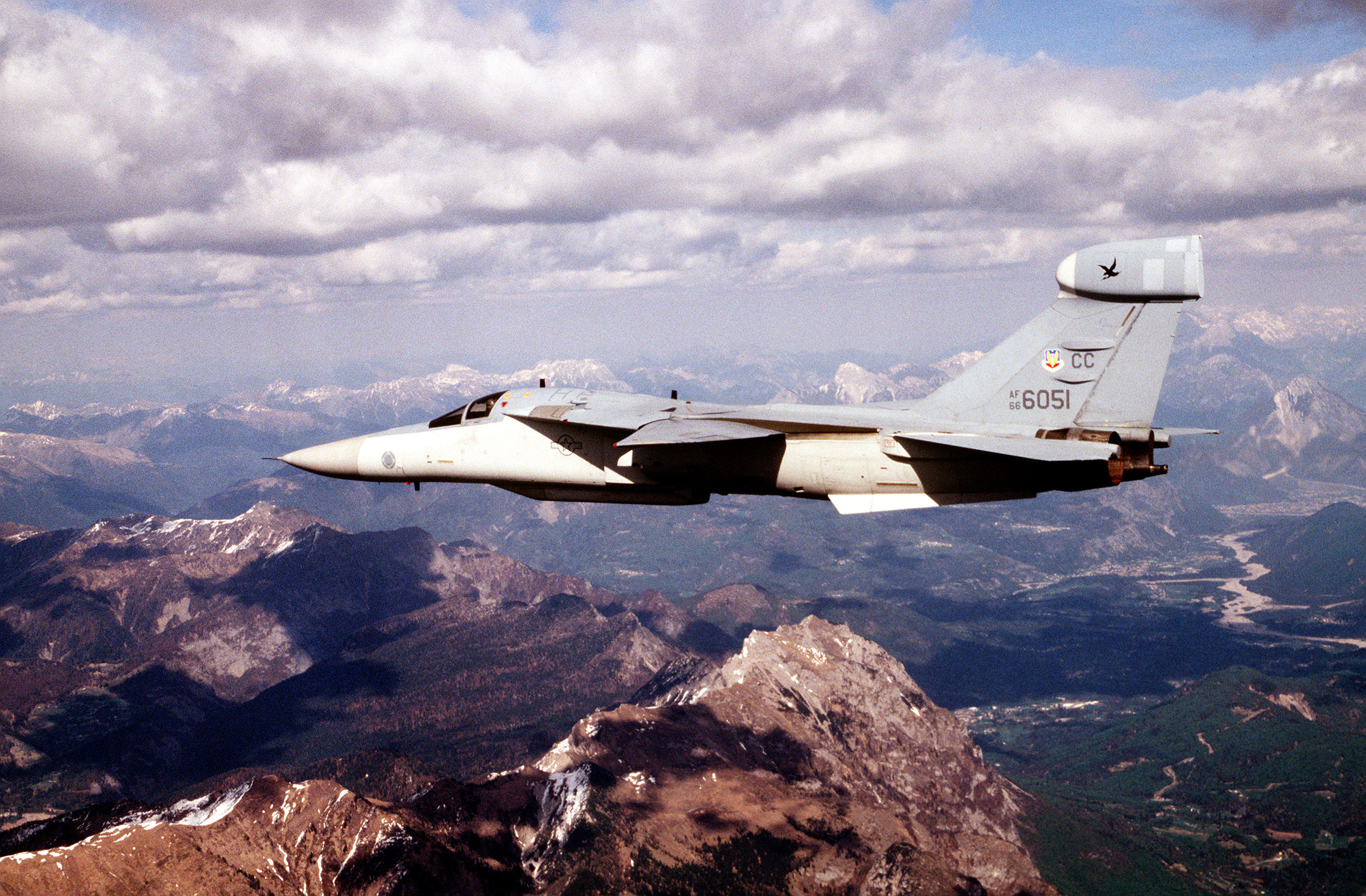
An EF-111 flying over the Alps in support of Deny Flight in May 1995

Although 1994 ended peacefully with the Carter ceasefire, NATO continued planning for new operations. Both NATO and UN officials believed that after the ceasefire expired in March, the fighting would resume. As such, planners at the Balkans Combined Air Operations Center (CAOC) began drawing up plans for new air operations. By late December, the planners developed a plan called "Dead Eye", designed to eliminate Serb SAM capabilities, so that NATO could regain uncontested air superiority. Over the next several months, the planning for "Dead Eye" gradually evolved into the plan for Operation Deliberate Force, a massive bombing of Serb targets that was eventually executed in August and September 1995.

=== Bombing of Pale and the hostage crisis ===
While NATO was planning its new strategy, the ceasefire expired, and, as predicted, fighting resumed. As the fighting gradually widened, Bosnian Muslim forces launched a large-scale offensive in the area of Sarajevo. In response to the attack, the Bosnian Serbs seized heavy weapons from a UN-guarded depot, and began shelling targets. As a retaliation for these actions, the UN commander, Lt. General Rupert Smith requested NATO air strikes. NATO honored the request on 25 and 26 May 1995 by bombing a Serb ammunition dump at Pale. The mission was carried out by USAF F-16s and Spanish Air Force EF-18As Hornet armed with laser-guided bombs. The Serbs then seized 377 UNPROFOR hostages and used them as human shields for a variety of targets in Bosnia, forcing NATO to end its strikes.

Facing a second hostage crisis, General Smith and other top UN commanders began shifting strategies. The UN began to redeploy its forces to more defensible locations, so that they would be harder to attack or take hostage. More importantly, Gen. Rose established the UN Rapid Reaction Force, a heavily armed unit with more aggressive rules of engagement, designed to take offensive action if necessary to prevent hostage-taking and enforce peace agreements.

=== Mrkonjić Grad incident ===
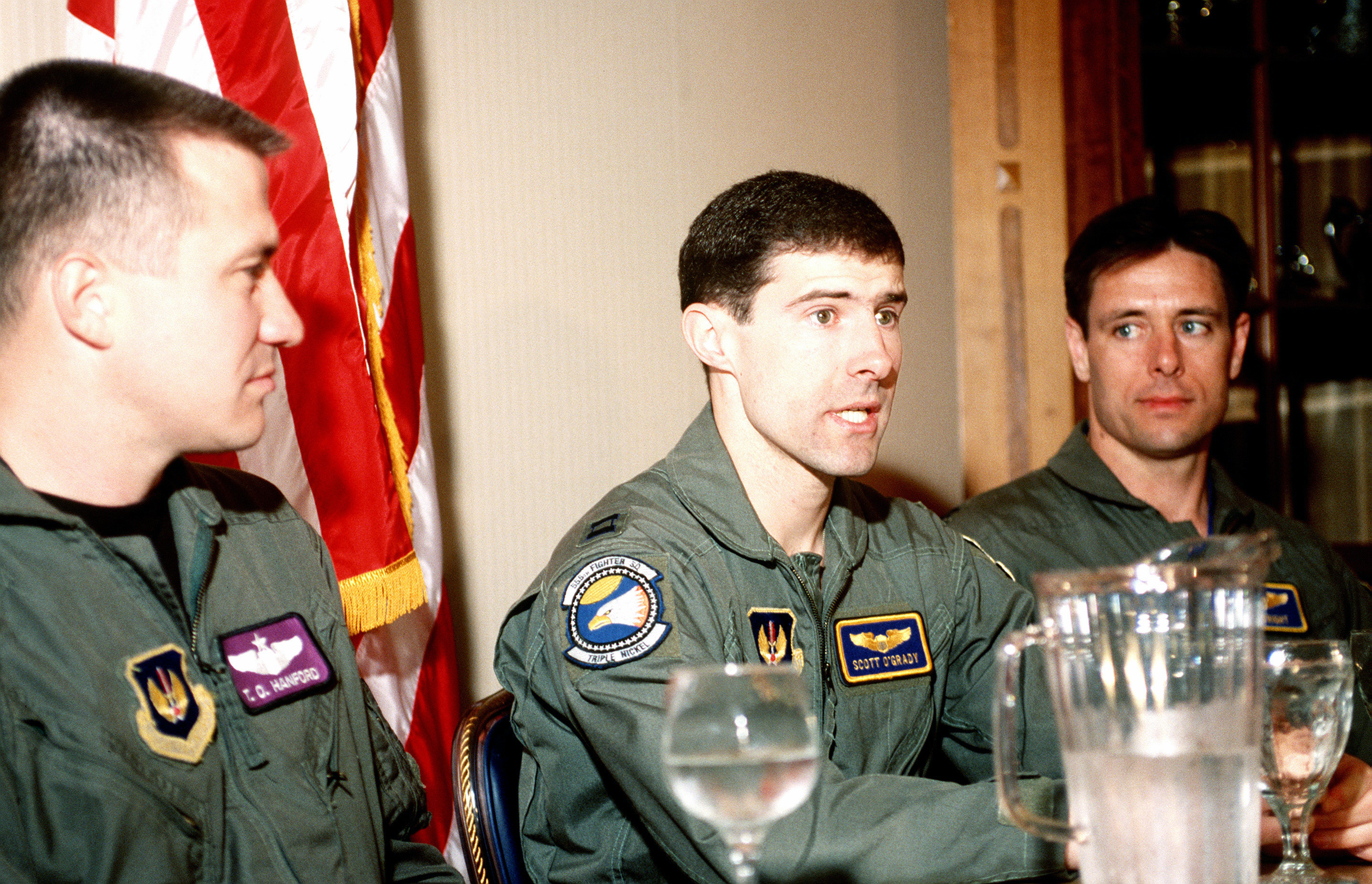
Captains T.O. Hantford, Scott O'Grady, and Bob Wright at a press conference after O'Grady's rescue

After the seizure of the 377 UNPROFOR hostages, NATO did not carry out further air strikes, but it did continue regular air patrol operations in support of the no-fly zone. On 2 June 1995, Captain Scott O'Grady of the United States Air Force was sent on a routine no-fly zone patrol in his F-16. While on patrol, O'Grady's F-16 was shot down by a Serb SA-6 surface-to-air missile system near Mrkonjić Grad. O'Grady ejected safely, but found himself trapped in Serb-controlled territory. According to many US officials, he may have been deliberately targeted so that the Serbs could take an American hostage.

After O'Grady was shot down, tensions increased greatly between NATO and the Bosnian Serbs. A number of US commanders called for immediate retaliatory air strikes; however, the Serbs still held the majority of the hostages seized after the bombing of Pale. The threat to the hostages prevented NATO from acting more forcefully, and the Serbs released 121 hostages immediately after the incident in an effort to cool tensions. Nonetheless, the situation remained explosive for the next six days until O'Grady was rescued on 8 June by the 3rd Battalion 8th Marines 2nd Marine Division, ending the calls for immediate offensive action. Shortly thereafter, the Serbs released the remaining hostages. As a result of the incident, NATO ordered that all further sorties be accompanied by aircraft designed for suppression of enemy air defenses (SEAD).

On 11 August, a USAF MQ-1 Predator UAV was shot down by Serb antiaircraft fire over Krepšić, near Brčko, while another was lost to mechanical failure on 14 August.

=== Response to Srebrenica ===
A month after the O'Grady incident, on 6 July, the VRS launched an offensive against the UN safe-area of Srebrenica. Dutch peacekeepers in the area considered calling for NATO air strikes in response to the attack, but they decided against them because the Serbs were not using heavy weapons, and out of fear of another hostage crisis. On 10 July, as the fighting intensified, the Dutch troops finally requested close air support from NATO, but due to communication problems in the "dual key" system, the request was not authorized until the next day.

On 11 July, NATO prepared for a large-scale mission in Srebrenica involving 60 aircraft. At 2:30 PM, the first wave of the assault, two Dutch F-16s, bombed two Serb tanks on the outskirts of the town. Two USAF F-16s were dispatched next to attack an artillery piece, but they failed to find their target. Soon thereafter, Bosnian Serb troops seized several Dutch peacekeepers as hostages and threatened to kill them if NATO did not call off its attacks. The Dutch commander reported this back to his government, and Dutch Defense Minister Joris Voorhoeve immediately telephoned the NATO operations center and ordered an end to the attacks.

By the end of the day, Srebrenica had fallen to Bosnian Serb forces, who began a brutal campaign of ethnic cleansing that left roughly 8,000 men dead. In the wake of this tragedy, many observers blamed NATO for failing to use its airpower more forcefully. David Rohde, a journalist, later wrote that "if NATO close air support had been used earlier ... the 7,079 missing might still be alive today". This feeling that NATO could have prevented thousands of deaths by acting more strongly led to increased planning for Operation Deliberate Force.

=== The London Conference ===
After the events at Srebrenica, sixteen nations met at the London Conference, which began on 21 July 1995, to consider new options for Bosnia. As a result of the conference, UN Secretary-General Boutros Boutros-Ghali gave General Bernard Janvier, the UN military commander, the authority to request NATO airstrikes without consulting civilian UN officials. The North Atlantic Council, NATO's top political body, and the UN also agreed to use NATO air strikes in response to attacks on any of the other safe areas in Bosnia. The participants at the conference also agreed in principle to the use of large-scale NATO air strikes in response to future acts of Serb aggression.

== Operation Deliberate Force ==
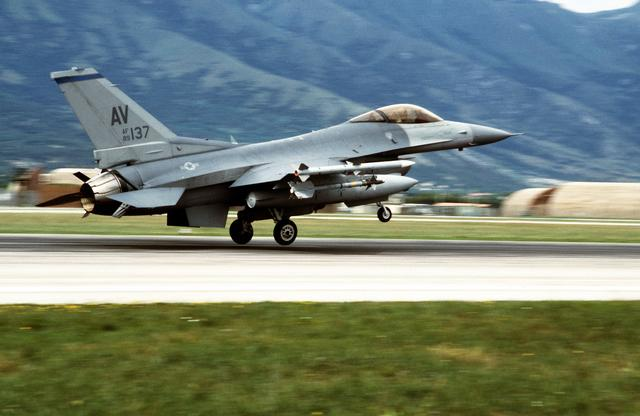
A US Air Force F-16C Fighting Falcon lands during Operation Deliberate Force

On 28 August 1995, a mortar shell slammed into a Sarajevo marketplace, killing 37 people. The United States subsequently blamed Bosnian Serb forces for the attack. Admiral Leighton Smith, the NATO commander, recommended that NATO launch retaliatory air strikes against the Serbs under the plan established for Operation Deliberate Force. On 30 August 1995, NATO officially launched Operation Deliberate Force with large-scale bombing of Serb targets. This bombing superseded Operation Deny Flight's role for air strikes and close air support, but Deny Flight remained an active operation, still enforcing the no-fly zone over Bosnia.

Until 20 September 1995, when Operation Deliberate Force ended, the role played by Deny Flight was minimal. After the suspension of Operation Deliberate Force; however, several further operations were carried out under Deny Flight. On 4 October 1995, Deny Flight aircraft fired HARM missiles after being targeted by surface-to-air missiles. On 8 October 1995, the UN requested close air support near Tuzla. Due to bad weather conditions, NATO aircraft were unable to locate their targets, but on 9 October, in the final combat engagement of Deny Flight, NATO aircraft returned and destroyed a Serb command and control bunker in the same area.

== Termination of Deny Flight ==
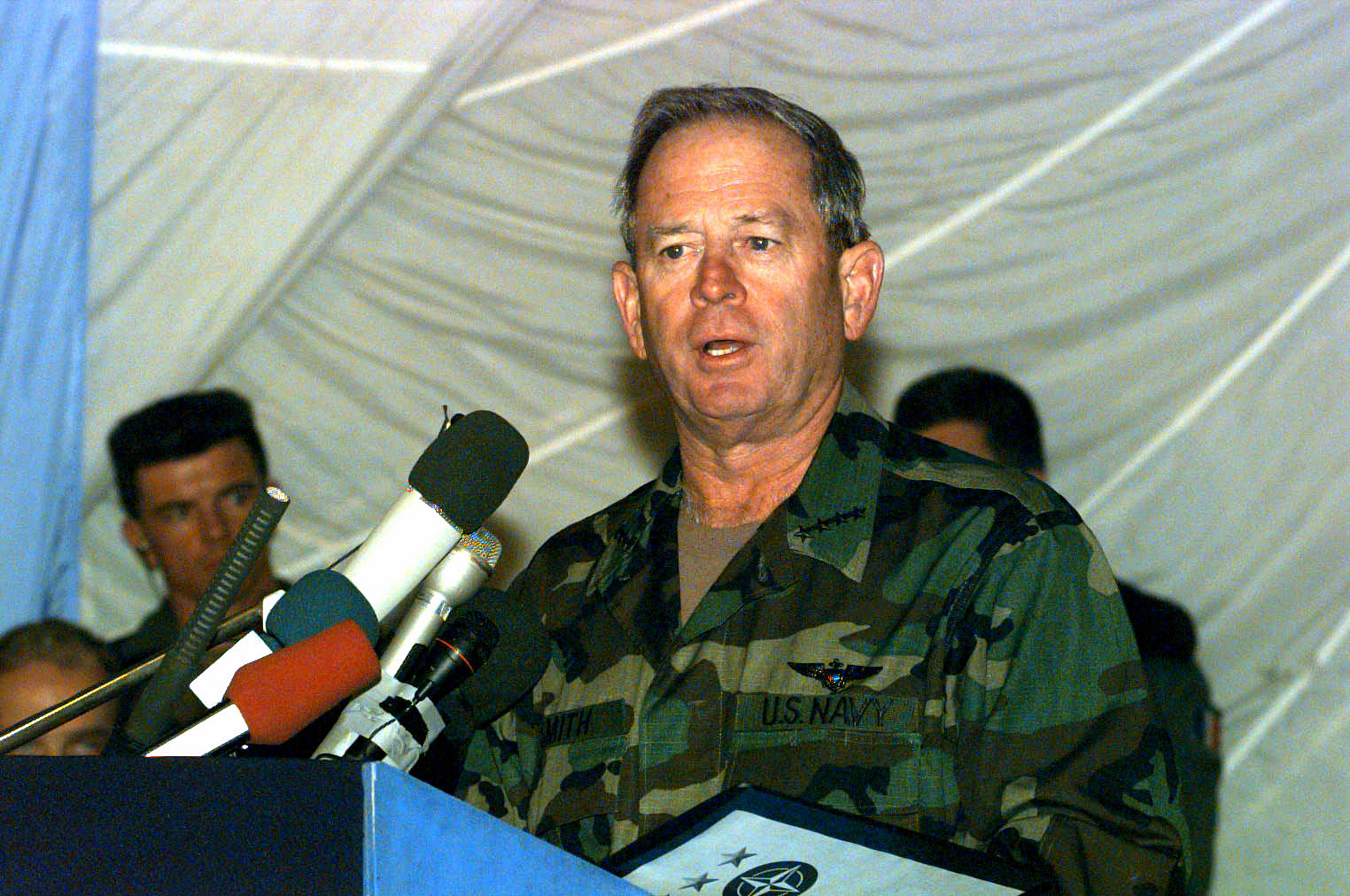
Adm. Leighton Smith speaks at the ceremony transferring authority to IFOR.

After the adoption of the Dayton Accords, a peace agreement for Bosnia, Deny Flight's mission was no longer necessary. On 15 December 1995, the United Nations Security Council officially terminated the resolutions that had authorized the operation, and on 16 December, the North Atlantic Council agreed to terminate Operation Deny Flight, effective 20 December. On 21 December 1995, NATO held a formal closure ceremony for Deny Flight in Vicenza. Many of the forces assigned to Deny Flight were transferred to Operation Decisive Endeavor, to provide support for new IFOR peacekeepers in Bosnia.

== Structure of forces ==
Throughout the course of its operation, Deny Flight was directed by Allied Forces Southern Europe (AFSOUTH) in Naples, under the command of the Commander-in-Chief of Allied Forces Southern Europe. At the beginning of the operation, Admiral Jeremy Boorda served as the commanding officer; he was replaced by Admiral Leighton W. Smith in 1994. Smith and Boorda, however, delegated day to day authority to Allied Air Forces Southern Europe (AIRSOUTH) commanded by Lieutenant General Joseph W. Ashy (until 1994) and then Lieutenant General Michael E. Ryan. While AIRSOUTH maintained day to day command, "mission tasking and operational control" were delegated to the commander of the NATO 5th Allied Tactical Air Force (5ATAF), initially Lt Gen Antonio Rosetti and later Lt Gen Andrea Fornaserio, both of the Italian Air Force.

To simplify the chain of command and coordinate activities, NATO established the Combined Air Operations Center (CAOC) in Vicenza, Italy, which assumed practical day-to-day control of Deny Flight and reported to the commander of the 5ATAF. Each squadron participating in the operation sent a liaison officer to the CAOC to ensure coordination. The initial director of the CAOC was Lt Gen James Chambers of the US Air Force. In November 1994, Major General Hal Hornburg replaced him. In practice, most tactical level decisions about Deny Flight were made by the director of the CAOC, and he had the authority to order NATO pilots to engage violators of the no-fly zone.

Twelve NATO countries provided forces to Operation Deny Flight: Belgium, Canada, Denmark, France, Germany, Italy, the Netherlands, Norway, Spain, Turkey, the United Kingdom and the United States. Together, these twelve states contributed a total of 4,500 personnel who were based at air bases in five countries: France, Germany, Greece, Italy, and the United Kingdom and on aircraft carriers in the region. Eight of the participating countries contributed a total of 239 aircraft to the operation, of which nearly half, 108, came from the United States. Within the United States, the US Navy and US Marine Corps provided the most support for the operation, and together they flew 70% of all of the air defense sorties flown during Deny Flight. American aircraft also provided the majority of the airstrikes during the conflict; of the 1,150 bombs dropped by NATO forces, 88% came from American aircraft.

== Impact and legacy ==
Operation Deny Flight lasted for 983 days and included 100,420 sorties carried out by 4,500 personnel from 12 NATO countries. It included the first combat engagement in NATO history, the Banja Luka incident, and many of NATO's first out of area operations. As such, Deny Flight "represented a momentous act, if only in symbolic terms, in that the alliance assumed a combat mission in a nondefensive capacity and out-of-area". Beyond this symbolic effect, Deny Flight had important consequences for NATO military policy, international relations, and the war in Bosnia.

=== Effect on military policy ===
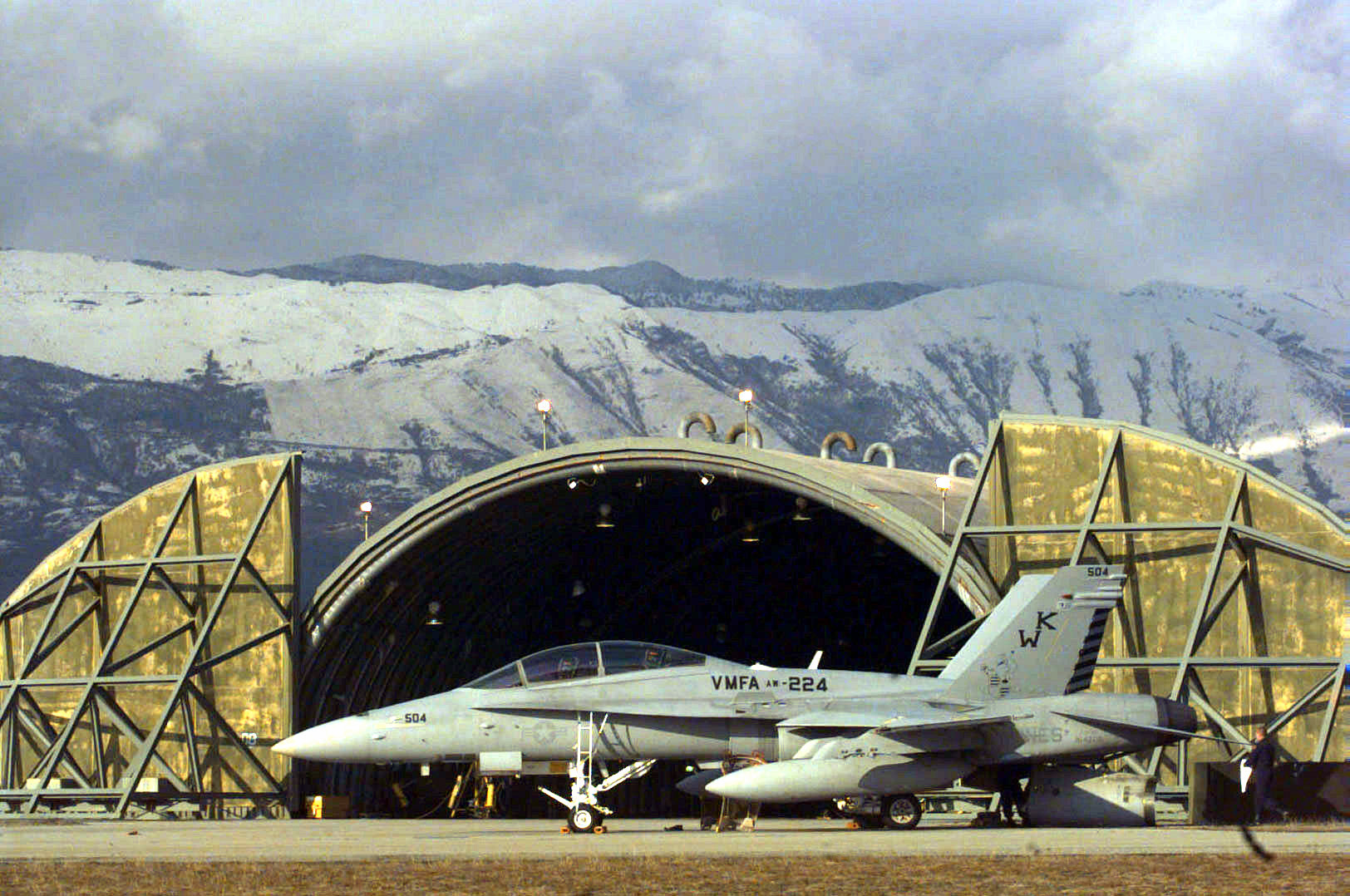
A US Marine Corps F/A-18 prepares for a mission in Bosnia in December 1995.

As one of the first major combat tests of NATO airforces, Deny Flight provided several important military lessons. Most importantly, Deny Flight helped to prove the effectiveness, or drive the development of several technologies. For example, during the operation, the F/A-18D Hornet was proven to be a "highly resourceful multirole platform" for the United States Marine Corps. Deny Flight was also important in the move towards precision-guided munitions, as nearly 70% of the munitions dropped by NATO during the conflict were precision-guided, versus only 8% during the Gulf War. For the Royal Navy, Deny Flight led to a re-evaluation of the Sea Harrier and a number of upgrades to it. In particular, the Royal Navy added the Paveway II laser-guided bomb to the Harrier, giving it a precision capability, and upgraded electronics aboard the aircraft in response to the necessities of combat in Bosnia. The lessons of Bosnia also led the Royal Air Force to deploy the Harrier GR7 aboard Royal Navy carriers for future operations in order to deliver more offensive force projection capability.

The four NATO aircraft shot down during Operation Deny Flight also forced NATO members to consider new defensive measures for their aircraft, including increased stealth capabilities. Deny Flight also demonstrated the necessity of better communications and integration among forces operating together, and led to some calls for technical training of UN personnel to work with NATO military systems. Finally, the rules of engagement established under Deny Flight also played an important role in shaping the rules of engagement for later NATO operations other than war, including Operation Joint Endeavor, and even NATO operations in Afghanistan.

=== Effect on the Atlantic relationship ===
Operation Deny Flight, and other NATO operations during the Bosnian War, resulted in significant tension within NATO and the Atlantic relationship. Deny Flight and other early operations "forced the Allies to consider the question of NATO's military responsibility for territory outside of its traditional defense perimeter, and it was one over which they were deeply divided". Disagreements between the United States and its European allies over when and how to use air power "made intra-alliance diplomacy more problematic" during the period. Many of these problems in the relationship were the result of concerns from European nations who had forces on the ground in UNPROFOR that might be taken hostage. The fact that the United States pushed for air strikes without placing its own forces on the ground in Bosnia greatly exacerbated this problem.

Deny Flight also helped set the path for future UN-NATO relations. Throughout the operation, NATO "felt the frustration of having its wings clipped by a parallel UN authority", while United Nations officials worried about the effect that NATO air strikes would have on the perceived neutrality of the United Nations. Frustration with the "dual key" procedure of authorization for NATO action also led NATO officers to reject such an arrangement in the future. Admiral Leighton Smith, the commander of NATO's forces during Deny Flight, expressed this sentiment quite bluntly, saying "Don't ever have another dual key." These difficulties in negotiating the UN-NATO relationship during Deny Flight were a major factor in the decision to place later NATO forces in the Balkans under the sole control of the NATO chain of command. While many of these effects on UN-NATO relations were negative, Deny Flight also had positive implications. During the operation, NATO and the UN exchanged liaison officers for the first time in their respective histories, establishing a precedent for military cooperation between the two. The communication and coordination failures during Deny Flight also instilled "a desire for mutual understanding and common solutions" between the two organizations. This desire for cooperation was crucial to the establishment of IFOR, and later UN-NATO cooperation in Bosnia and elsewhere.

=== Effect on the Bosnian War ===
Deny Flight also played a significant role in shaping the war in Bosnia, although its exact impact is debated. While Richard Holbrooke, the American special envoy for Bosnia, recognized Operation Deliberate Force as "a historic development in post-Cold War relations" and as a crucial element in ending the war in Bosnia, the actual impact of Deny Flight on the course of the conflict was more muted. None of the air strikes in Deny Flight were on the scale of those in Deliberate Force, and they did not significantly change the balance of power. Notably, however, Deny Flight was successful in that it "neutralised the Serbs' advantage in fixed-wing air-power". Deny Flight also paved the way for Operation Deliberate Force. According to Robert E. Hunter, then the US Ambassador to NATO, Deny Flight was crucial to the process of building "consensus support for increasingly robust use of airpower over Bosnia", which eventually culminated in Operation Deliberate Force.

While the material impact of Deny Flight was minimal, it did have a significant political impact. From the very beginning, according to Michael Beale, "the operation's implied objective was to demonstrate UN and NATO determination to stabilize the situation in Bosnia so that a peaceful settlement could be achieved". Given the many violations of Deny Flight by helicopters, and the frequent failure of coordination between NATO and the UN, it is uncertain whether Deny Flight accomplished this mission. Nonetheless, NATO's limited air strikes under Deny Flight "demonstrated its determination to protect United Nations personnel" and Bosnian civilians, according to Michael R. Gordon, chief military correspondent for The New York Times. This determination eventually held the key to peace.

== See also ==
- 1999 NATO bombing of Yugoslavia
- Operation Deliberate Force
