= United Nations Security Council Resolution 816 =

March 1993 United Nations resolution

UN Security Council Resolution 816
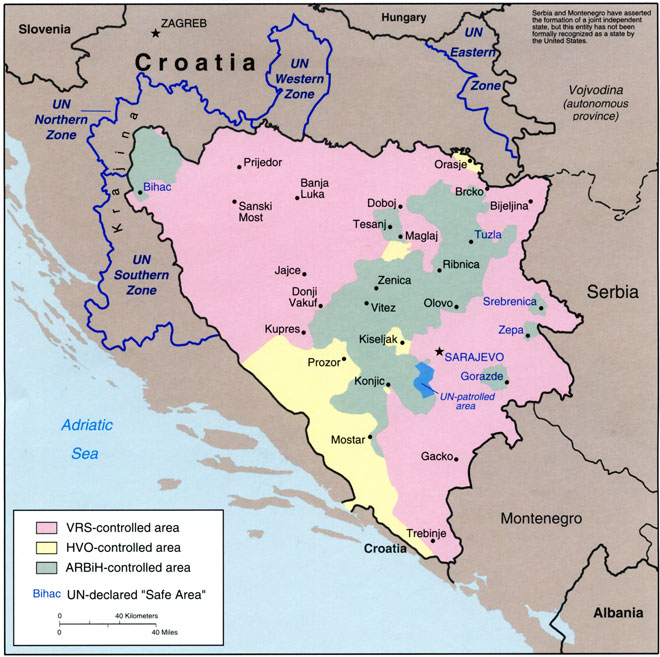
- Areas of control in Bosnia and Herzegovina (1994)
- Date: 31 March 1993
- Meeting no.: 3,191
- Code: S/RES/816 (Document)
- Subject: Bosnia and Herzegovina
- Voting summary: 14 voted for; None voted against; 1 abstained
- Result: Adopted

Security Council composition
- Permanent members: China; France; Russia; United Kingdom; United States
- Non-permanent members: Brazil; Cape Verde; Djibouti; Hungary; Japan; Morocco; New Zealand; Pakistan; Spain; Venezuela

United Nations Security Council resolution 816, adopted on 31 March 1993, after reaffirming resolutions 781 (1992), 786 (1992) concerning a ban on military flights over Bosnia and Herzegovina and recognising the current situation in the region, the council, acting under Chapter VII of the United Nations Charter, extended the ban to cover flights by all fixed-wing and rotary-wing aircraft over the country, and to use all measures necessary to ensure compliance with the ban.

The council went on to note that this ban did not apply to flights destined for use by the United Nations Protection Force (UNPROFOR) or for humanitarian reasons. It also requested UNPROFOR to continue to monitor compliance with the ban on flights over Bosnia and Herzegovina, calling on all parties to co-operate with UNPROFOR in the monitoring process.

Addressing member states, the council authorised that after seven days following the adoption of Resolution 816, they should all ensure compliance with this resolution. It also urged member states to co-operate with UNPROFOR with measures they have taken to implement the current resolution and rules of engagement, and in the event of the co-chairmen of the Steering Committee of the International Conference on the Former Yugoslavia notifying the council that all the Bosnian parties have accepted their proposals on a settlement, the measures set forth in the present resolution will be subsumed into the measures for implementing that settlement.

The resolution concluded by asking the Secretary-General Boutros Boutros-Ghali to report back to the council on the actions taken by member states to enforce the current resolution.

Resolution 816 was adopted by 14 votes to none, with one abstention from China, due to its reservations about the authorisation of the use of force.

Based upon Resolution 816, NATO began Operation Deny Flight on 12 April 1993 to enforce the no-fly zone.

== See also ==
- Breakup of Yugoslavia
- Bosnian War
- Croatian War of Independence
- List of United Nations Security Council Resolutions 801 to 900 (1993–1994)
- Yugoslav Wars
