= Operation Maritime Monitor =

1992 NATO operation in Bosnia

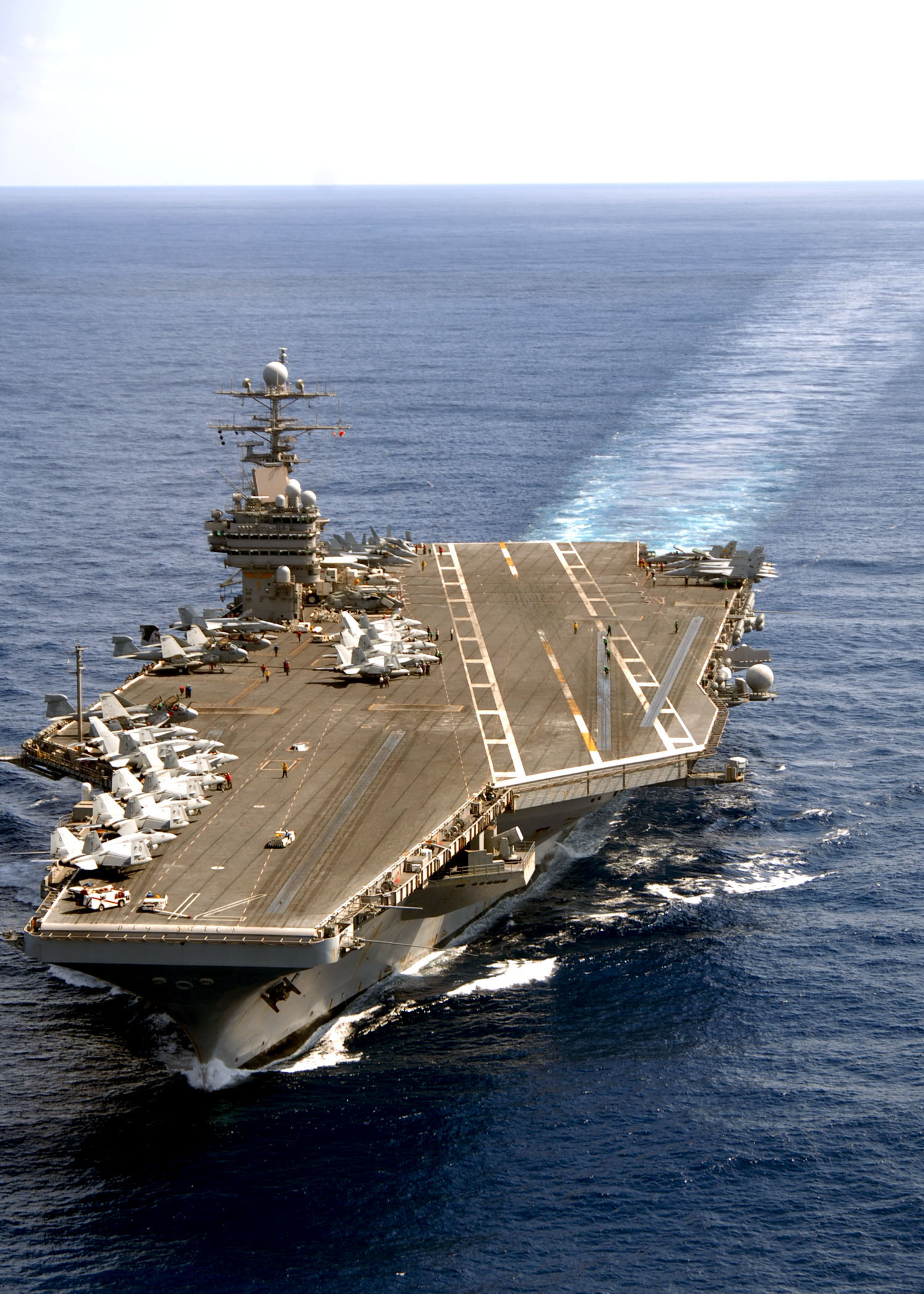
USS Theodore Roosevelt

Operation Maritime Monitor was a NATO operation during the Bosnian War to monitor compliance with sanctions imposed against the former Yugoslavia under United Nations Security Council resolutions 713 (1991) and 757 (1992). The operation began on July 16, 1992 and ran until November 22, 1992. Under Maritime Monitor, NATO ships from STANAVFORMED and STANAVFORLANT, NATO's standing naval force in the Mediterranean and Atlantic, patrolled in international waters off the coast of Montenegro. While NATO forces patrolled off the Montenegrin coast, the Western European Union ran a parallel operation, code-named Operation Sharp Vigilance in the Otranto Strait. Maritime Monitor was terminated on November 22, 1992 and replaced by the more aggressive Operation Maritime Guard.

== See also ==
- Yugoslav Wars
