= United Nations Security Council Resolution 781 =

October 1992 resolution establishing a no-fly zone in Bosnia and Herzegovina

UN Security Council Resolution 781
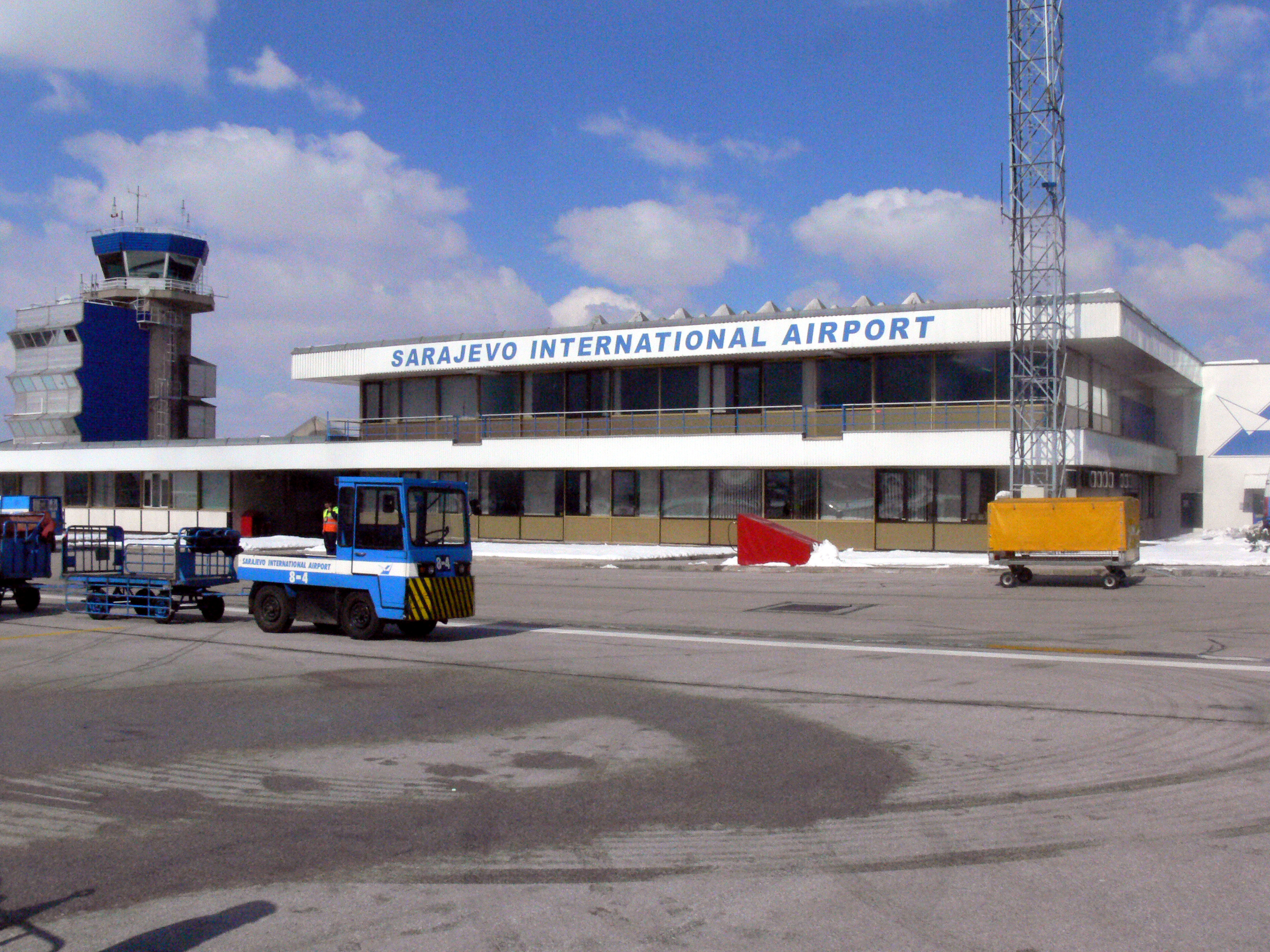
- Sarajevo International Airport
- Date: 9 October 1992
- Meeting no.: 3,122
- Code: S/RES/781 (Document)
- Subject: Bosnia and Herzegovina
- Voting summary: 14 voted for; None voted against; 1 abstained
- Result: Adopted

Security Council composition
- Permanent members: China; France; Russia; United Kingdom; United States
- Non-permanent members: Austria; Belgium; Cape Verde; Ecuador; Hungary; India; Japan; Morocco; Venezuela; Zimbabwe

United Nations Security Council Resolution 781 was adopted on 9 October 1992. After reaffirming Resolution 713 (1991) and all the subsequent resolutions on the situation in the former Yugoslavia, the Council decided to impose a ban on military flights in the airspace over Bosnia and Herzegovina, acting in accordance with the provisions set out in Resolution 770 (1992).

The Council noted that the ban did not apply on flights relating to the United Nations Protection Force (UNPROFOR) or other United Nations operations and humanitarian aid flights. It requested UNPROFOR to monitor compliance with the ban, including the possibility of placing observers at airfields in the territory of the former Yugoslavia, and ensuring that the purpose of the flights to Bosnia and Herzegovina is consistent with Security Council Resolutions.

The resolution then called on Member States to take all measures necessary to assist the Protection Force based on technical monitoring and other capabilities. It also requested the Secretary-General Boutros Boutros-Ghali to report to the Security Council on a periodic basis on the implementation of the current resolution and any violations of it. The Council then stated it would undertake to examine the information regarding the implementation of Resolution 781 and any such violations, including the prospect of introducing further measures to enforce the ban. The current resolution only stated that "regional agencies" could monitor the ban, however Resolution 816 (1993) authorised NATO forces to shoot down violators. There were several violations of the ban, particularly by Bosnian Serb air force against military and civilian targets in Muslim enclaves.

Resolution 781 was adopted by 14 votes to none against, with one abstention from China, in protest at the text in the resolution hinting that force may be used if the ban was not enforced.

== See also ==
- Breakup of Yugoslavia
- Bosnian War
- List of United Nations Security Council Resolutions 701 to 800 (1991–1993)
- Yugoslav Wars
