= May 1995 Pale air strikes =

NATO air strikes on Army of Republika Srpska

- Part of Operation Deny Flight
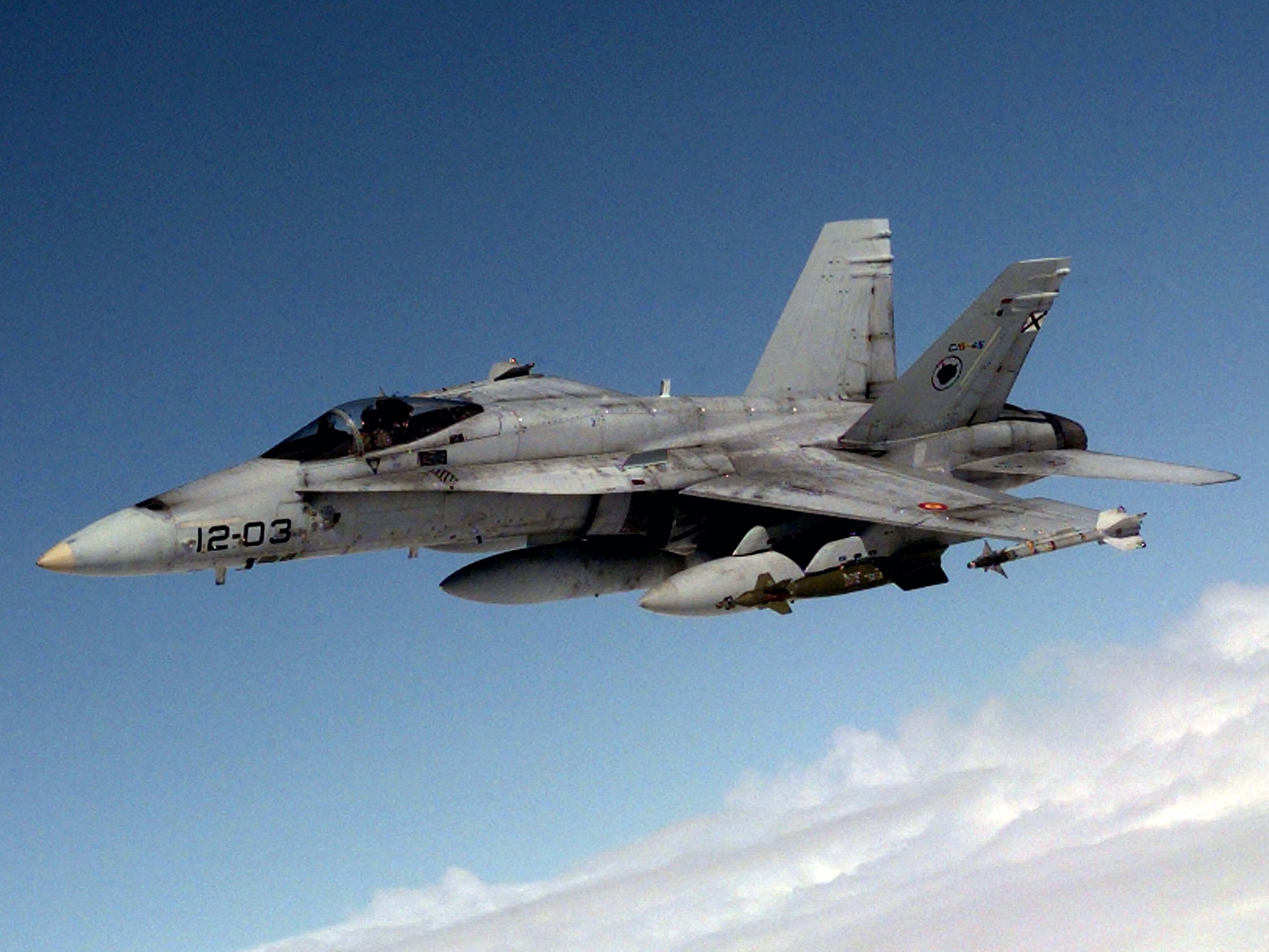
- Spanish EF-18
Date	25–26 May 1995
Location	Pale, Bosnia and Herzegovina 43°47′12″N 18°36′55″E
Result	VRS ammunition depots destroyed or damaged

Belligerents
NATO; United States; Spain; Netherlands; France	Republika Srpska

Commanders and leaders
(NATO) Leighton W. Smith (United Nations) Rupert Smith	

Units involved
(NATO) 5th Allied Tactical Air Force	(Republika Srpska) Sarajevo-Romanija Corps

Casualties and losses
None	4 dead 17 wounded 8 ammunition depots hit

On 25 and 26 May 1995, the North Atlantic Treaty Organisation (NATO) conducted air strikes against ammunition depots of the Army of Republika Srpska (VRS) at Jahorinski Potok near Pale, Bosnia and Herzegovina, as part of Operation Deny Flight, during the Bosnian War.

Operation Deny Flight conducted aerial monitoring and enforced compliance with a no-fly zone, provided close air support to United Nations (UN) peacekeeping forces mandated by the United Nations Security Council, and conducted, after request by and in coordination with the UN, approved air strikes against designated targets threatening the security of the UN-declared safe areas. NATO Allied Forces Southern Europe was responsible for the operation, and day-to-day mission tasking was conducted by 5th Allied Tactical Air Force in Italy. On two occasions in 1994, NATO airstrikes had resulted in the VRS taking UN peacekeepers hostage and using them as human shields. In response to offensives by the Army of the Republic of Bosnia and Herzegovina in March 1995, the VRS removed heavy weapons from UN collection points in May and used them to shell the besieged Bosnian capital and UN-declared safe area of Sarajevo.

In response the UN commander requested a NATO airstrike against VRS ammunition depots just outside Pale. The first strike on 25 May hit two depots. The VRS responded later that day by shelling five of the safe areas in Bosnia, including the city of Tuzla. During the latter attack, a shell landed near a crowded cafe, killing 71 civilians and wounding about 150, and horrifying the international community. A second air strike was carried out against six more depots in the same location the following morning. This prompted the VRS to take 377 UN peacekeepers hostage over the following days, and a decision to cease conducting air strikes against the VRS for the time being. The UN was forced to reassess its strategy, deployments and force structure, leading to the consolidation of UN peacekeepers into defensible bases, withdrawal of vulnerable military observers from VRS-held areas, and the deployment of a new force element, the two-brigade UN Rapid Reaction Force (RRF). All of this was part of the UN's new aggressive approach to defend threatened peacekeepers and retaliate for violations of UN resolutions. The RRF played a significant role in defending UN troops and retaliating for VRS provocations when the use of NATO air strikes returned with a vengeance during the Operation Deliberate Force air campaign which began in August. The Bosnian Serb leaders responsible for the Tuzla massacre and hostage taking were prosecuted and sentenced to long terms of imprisonment after the war.

== Background ==
Operation Deny Flight was a North Atlantic Treaty Organisation operation in the airspace over Bosnia and Herzegovina which conducted aerial monitoring and enforced compliance with a no-fly zone, provided close air support to United Nations (UN) peacekeeping forces mandated by the United Nations Security Council, and conducted, "after request by and in coordination with the UN, approved air strikes against designated targets threatening the security of the UN-declared safe areas." It commenced operation on 12 April 1993, and its implementation was the responsibility of NATO Allied Forces Southern Europe (AFSOUTH) headquartered in Naples, Italy. Control of Operation Deny Flight was delegated to the Commander of Allied Air Forces Southern Europe (COMAIRSOUTH), and operational control of day-to-day activities was delegated to the Commander, 5th Allied Tactical Air Force (5th ATAF), headquartered at Vicenza, Italy. Coordination between 5th ATAF and the UN was achieved through the exchange of liaison officers. NATO first carried out a close air support mission as part of Operation Deny Flight on 10 April 1994. At this time, the Bosnian Serb Army (VRS) was on the verge of overrunning the UN safe area of Goražde about 75 km (47 mi) south east of the Bosnian capital Sarajevo. A second air strike was carried out the following day, and while the VRS temporarily ordered a halt to their advance, its commander, General Ratko Mladić, ordered his troops to detain and hold hostage 150 UN peacekeepers for a protracted period while negotiations were concluded. This pattern was repeated in November 1994 when NATO air strikes were used against the VRS in defence of the UN safe area of Bihać and the VRS took 400 UN peacekeepers hostage and used them as human shields at weapons collection points around besieged Sarajevo and at the Bosnian Serb airstrip in Banja Luka in western Bosnia. While they, like the earlier hostages, were progressively released, the vulnerability of the UN peacekeepers and the limitations of air strikes against the VRS given their propensity for hostage taking were well established by the time the 1994/1995 winter ceasefire took effect.

In early 1995, Commander-in-Chief AFSOUTH – ultimately responsible for Operation Deny Flight – was United States Navy Admiral Leighton W. Smith Jr. On 20 March 1995, the Army of the Republic of Bosnia and Herzegovina (ARBiH) broke the winter ceasefire with offensives around Mount Vlašić and Mount Stolice, which were 100 km (62 mi) north west and 130 km (81 mi) north east of Sarajevo respectively. In response, the VRS removed heavy weapons from UN weapon collection points, in violation of prior agreements. The VRS also began harassing UN relief flights into Sarajevo. On 8 April, while approaching Sarajevo airport, a United States Lockheed C-130 Hercules transport aircraft was hit by machine gun fire. While the aircraft landed and took off safely, the UN closed down the airlift in response. By way of a threat to the VRS, NATO aircraft overflew Sarajevo, but no air strikes were conducted. The implied threat had no obvious effect on VRS violations.

Fighting intensified around Sarajevo in early May when VRS troops overran heavy weapon collection points and mortared the city, killing ten Bosnian Muslims and wounding thirty. In response, the recently appointed commander of the United Nations Protection Force (UNPROFOR), British Lieutenant General Rupert Smith, called for air strikes but was initially rebuffed by the personal representative of the UN secretary-general, Yasushi Akashi, and the overall commander of the UN forces in the former Yugoslavia, French General Bernard Janvier. After further VRS mortar attacks that killed sixteen people and wounded about sixty, on 24 May Smith called for a ceasefire and adherence to the heavy weapons exclusion zone around Sarajevo. He also issued the VRS with an ultimatum to return or withdraw the heavy weapons by noon on 25 May. When the deadline passed with no return or withdrawal of the weapons, Smith requested NATO air strikes against VRS ammunition depots at Jahorinski Potok just outside the self-proclaimed Bosnian Serb capital of Pale, 15 km (9.3 mi) east of Sarajevo, in response. This time Akashi and Janvier agreed.

== Air strikes ==
In response to the request from Smith, about 3:30 pm on 25 May, four US F-16Cs and two Spanish Air Force EF-18As, supported by US logistics aircraft and Spanish, Dutch and French fighters, dropped eleven laser guided bombs on two VRS ammunition depots at Jahorinski Potok. The resulting mushroom cloud could be seen from Sarajevo. That evening, in response to the air strike the VRS shelled five of the United Nations Safe Areas in Bosnia. During one of these, ordered by VRS general Novak Đukić, targeting the predominantly Bosnian Muslim-populated city of Tuzla 120 km (75 mi) north of Sarajevo, a shell exploded near an outdoor cafe popular with youth and young men, killing 71 civilians and wounding more than 150. The youngest victim was a two-year-old boy. In response to the shelling of Tuzla, and in advance of the expiration of a further deadline from Smith that was to expire at noon on 26 May, more air strikes were ordered. About 10:30 am on 26 May twelve NATO aircraft struck six more ammunition bunkers at Jahorinski Potok, damaging or destroying them all. (Note: Balkan Battlegrounds states on p. 564 that the second strike was on 27 May, but this is contradicted by the official NATO Factsheet and other sources which state it occurred on 26 May.) According to the author Viktor Bezruchenko, VRS casualties from the air strikes included four dead and 17 injured. The air strikes marked the first offensive operations carried out by the Spanish Air Force since the 1957 Ifni War in Spanish West Africa.

== Aftermath ==
On 27 and 28 May, 372 UN peacekeepers were seized, detained, held hostage or otherwise had their activities restricted by the VRS. On 2 June another five UN peacekeepers were detained, bringing the total to 377. Most of these were peacekeepers detained at the heavy weapon collection points around Sarajevo, but others were used as human shields to deter further NATO airstrikes, chained to bridges, military installations and other targets across Bosnian Serb-held parts of Bosnia and Herzegovina. Captured along with the peacekeepers were hundreds of sets of body armour and rifles, six French light tanks, and eleven French and Ukrainian armoured personnel carriers. Fears that this captured equipment would be abused by the VRS were immediately proven correct when VRS troops disguised as French peacekeepers infiltrated a French observation post on Sarajevo's Vrbanja Bridge on 27 May and captured it along with twelve French peacekeepers, resulting in the Battle of Vrbanja Bridge in which the French recaptured the observation post.

With the obvious risk of killing their own people being used as human shields by the VRS, UNPROFOR and NATO decided for the time being to cease using air strikes against the VRS to force compliance with UN resolutions. Frantic negotiations to release the peacekeeper hostages ensued, and UNPROFOR had to completely rethink its strategy and force structure. The hostages were released in several tranches and all had been freed by 19 June. The hostage taking and threats by the VRS caused the UN to change its approach. Isolated UN troops were consolidated into larger more defensible bases, the UN military observers in Serb-held areas were withdrawn, and an additional force element was added to UNPROFOR, the UN Rapid Reaction Force (RRF). The RRF was a two-brigade force with a composite artillery regiment and significant helicopter support which was part of the UN's new aggressive approach to defend threatened peacekeepers and retaliate for violations of UN resolutions. It played a significant role in defending UN troops and retaliating for VRS provocations when the use of NATO air strikes returned with a vengeance during the Operation Deliberate Force air campaign which began in August. The political scientist Micah Zenko describes the Pale air strikes as a military success but a political failure.

After the war, the Bosnian Serb commander responsible for the Tuzla massacre, Đukić, was prosecuted and convicted by the Court of Bosnia and Herzegovina and sentenced to twenty years' imprisonment for that and other crimes. The Bosnian Serb leader Radovan Karadžić and the VRS commander Mladić – who were responsible for ordering the hostage taking in the wake of the Pale air strikes – were prosecuted by the International Criminal Tribunal for the former Yugoslavia and sentenced to 40 years' imprisonment and life imprisonment respectively for those and other war crimes and crimes against humanity.

== See also ==
- Airstrike on Udbina Air Base
- 1994 Serb Jastreb J-21 shootdown
- 1995 US F-16C shootdown
