= Airstrike on Udbina Air Base =

1994 NATO strike in Croatia

Udbina air strike
- Part of Operation Deny Flight
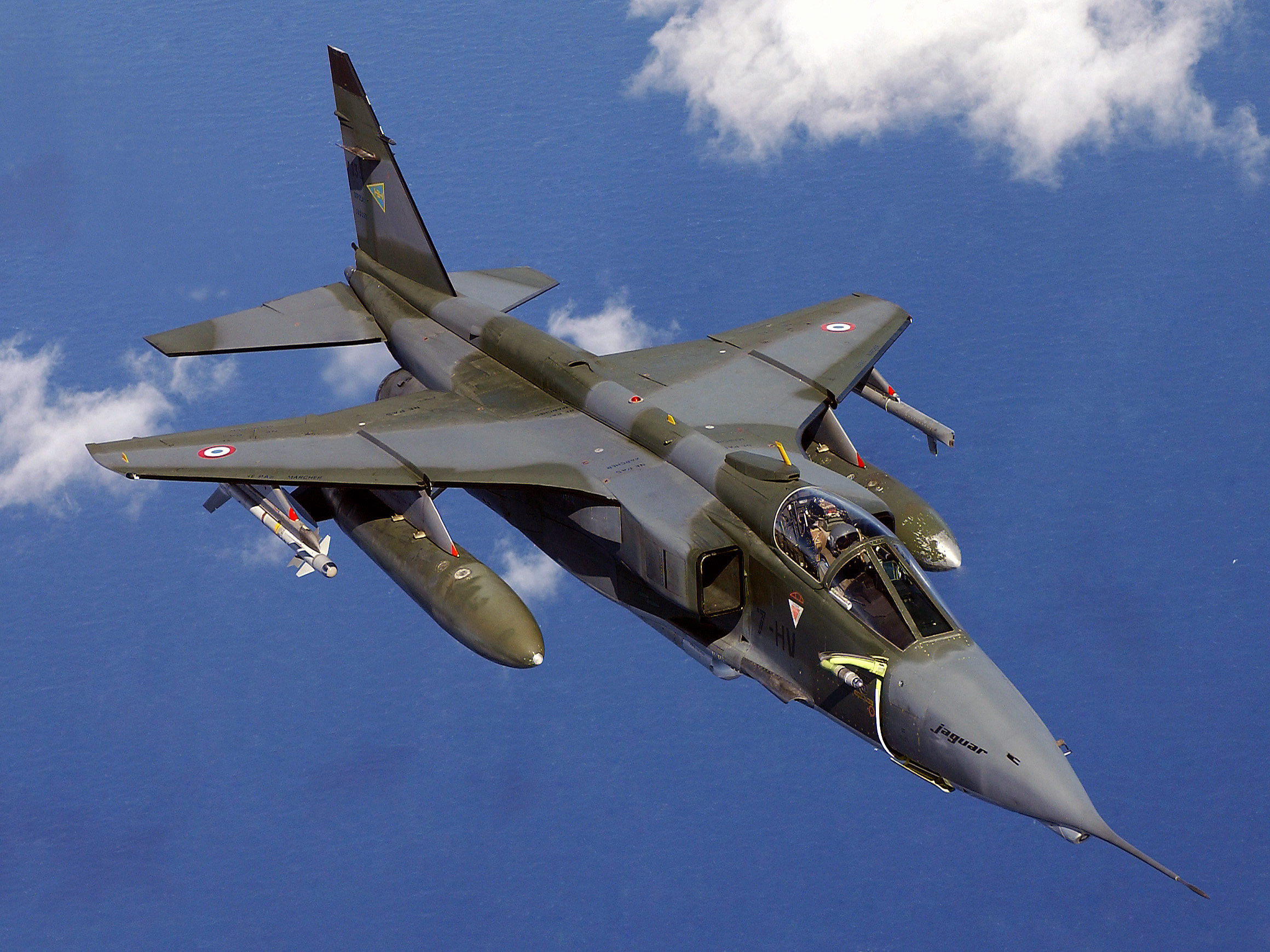
- A French Jaguar over the Adriatic Sea
Date	21 November 1994
Location	Udbina, Croatia 44°33′25″N 15°46′29″E
Result	NATO victory

Belligerents
NATO: United States; United Kingdom; France; Netherlands	Serbian Krajina

Commanders and leaders
(United States) Leighton W. Smith	(Republic of Serbian Krajina) Milan Martić (Republic of Serbian Krajina) Ratko Dopuđa

Units involved
United States Air Force; United States Marine Corps (United Kingdom) Royal Air Force (France) French Air Force; Royal Netherlands Air Force	Serbian Army of Krajina

Strength
39 attack aircraft 16 aircraft in supporting role	Anti-aircraft defenses

Casualties and losses
None	2 killed Several wounded 2 anti-aircraft batteries 1 SA-6 missile site Airstrip destroyed

On 21 November 1994, NATO aircraft taking part of Operation Deny Flight carried out an airstrike on the airbase of Udbina, Croatia, then part of the self-proclaimed Serbian Republic of Krajina. The Serbian Army of Krajina, through its 105th Aviation Brigade, had been launching air attacks on neighbour Bosnia and Herzegovina from the base in support of allied Serbian forces there, especially during the siege of Bihać. NATO forces intervened in order to deter further attacks. Two anti-aircraft SA-2 missile sites that the Serbs had used to attack Bihac in the ground-to-ground mode and to engage NATO aircraft were also destroyed in the following days. The bombing of Udbina was the largest air combat operation in Europe since World War II, and the largest combat operation in NATO's history up to that time.

== Bihac safe haven ==
In October and November 1994, allied Muslim-Croat forces launched a major offensive around the town of Bihać, in far northwestern Bosnia, which had been declared a safe zone for refugees by the UN. The Serbs soon launched a counterattack, and in support of their operations, they carried out air strikes with aircraft based at a former JNA military airport in Udbina, southwest of Bihać, within the boundaries of the Serbian Krajina.

=== Serb strikes ===
The Serb aircraft dropped napalm and cluster bombs on Bosnian positions in the Bihać pocket. The majority of the sorties released their bombs without flying on Bosnia's air space, and the jets perfected the tactic of flying below the radar screen, but the attacks were a clear violation of the no-fly zone anyway, and a challenge to NATO. The Krajina Serbs attacks began on 10 November on Cazin and Bihać itself, but these ones only involved the use of heavy artillery and SA-2 surface-to-air missiles in a ground-to-ground role.

On 18 November, two Orao ground attack aircraft dropped napalm and cluster bombs, while on the following day, other two aircraft launched four bombs on civilian facilities at Cazin. One of the jets, an Orao, was shot down and its pilot, identified as Boro Nović, was killed. Three of the bombs did not explode, but nine civilians lost their lives. Two Royal Air Force (RAF) Tornados pursued two Galeb after they attacked Bosnian positions around Bihać, but were forced to stop the chase when the Serb pilots flew into Croatian airspace, where NATO forces had no mandate.

As a response to the deteriorating situation in Bihać, the Security Council passed Resolution 958, which allowed NATO aircraft to operate over Croatia. On 21 November, NATO acted under its new authority by planning a strike on the Udbina airfield.

== NATO airstrike ==
The attack on Udbina airfield was originally planned for 20 November, but the operation was aborted due to poor weather conditions.

On Monday 21 November, NATO eventually carried out what became the biggest air attack in its 45-year history. The operation involved 39 attack aircraft and another 16 in charge of pre-strike surveillance, resupply, early warning, command and control, post-strike surveillance and electronic countermeasures. According to British sources, only French Air Force and RAF Jaguar fighters actually dropped bombs on the airbase and anti-aircraft sites in the area. The aircraft took off from five Italian air bases, and the airstrike lasted from 13:00 to 13:45 local time. F-16A Fighting Falcons from the Royal Netherlands Air Force provided protection to the strike force, while reconnaissance and electronic jamming was carried out by French Mirage 2000s, United States Air Force (USAF) EF-111 Ravens, F-15E Strike Eagles, F-16s and United States Marine Corps Aviation (USMC) F/A-18 Hornets.

The first targets to be engaged were the SA-6 battery and the anti-aircraft artillery defending the base. NATO fighters dropped cluster bombs on them. The Serb crews manning the equipment were alerted in advance, in order to avoid major casualties. Precision guided ordnance and gravity bombs were then used to strike the airfield. In a show of restraint, the bombers spared some 20 Serbian ground-attack aircraft parked on the runway's end. A damage assessment at dusk revealed that the airstrip had been badly hit in five places. The commander of the Serb airbase, Colonel Ratko Dopudja, acknowledged the loss of two military personnel and several wounded.

=== Follow-up operations ===
On 22 November, two Royal Navy Sea Harriers from the carrier HMS Invincible were engaged by Serb anti-aircraft missiles. The British aircraft managed to outmaneuver the missiles and escaped unscathed.

The next day, NATO launched a reconnaissance air package including RAF Jaguars, French Mirage 2000s and USAF F-16s to search the area. The air patrol was escorted by two U.S. Navy EA-6B Prowlers, armed with AGM-88 HARM anti-radiation missiles. When a Serb SA-2 radar from Otoka illuminated one of the surveillance aircraft, the EA-6Bs fired two HARMs at the anti-aircraft position. Both missiles hit home. A third missile was launched at a second SA-2 missile site at Dvor, in Croatia. After a damage assessment, Otoka's missile site was once again the subject of an airstrike later in the day when USAF F-15Es dropped GBU-12 laser-guided bombs on the area.

== Aftermath ==
The airbase at Udbina was put out of commission for nearly a month. The air raid, however, had no immediate effect on the military situation on the ground around Bihać. On the contrary, the Bosnian 5th Bosnian Army Corps stopped their offensive and withdrew to their original positions, followed by thousands of refugees.

Elsewhere, Serb authorities in Bosnia reacted by taking 500 UNPROFOR hostages by early December, including three that were forced to remain on the tarmac of Banja Luka airstrip as human shields. Serb ground forces also continued to hamper NATO air patrols by locking on to and firing anti-aircraft missiles at them; two RAF Tornados evaded radar-guided missiles on 24 November, while two F-16s were fired at the next day.

The Serbian seizure of hostages and escalating harassment of NATO aircraft compelled the alliance to suspend flights over Bosnia and Croatia by 2 December. After former U.S. president Jimmy Carter brokered a four-month ceasefire agreement, NATO operations were scaled down and Serbs forces released all UNPROFOR hostages. Notwithstanding, NATO surveillance continued, and on 17 December a French navy Super Etendard from the aircraft carrier Foch was hit by a shoulder-launched anti-aircraft missile. The damaged fighter managed to return to Foch.

The airbase was eventually overrun by Croatian forces on 7 August 1995, during Operation Storm.

== See also ==
- 1994 Gorazde airstrikes
- 1994 Serb Jastreb J-21 shootdown
- 1995 US F-16C shootdown
- May 1995 Pale air strikes
