= 105th Aviation Brigade =

105th Aviation Brigade: 105. ваздухопловна бригада; 105. vazduhoplovna brigada
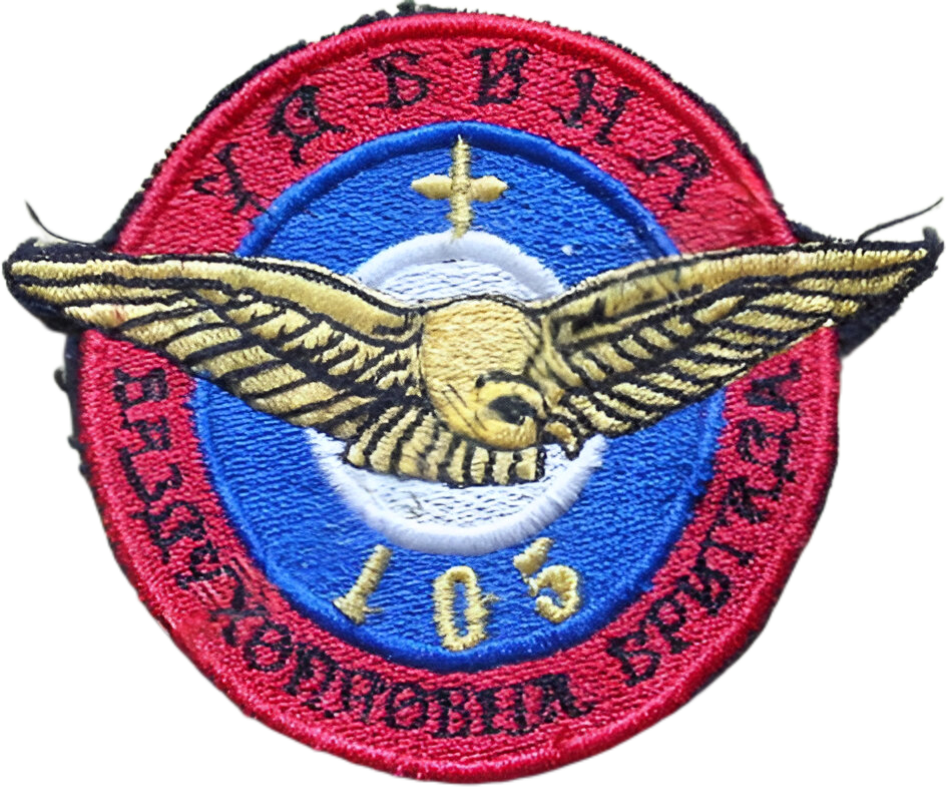
- Patch of the air force brigade
- Active: 1993–1995
- Disbanded: 1995
- Country: Serbian Krajina
- Branch: Serbian Army of Krajina
- Garrison/HQ: Udbina
- Engagements: Croatian War; Operation Medak Pocket; 1994 Serb Jastreb J-21 shootdown; Airstrike on Udbina Air Base; Operation Flash; Operation Storm

Insignia
- Fin Flash

- Roundel

The 105th Aviation Brigade (Serbo-Croatian: 105. ваздухопловна бригада, 105. vazduhoplovna brigada) was formed from the disbanded Yugoslav 105th Fighter-Bomber Aviation Regiment in the spring of 1993 by the Serbian Army of Krajina at Udbina Airport. Its accurate organization is unknown, and it's not exactly clear whether the brigade was part of Republika Srpska Air Force, as the aircraft had the same roundels.

It consisted of at least one combat squadron, nicknamed "Kobre" (Cobras - the same as the former 249th Squadron) and the 56th Mixed Helicopter Squadron.

The brigade was equipped with 12 J-21 Jastreb light ground-attack aircraft, at least two G-2 Galeb trainer jets, 4 Soko Gazelle helicopters and four Gazelle Gama anti-tank helicopters, two Mil Mi-8T transport helicopters, one Antonov An-2 and number of Utva 66, Utva 75, J-20 Kraguj and Zlin Z-526 aircraft.

Aircraft from Udbina airport have taken part in wars in both Croatia and Bosnia because the Republika Srpska Air Force aircraft at Banja Luka airport were unable to take off under the no-fly zone over Bosnia and Herzegovina. In several combats Gazelle Gama anti-tank helicopters were very effective destroying Croatian army tanks.

At the time of the Croatian Operation Storm most of aircraft in flying condition had retreated to Banja Luka. Transport helicopters had performed their last evacuation flights. By the fall of the Republic of Serbian Krajina in summer 1995 and the defeat of the Serbian Army of Krajina, the 105th Aviation Brigade ceased to exist.

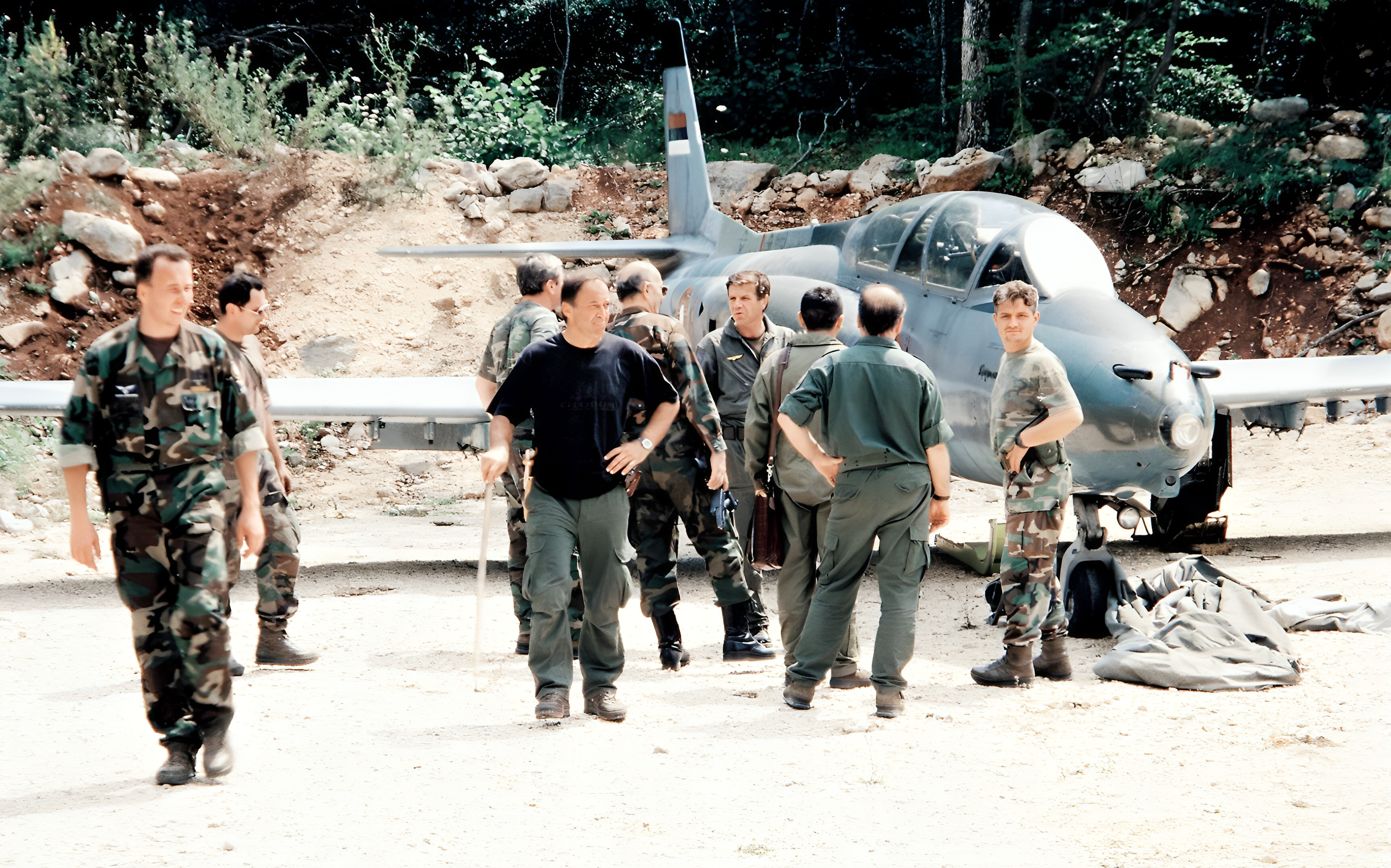
G2 Galeb captured by the Croats during operation oluja

The commander of the brigade was Ratko Dopuđa.

== Gallery ==
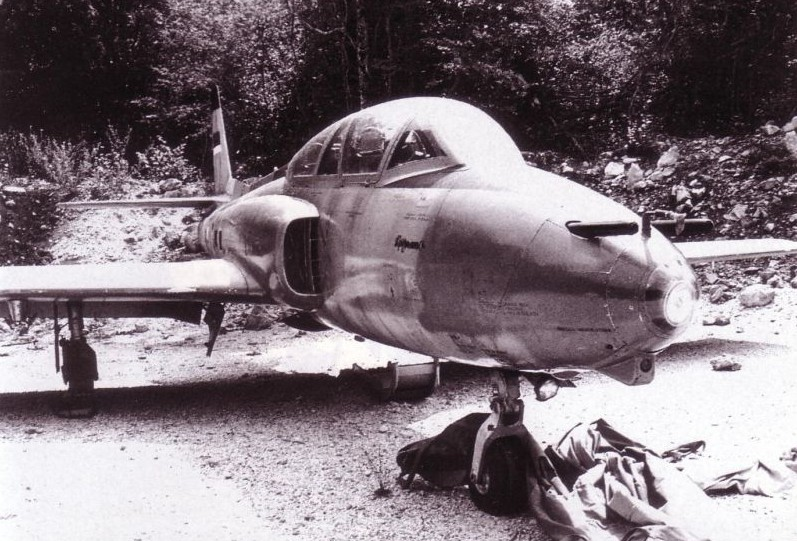
Krajina Airforce G-2 Galeb

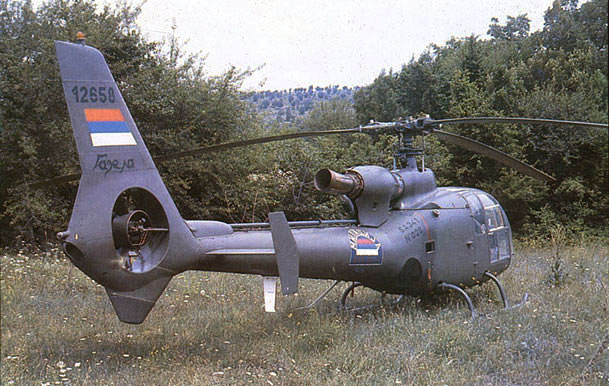
Krajina Airforce Aérospatiale Gazelle

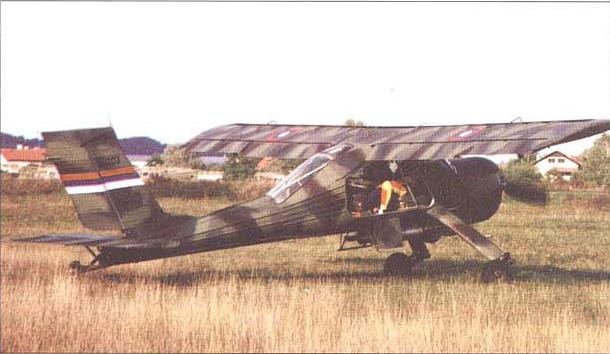
Krajina Airforce Utva 66

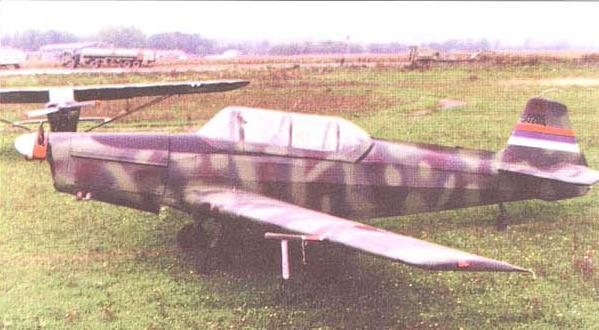
Krajina Airforce Zlin Z-526

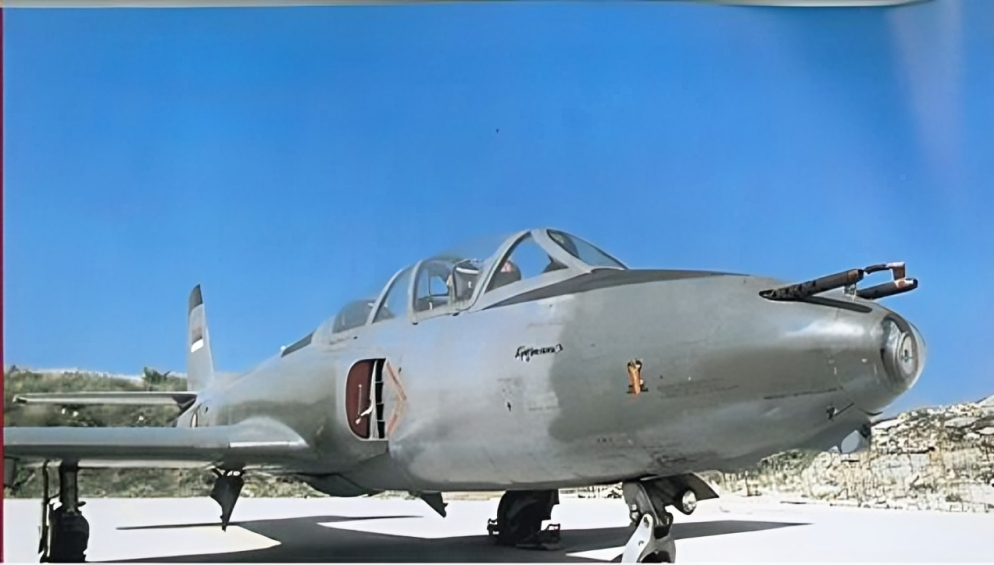
j21 with the cobras insignia on it

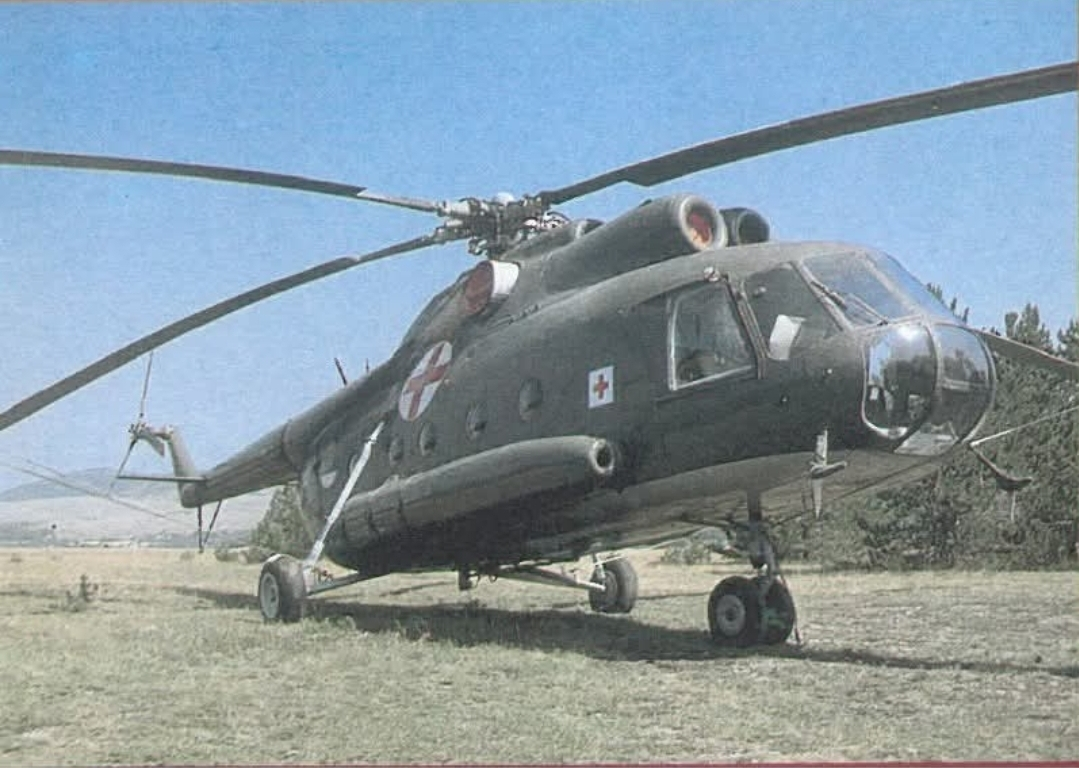
MI-8 of the krajina air force

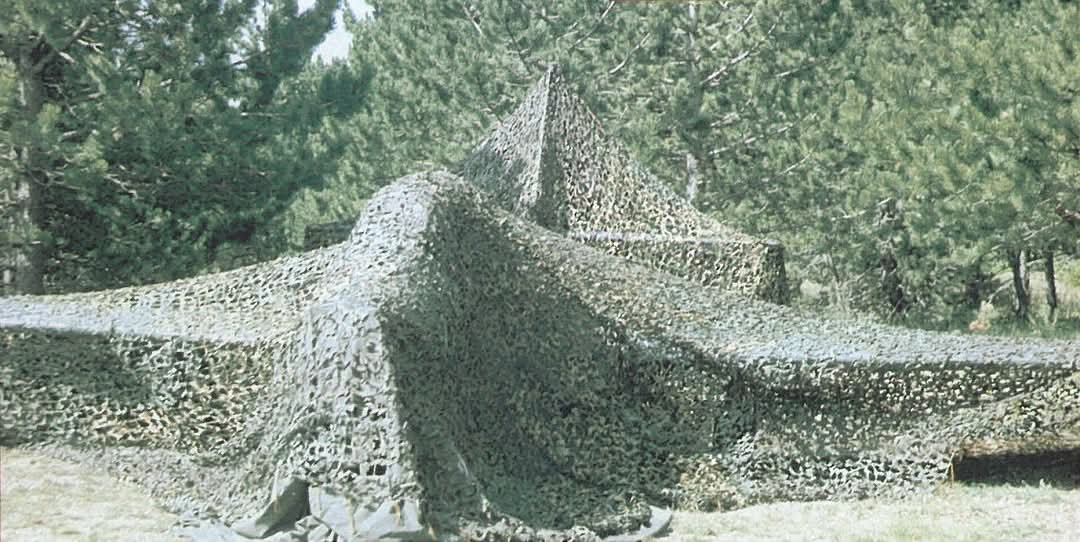
SVK G2 galeb under cover

== See also ==
- Airstrike on Udbina Air Base
- Banja Luka incident
