= Battle of Vrbanja Bridge =

1995 Bosnian War confrontation

- Part of the Bosnian War
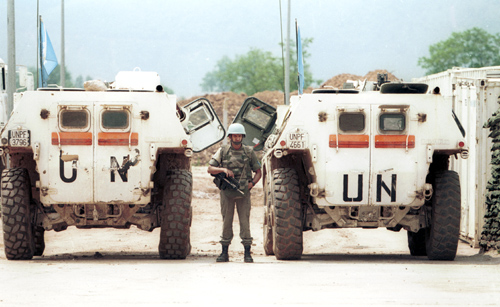
- UNPROFOR French VAB armoured personnel carriers during the siege of Sarajevo
Date	27 May 1995
Location	Vrbanja Bridge, Sarajevo, Bosnia and Herzegovina 43°51′12″N 18°24′23″E
Result	French United Nations peacekeepers retake observation post

Belligerents
Army of Republika Srpska (VRS)	UNPROFOR: (France) French Army

Commanders and leaders
Unknown	Erik Sandahl; François Lecointre

Strength
14 men; 1 captured French armoured personnel carrier	100 men; 6 ERC 90 Sagaie armoured cars; Several VAB armoured personnel carriers

Casualties and losses
4 killed; Several wounded; 4 captured (later released)	2 killed; 17 wounded; 12 taken hostage (later released)
- Location within Bosnia and Herzegovina Battle of Vrbanja Bridge (Yugoslavia)

The Battle of Vrbanja Bridge ([ʋr̩baɲa], wer-bahn-yah) was an armed confrontation which took place on 27 May 1995, between United Nations (UN) peacekeepers from the French Army and elements of the Bosnian Serb Army of Republika Srpska (VRS). The fighting occurred at the Vrbanja Bridge crossing of the Miljacka river in Sarajevo, Bosnia and Herzegovina, during the Bosnian War. The VRS seized the French-manned United Nations Protection Force (UNPROFOR) observation posts on both ends of the bridge, taking hostage 12 French peacekeepers. Ten were taken away, and two were kept at the bridge as human shields.

A platoon of 30 French peacekeepers led by Captain François Lecointre recaptured the bridge with the support of 70 French infantrymen and direct fire from armoured vehicles. During the French assault, elements of the Army of the Republic of Bosnia and Herzegovina (ARBiH) opened fire on the VRS-held observation posts on their own initiative, accidentally wounding one French hostage. Two French soldiers were killed during the battle, and 17 were wounded. The VRS's casualties were four killed, several wounded and four captured. After the battle, VRS forces were observed to be less likely to engage French UN peacekeepers deployed in the city. In 2017, Lecointre, by then an army general, was appointed as France's Chief of the Defence Staff.

== Background ==
The Vrbanja Bridge was located in no-man's land between the besieged Army of the Republic of Bosnia and Herzegovina (Armija Republike Bosne i Hercegovine, ARBiH) and the surrounding Army of Republika Srpska (Vojska Republike Srpske, VRS) during the 1992–1996 siege of Sarajevo in Bosnia and Herzegovina. It was surrounded by tall buildings, which made it a target of sniper-fire from the beginning of the Bosnian War. On 5 April 1992, protestors were shot on the bridge by armed Bosnian Serb police. Two women, Suada Dilberović and Olga Sučić, died as a result, and are considered by many to be the first victims of the war.

In March 1995, while the North Atlantic Treaty Organization (NATO) was planning a new strategy in support of the United Nations (UN) peacekeeping operations in Bosnia and Herzegovina, a ceasefire brokered by former United States President Jimmy Carter between the ARBiH and the VRS expired and fighting resumed. As the struggle gradually widened, the ARBiH launched a large-scale offensive around Sarajevo. In response, the VRS seized heavy weapons from a UN-guarded depot and began shelling targets around the city, prompting the Commander of Bosnia and Herzegovina Command, British Lieutenant General Rupert Smith, to request NATO air strikes against the VRS. NATO responded on 25 and 26 May 1995 by bombing a VRS ammunition dump in the Bosnian Serb capital, Pale. The mission was carried out by United States Air Force F-16s and Spanish Air Force EF-18A Hornets armed with laser-guided bombs. The VRS then seized 377 United Nations Protection Force (UNPROFOR) hostages and used them as human shields for a variety of potential NATO airstrike targets in Bosnia and Herzegovina, forcing NATO to end air operations against the VRS. Of the UN hostages taken by the Bosnian Serbs, 92 were French.

== Battle ==
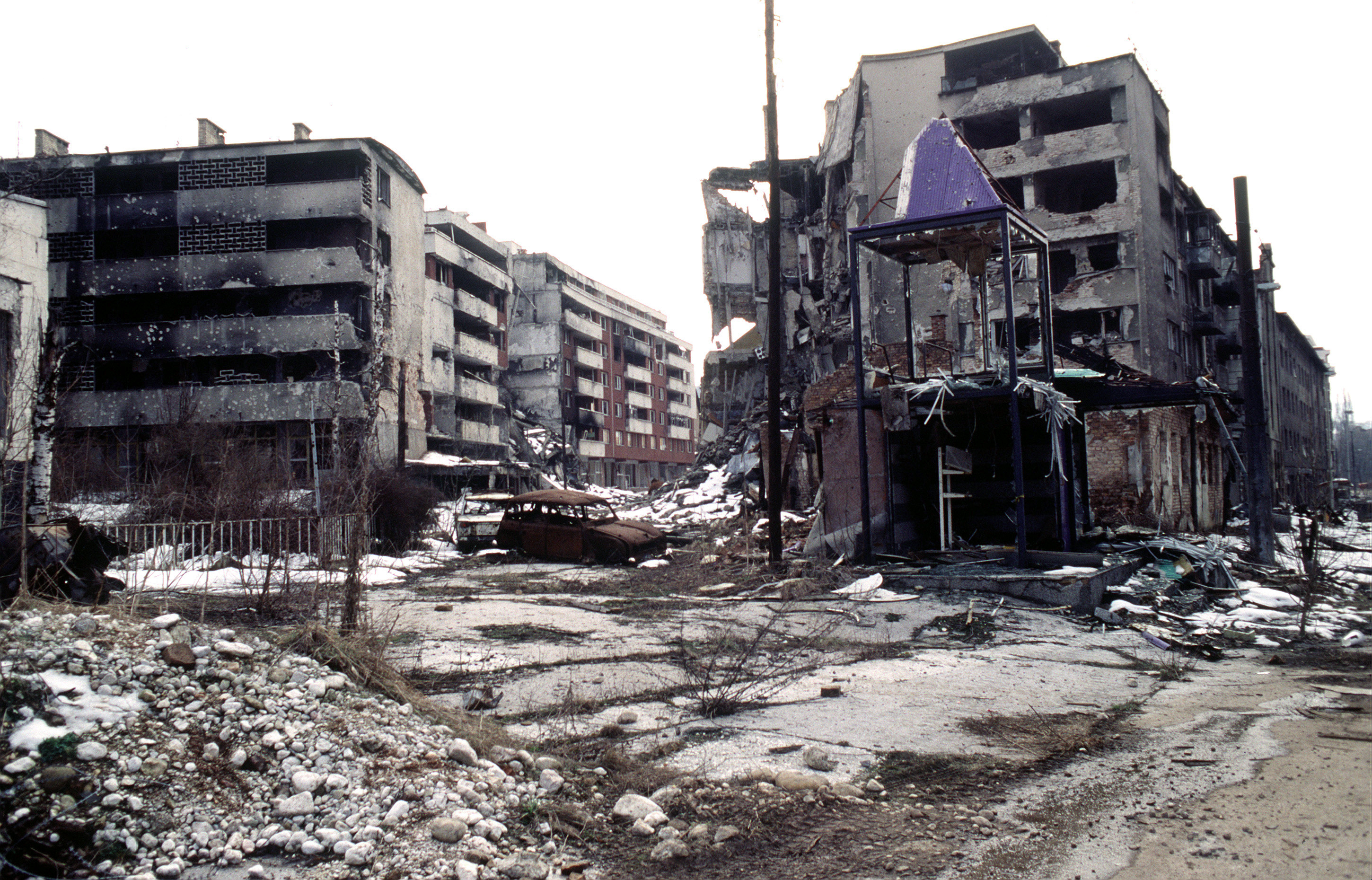
The battle-damaged Sarajevo suburb of Grbavica near the Vrbanja bridge over the Miljacka river

=== VRS attack ===
On 27 May 1995 at 04:30, VRS soldiers posing as French troops captured the UN observation posts on both ends of the Vrbanja Bridge without firing a shot. They wore French uniforms, flak jackets, helmets, and personal weapons and drove a French armoured personnel carrier (APC) – all captured from UN troops detained outside the city. The Serbs disarmed the twelve French peacekeepers on the bridge at gunpoint. Ten were taken away, and two hostages remained at the bridge as human shields. According to Colonel Erik Sandahl, commander of the 4th French Battalion (FREBAT4) which was at that time provided by the 3rd Marine Infantry Regiment, "when the Serbs took our soldiers under their control by threat, by dirty tricks, they began to act as terrorists, you cannot support this. You must react. The moment comes when you have to stop it. Full stop. And we did."

=== French reaction ===
The first evidence the French UN troops received that something was wrong at the Vrbanja Bridge was radio silence from the French post. About 05:20, the company commander, Captain François Lecointre, unable to make radio contact with the posts, drove to the bridge to find out what was happening. He was met by a Serb sentry in French uniform who attempted to take him prisoner. Lecointre quickly turned around and drove to Skenderija stadium, the headquarters of FREBAT4. When news of the takeover of the bridge reached the newly elected French President, Jacques Chirac, he circumvented the UN chain of command and ordered an assault to retake the bridge from the Bosnian Serbs.

The French command in Bosnia-Herzegovina responded by sending a platoon of 30 FREBAT4 troops from the 3rd Marine Infantry Regiment to re-capture the northern end of the bridge, backed by another 70 French infantry, six ERC 90 Sagaie armoured cars and several VAB APCs. The assault force was led by Lecointre, who approached the northern edge of the bridge following the usual route of the UN convoys. Fourteen VRS soldiers were in the post at the time of the assault. With bayonets fixed, the French marines overran a bunker held by the VRS, at the cost of the life of one Frenchman, Private Jacky Humblot. The assault was supported by 90-millimetre (3.5 in) direct fire from the armoured cars, and heavy machine-gun fire. The VRS responded with mortar bombs and fire from anti-aircraft weapons. The second French soldier to die in the battle, Private Marcel Amaru, was killed by a sniper while supporting the assault from Sarajevo's Jewish cemetery. Seventeen French soldiers were wounded in the clash, while four VRS soldiers were killed, several more were wounded, and four were taken prisoner.

ARBiH snipers joined the fight on their own initiative, accidentally shooting and wounding one French hostage. At the conclusion of the 32-minute-long firefight, the VRS remained in control of the southern end of the bridge, while the French occupied the northern end. The VRS then obtained a truce to recover their dead and wounded, under the threat of killing the French hostages. The wounded French soldier was immediately released and evacuated to a UN hospital. The VRS eventually gave up and abandoned the southern end of the bridge. The second French soldier held as hostage at the bridge, a corporal, managed to escape. The VRS soldiers captured in the action were treated as prisoners of war and detained at an UNPROFOR facility.

== Aftermath ==
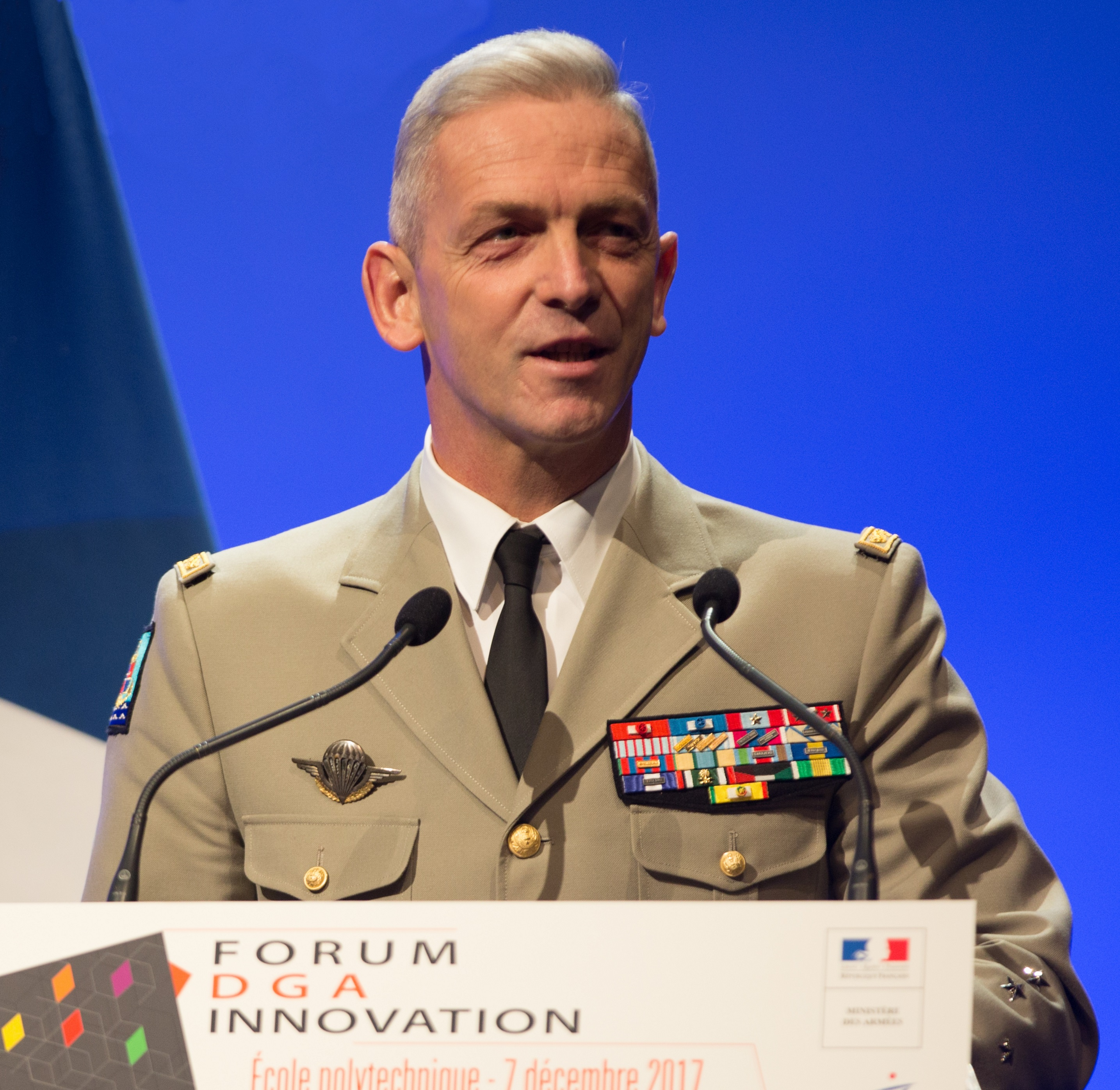
General François Lecointre, who led the French troops during the battle, speaking at an event at École polytechnique in Palaiseau in 2017

Facing the ongoing hostage crisis, Smith and other top UN commanders began to shift strategy. The UN began redeploying its forces to more defensible locations, so that they would be harder to attack and more difficult to take hostage. On 16 June 1995, United Nations Security Council Resolution 998 was passed, establishing a British-French-Dutch UN Rapid Reaction Force (UN RRF) under Smith's direction. Authorised to a strength of 12,500 troops, the UN RRF was a heavily armed formation with more aggressive rules of engagement, designed to take offensive action if necessary to prevent hostage-taking and enforce peace agreements. The remaining UN hostages taken throughout the country were released two days later, as were the four VRS members captured at the Vrbanja Bridge.

As the UN RRF deployed in June and July, it became clear that the UN was moving towards a peace enforcement stance rather than a peacekeeping one. The British sent artillery and an air-mobile brigade including attack helicopters, and the force did not paint its vehicles white or wear blue helmets, as was usual on UN missions. On 1 August, following the fall of the United Nations Safe Areas (UNSA) of Srebrenica and Žepa to the VRS, senior British, French, and US officers warned the VRS commander, General Ratko Mladić, that any further attacks on UNSAs would result in NATO and the UN using "disproportionate" and "overwhelming" force.

According to the top French officers involved in the battle, the action at the Vrbanja Bridge showed the VRS that UNPROFOR's attitude had changed. Following the battle, VRS forces were observed to be less likely to engage the French UN peacekeepers deployed in the city. Lieutenant Colonel Erik Roussel, an officer from FREBAT4 who had participated in the operation, said later that "since the incident, the Serbs are strangely quiet towards us." Chirac's actions were not backed by all of his government, and the Chief of the Defence Staff, Admiral Jacques Lanxade, threatened to resign. Lanxade was supported by French Prime Minister Alain Juppé and Defence Minister Charles Millon, but they were overruled by Chirac.

On 30 August, at the commencement of NATO's Operation Deliberate Force, with the combined air and ground campaign against the VRS, the UN RRF fired 600 artillery rounds on VRS artillery positions around Sarajevo. The UN RRF played an important part in ending the siege and in forcing the Bosnian Serbs to the negotiating table later that year. On 20 December 1995, UNPROFOR was relieved by the NATO Implementation Force, following the successful negotiation of the Dayton Agreement peace accords. A memorial to the French soldiers killed in action was unveiled on 5 April 1996, along with a plaque commemorating Dilberović and Sučić. That day, the bridge was renamed the Suada Dilberović Bridge; in 1999 it was renamed the Suada and Olga Bridge (Most Suade i Olge) in memory of both women. In 2017, Lecointre, made famous by the bayonet charge at the bridge and now an army general, was appointed as the French Chief of the Defence Staff.

Positive public opinion in France about French peacekeeping in the Bosnian War remained slightly above average for European countries throughout the mission, with the majority of the French population strongly in favour of military intervention throughout. This was eventually matched by French policy, which had started from a position that deprecated the use of force.

== See also ==
Other incidents involving UNPROFOR clashes with the VRS:

- Operation Bøllebank
- Operation Amanda
