= 1994 Goražde air strikes =

NATO attacks during its intervention in Bosnia

Goražde air strikes
- Part of NATO intervention in Bosnia and Operation Deny Flight
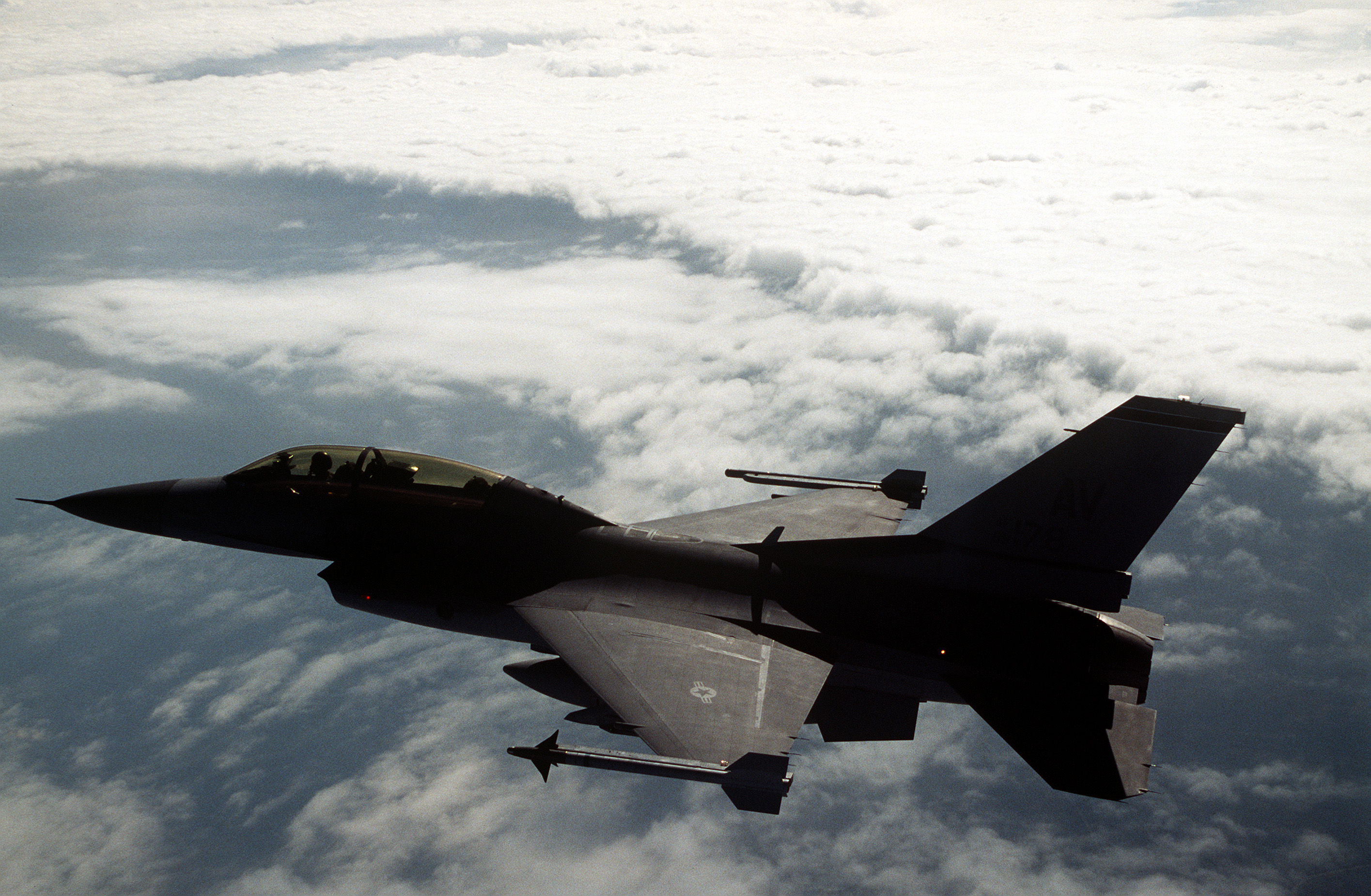
- A USAF F-16c during Operation Deny Flight
Date	10 – 16 April 1994
Location	around Goražde
Result	NATO operational failure

Belligerents
NATO; United Nations	Republika Srpska

Commanders and leaders
(United States) Jeremy M. Boorda	

Casualties and losses
1 British BAE Sea Harrier shot down 1 French Super Etendard damaged 1 SAS member killed 1 SAS member wounded 150 UNPROFOR POWs	1 command outpost damaged

The Goražde air strikes was a series of NATO actions under the umbrella of operation Deny Fly to stop the Serbian offensive on Goražde, Bosnia. As a result, a Serbian command post was hit by American aircraft, while on the NATO side a British fighter was shot down and a French strike aircraft sustained damage. On the ground, one Special Air Service British soldier was killed and another wounded, while 150 UNPROFOR soldiers were taken hostage. In the end, NATO stopped air operations over Goražde and the Serbs agreed to halt their offensive in the area.

== Background ==
On 12 March, the United Nations Protection Force (UNPROFOR) made its first request for NATO air support, but close air support was not deployed, owing to a number of delays associated with the approval process. On 6 April VRS started Operation Star 94 pushing the ARBiH and approaching Goražde. On 10 and 11 April 1994, UNPROFOR called in air strikes to protect the Goražde safe area, resulting in the bombing of a Bosnian Serb military command outpost near Goražde by two US F-16 jets.

== Campaign ==
Two US F-16 jets bombed a Serb military command outpost near Goražde on 10 April. This was the first time in NATO's history it had ever attacked ground targets with aircraft. The VRS stopped the offensive momentarily. In reaction to the NATO attack, VRS took 150 UN personnel hostage on 14 April. Despite the now more difficult situation due to NATO pressure, the VRS continues to break through Bosniak lines and reach the first houses in the town of Goražde, where the city battles begin. Serbian fighters arrive only 300 meters from the hospital in Goražde. The VRS gets a special boost in morale after hitting two NATO planes. First, on April 15, a French Super Etendard on a photo reconnaissance mission was hit and damaged, and the next day a British Sea Harrier was shot down. Both aircraft were hit by MANPADS 9K38 Igla missiles. Also on April 15, two British SAS soldiers on the ground, operating as air controllers on the frontline, came under Serb heavy fire. One of them was killed and the other wounded.

== Aftermath ==
In the negotiations with UNPROFOR on 18 April, it was agreed that Goražde would be a demilitarized zone, ending the VRS offensive. And on 18 April VRS would end the Operation Star 94.

== See also ==
- Banja Luka incident
- Udbina airstrike
- Pale airstrikes
- Scott O'Grady

== Sources ==
- Ripley, Tim (2001). Conflict in the Balkans, 1991–2000. London: Osprey Publishing. ISBN 1-84176-290-3.
