= Operation Deliberate Force =

1995 campaign by NATO and UN forces against Republika Srpska during the Bosnian War

- Part of the NATO intervention in Bosnia and Herzegovina during the Bosnian War
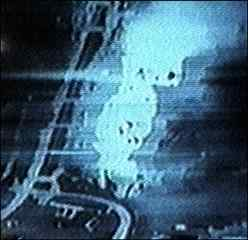
- View from a USAF aircraft FLIR camera after an airstrike on a VRS position, somewhere in Bosnia.
Date	30 August – 20 September 1995
Location	Bosnia and Herzegovina
Result	Lifting of Siege of Sarajevo

Belligerents
NATO: France; Germany; Italy; Netherlands; Spain; Turkey; United Kingdom; United States; (United Nations) UNPROFOR	Republika Srpska

Commanders and leaders
(NATO) / (United States) Leighton Smith (NATO) / (United States) Michael E. Ryan (NATO) / (United Kingdom) Stuart Peach (United Nations) / (France) Bernard Janvier (United Nations) / (France) André Soubirou (United Nations) / (United Kingdom) Sir Rupert Smith (United Nations) / (United Kingdom) Dick Applegate (United Kingdom) Sir Mark Mans	(Republika Srpska (1992–1995)) Ratko Mladić (Republika Srpska (1992–1995)) Radislav Krstić

Strength
(NATO) 400 aircraft (NATO) 5,000 military personnel (NATO) 1 Ticonderoga-class cruiser (United Nations) 500 French peacekeepers (United Nations) 320 British peacekeepers (United Nations) Dutch 1e Mortiercompagnie, Korps Mariniers (United Nations) 12 105mm guns (United Nations) 8 155mm howitzers (United Nations) 12 British Warrior AFVs	(Republika Srpska) 80,000 soldiers

Casualties and losses
(France) 1 Mirage 2000N shot down (France) 2 pilots POW (United States) 1 MQ-1 Predator shot down	(Republika Srpska) 51 soldiers killed (Republika Srpska) 98 soldiers wounded (Republika Srpska) 338 different targets hit, most of them destroyed

Operation Deliberate Force was a sustained air campaign conducted by NATO, in concert with the UNPROFOR ground operations, to undermine the military capability of the Army of Republika Srpska (VRS), which had threatened and attacked UN-designated "safe areas" in Bosnia and Herzegovina during the Bosnian War, with the Srebrenica genocide and Markale massacres precipitating the intervention. The shelling of the Sarajevo marketplace on 28 August 1995 by the VRS is considered to be the immediate instigating factor behind NATO's decision to launch the operation.

The operation was carried out between 30 August and 20 September 1995, involving 400 aircraft and 5,000 personnel from 15 nations. Commanded by Admiral Leighton W. Smith Jr., the campaign struck 338 Bosnian Serb targets, many of which were destroyed. Overall, 1,026 bombs were dropped during the operation, 708 of which were precision-guided. On 19 occasions, depleted uranium munitions were used against targets around Sarajevo and Han Pijesak.

The bombing campaign was also roughly conterminous with Operation Mistral 2, two linked military offensives of the Croatian Army, the Army of the Republic of Bosnia and Herzegovina, and the Croatian Defence Council launched in western Bosnia. The campaign also led the way for a negotiated settlement, helping lift the siege of Sarajevo.

== Background ==
The Bosnian War was an international armed conflict that took place in Bosnia and Herzegovina between 1 April 1992 and 14 December 1995. After popular pressure, NATO was asked by the United Nations to intervene in the Bosnian War after allegations of war crimes against civilians were made. In response to the refugee and humanitarian crisis in Bosnia, the United Nations Security Council passed Resolution 743 on 21 February 1992, creating UNPROFOR. The UNPROFOR mandate was to keep the population alive and deliver humanitarian aid to refugees in Bosnia until the war ended.

On 9 October 1992, the UNSC passed Resolution 781, prohibiting unauthorized military flights in Bosnian airspace. This resolution led to Operation Sky Monitor, where NATO monitored violations of the no-fly zone, but it did not take action against violators of the resolution. On 31 March 1993, in response to 500 documented violations, the UNSC passed Resolution 816, which authorized states to use measures "to ensure compliance" with the no-fly zone over Bosnia. In response, on 12 April, NATO initiated Operation Deny Flight, which was tasked with enforcing the no-fly zone and allowed to engage the violators of the no-fly zone. However, Serb forces on the ground continued to attack UN "safe areas" in Bosnia, and the UN peacekeepers were unable to fight back as the mandate did not give them authority to do so. On 4 June, the UNSC passed Resolution 836 authorizing the use of force by UNPROFOR in the protection of specially designated safe zones. Operation Sharp Guard, a naval blockade in the Adriatic Sea by NATO and the Western European Union, was approved at a joint session of NATO and the WEU on 8 June and began on 15 June.

On 6 February 1994, a day after the first Markale marketplace massacre, UN Secretary-General Boutros Boutros-Ghali formally requested NATO to confirm that air strikes would be carried out immediately. On 9 February, agreeing to the request of the UN, NATO authorized the Commander of Allied Joint Force Command Naples (CINCSOUTH), US Admiral Jeremy Boorda, to launch air strikes against artillery and mortar positions in and around Sarajevo that were determined by UNPROFOR to be responsible for attacks against civilian targets. Only Greece did not support the use of air strikes, but it did not veto the proposal. The council also issued an ultimatum at the 9 February meeting to the Bosnian Serbs, in which they demanded that the Serbs remove their heavy weapons around Sarajevo by midnight of 20–21 February or face air strikes. There was some confusion surrounding compliance with the ultimatum, and Hungarian Prime Minister Péter Boross announced that Hungary's air space would be closed to NATO aircraft in the event of air strikes. On 12 February 1994, Sarajevo enjoyed its first casualty-free day in 22 months since April 1992.

On 28 February, NATO fighters operating under Deny Flight shot down four Bosnian Serb fighters for violating a no-fly zone in what would become known as the Banja Luka incident. This was the first combat operation in the history of NATO.

On 12 March, the United Nations Protection Force (UNPROFOR) made its first request for NATO air support, but close air support was not deployed, owing to a number of delays associated with the approval process. On 10 and 11 April 1994, UNPROFOR called in air strikes to protect the Goražde safe area, resulting in the bombing of a Bosnian Serb military command outpost near Goražde by two US F-16 jets. This was the first time in NATO's history it had ever attacked ground targets with aircraft. Subsequently, the Bosnian Serbs took 150 UN personnel hostage on 14 April. On 16 April, a British Sea Harrier was shot down over Goražde by Bosnian Serb forces. That would become known as the Goražde incident. Around 29 April, a Danish contingent on peacekeeping duty in Bosnia, as part of UNPROFOR's Nordic battalion located in Tuzla, was ambushed when trying to relieve a Swedish observation post that was under heavy artillery fire by the Bosnian Serb Šekovići brigade at the village of Kalesija, but the ambush was dispersed when the UN forces retaliated with heavy fire in what would be known as Operation Bøllebank.

On 5 August, at the request of the UNPROFOR, two US A-10 Thunderbolts located and strafed a Bosnian Serb anti-tank vehicle near Sarajevo after the Serbs seized weapons that had been impounded by UN troops and attacking a UN helicopter. Afterwards, the Serbs agreed to return the remaining heavy weapons. On 22 September 1994, NATO aircraft carried out an air strike against a Bosnian Serb tank at the request of UNPROFOR.

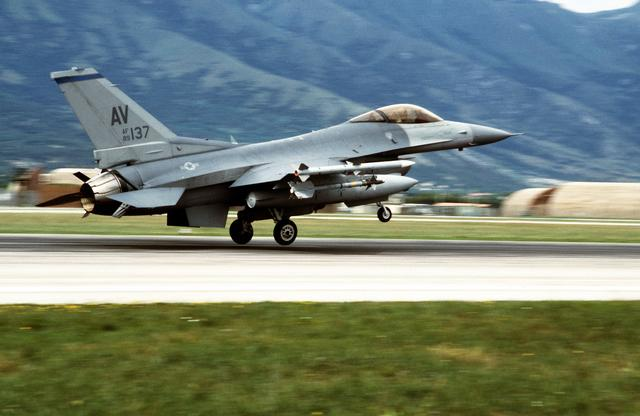
A USAF F-16C aircraft returns to Aviano Air Base, Italy, after conducting airstrikes on VRS positions.

On 25–26 May 1995, after violations of the exclusion zones and the shelling of safe areas, NATO aircraft carried out air strikes against Bosnian Serb ammunition depots in Pale. In retaliation, the Bosnian Serbs took 370 UN peacekeepers in Bosnia hostage and subsequently used them as human shields at potential targets in a successful bid to prevent further air strikes. On 2 June, two US Air Force F-16 jets were sent on patrol over Bosnia in support of Operation Deny Flight. While on patrol, an F-16 piloted by Captain Scott O'Grady was shot down by a Bosnian Serb 2K12 Kub surface-to-air missile. O'Grady was forced to eject from the aircraft. Six days later, he was rescued by US Marines from the 24th Marine Expeditionary Unit from USS Kearsarge.

On 11 July, NATO aircraft attacked targets in the Srebrenica area of Bosnia and Herzegovina as identified by and under the control of the United Nations. This was in response to Bosnian Serb forces advancing on the UN-declared Safe Area of Srebrenica. Bosnian Serb warlord Ratko Mladić threatened to kill 50 UN peacekeepers who were seized as hostages and also threatened to shell the Muslim population in Srebrenica if NATO air strikes continued. The UN peacekeepers called off the air strikes and agreed to withdraw from Srebrenica as the Bosnian Serbs promised they would take care of the Muslim population for the peacekeepers to spare their own lives. For two weeks, VRS forces under Mladić killed over 8,000 Bosniaks, mainly men and boys, in the Srebrenica massacre, which remains the worst act of genocide in Europe since World War II.

On 25 July, the North Atlantic Council authorized military planning aimed at deterring an attack on the safe area of Goražde, and threatened the use of NATO air power if this safe area was threatened or attacked. On 1 August, the Council took similar decisions aimed at deterring attacks on the safe areas of Sarajevo, Bihać, and Tuzla. On 4 August, NATO aircraft conducted air strikes against Croat Serb air defense radars near Udbina airfield and Knin in Croatia. On 10 August, the Commanders of CINCSOUTH and UNPROFOR concluded a memorandum of understanding on the execution of air strikes.

On 11 August a USAF RQ-1 Predator drone was shot down by Serb forces over Krepšić, near Brčko. Another one was lost to a mechanical failure some days later.

== Campaign ==
On 30 August, the Secretary General of NATO announced the start of air strikes, supported by UNPROFOR rapid reaction force artillery attacks. Although planned and approved by the North Atlantic Council in July 1995, the operation was triggered in direct response to the second Markale massacre on 28 August 1995.

As many as 400 NATO aircraft participated in the air campaign. Overall, 3,515 sorties were flown and a total of 1,026 bombs were dropped on 338 Bosnian Serb targets located within 48 complexes. NATO aircraft struck 97% of their targets, and seriously damaged more than 80% of them. 708 of the bombs dropped were precision-guided munitions. In the air operation, the United States conducted 2,318 sorties, Great Britain 326, France 284, the Netherlands 198, Turkey 78, Germany 59, Italy 35 and Spain 13. The aircraft involved in the campaign operated from Italian air bases, such as Aviano Air Base, and from the US aircraft carriers USS Theodore Roosevelt and USS America, and French aircraft carriers Foch and Clemenceau in the Adriatic Sea. The VRS integrated air defence network, comprising aircraft and surface-to-air missiles, presented a high-threat environment to NATO air operations.

On 30 August, a French Mirage 2000N was shot down by a Bosnian Serb shoulder-fired 9K38 Igla near Pale. On 1 September, NATO and UN demanded the lifting of the Serbs' Siege of Sarajevo, removal of heavy weapons from the heavy weapons exclusion zone around Sarajevo, and complete security of other UN safe areas. NATO stopped the air raids and gave an ultimatum to Bosnian Serb leaders. The deadline was set as 4 September. On 5 September 1995, NATO resumed air attacks on Bosnian Serb positions around Sarajevo and near the Bosnian Serb headquarters at Pale after the Bosnian Serbs failed to comply with the ultimatum. The same day, Bosnian Serb forces in Herzegovina shot down a USAF MQ-1 Predator drone over Nevesinje. On the night of 10 September, the Ticonderoga-class cruiser USS Normandy launched a Tomahawk missile strike from the central Adriatic Sea against a key air defense radio relay tower at Lisina, near Banja Luka, while USAF F-15E and US Navy F/A-18 fighter-bombers hit the same targets with about a dozen precision-guided bombs, and F-16 jets attacked with Maverick missiles.

On 14 September, NATO air strikes were suspended to allow the implementation of an agreement with Bosnian Serbs to include the withdrawal of heavy weapons from the Sarajevo exclusion zone. The initial 72-hour suspension was eventually extended to 114 hours. Finally on 20 September, General Bernard Janvier and Admiral Leighton W. Smith, Jr. agreed that the resumption of air strikes was not necessary, as Bosnian Serbs had complied with the conditions set out by the UN, and so the operation was terminated.

=== Rapid Reaction Force ===
Frustrated by the previous absence of results and the resistance of the Serbian parties to any peace progress, the Western powers, led by French President Jacques Chirac, decided to put a deterrent force in-country to support western diplomatic efforts. France, the United Kingdom and the United States decided to send a multinational brigade to the Mount Igman area, supported by an airmobile brigade and an armored battalion in reserve. The Brigade consisted of 2000 French, 1500 British and 500 Dutch troops for a total of 4000 military personnel. The creation of the force was authorized by UNSC Resolution 998 on 16 June 1995.

Commanded by French General Andre Soubirou, the MN brigade was operational in August 1995 on Mount Igman. The main force consisted of a mixed artillery regiment, that being a French artillery group with eight 155 mm AUF1 howitzers, British artillery group with twelve 105 mm light guns, French and Dutch 120 mm Heavy Mortar company. Although the artillery fired before and after the Markale Market Massacre, the main action was on 28 and 29 August 1995, firing 1070 shells on Serbian positions, which were 305 155 mm shell, 408 120 mm shell, 357 105 mm shells. This artillery group was deployed at the UN base on Mount Igman to support the task of NATO's aircraft by pounding Serb artillery positions.

The German Luftwaffe saw action for the first time since 1945 during Operation Deliberate Force. Six interdictor-strike version Tornados, escorted by eight ECR Tornados, pinpointed Serb targets around Sarajevo for the Rapid Reaction Force artillery to attack. Netherlands and Turkiye participated in the operation with eighteen F-16As and eighteen F-16Cs, respectively.

== Aftermath ==
The two French airmen who were captured after their Mirage 2000N was downed by Bosnian Serb forces on 30 August 1995, Lt. Jose Souvignet and Capt. Frederic Chiffot, were released only upon the end of the Bosnian War, on 12 December 1995. Upon being released, they told reporters that they had been treated well while in captivity.

In December 1995, NATO dispatched a 60,000-strong peacekeeping force into Bosnia as part of the IFOR to enforce the Dayton Peace Agreement to secure peace and prevent renewed hostilities between three warring factions. In December 1996, the NATO-led SFOR was established to replace the IFOR to enforce the Dayton Peace Agreement. This lasted up until December 2004, when Operation Althea replaced the NATO-led SFOR.

== See also ==
- NATO bombing of Yugoslavia
