= Suada and Olga bridge =

Bridge over Miljacka in Sarajevo, Bosnia and Herzegovina

Suada and Olga Bridge
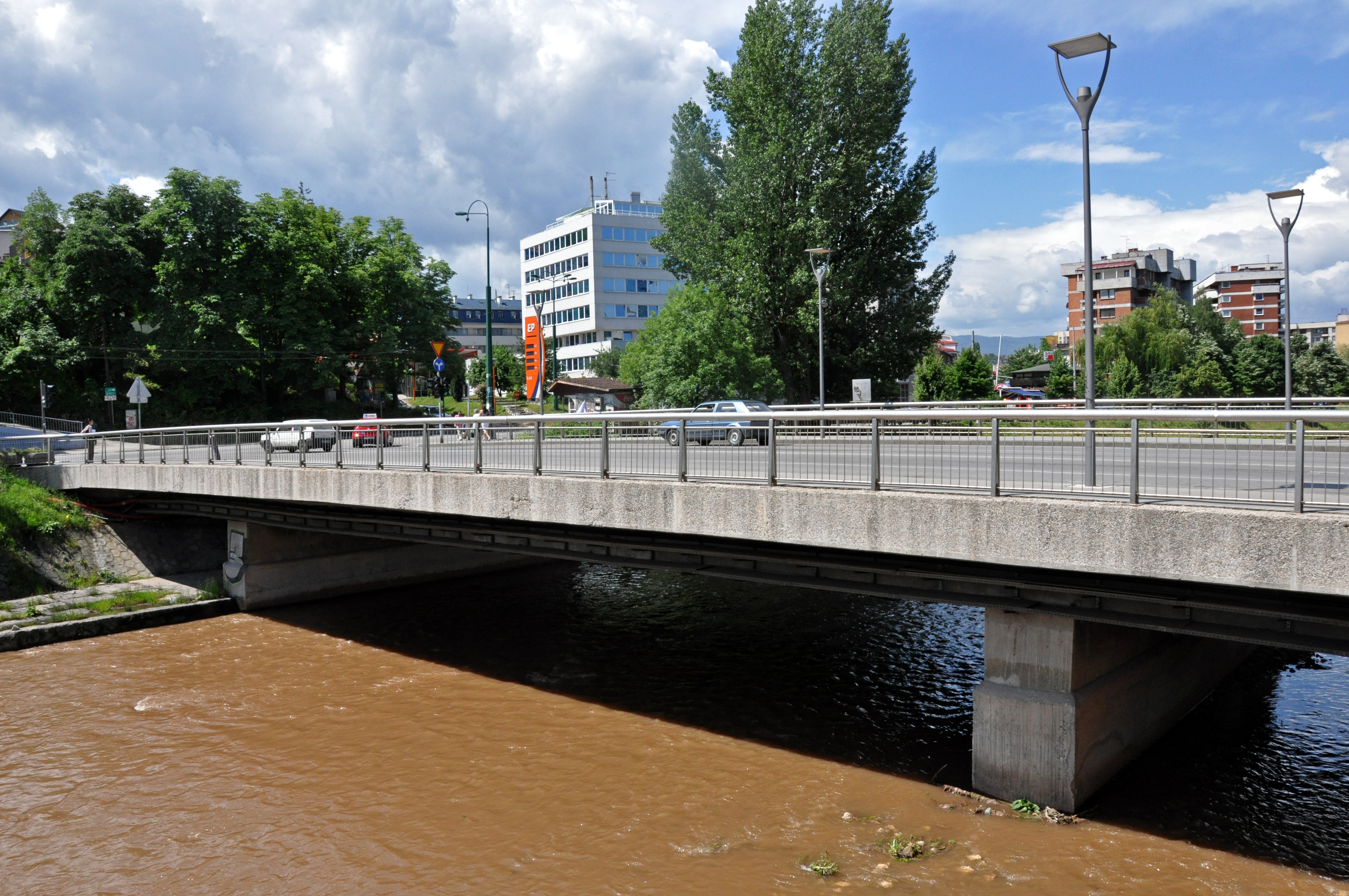
- Coordinates: 43°51′11.9″N 18°24′23.4″E
- Carries: Motor vehicles, pedestrians and bicycles
- Crosses: Miljacka
- Locale: Sarajevo, Bosnia and Herzegovina

Characteristics
- Total length: 42 m (138 ft)
- Width: 32 m (105 ft)

Location
- Interactive map of Suada and Olga Bridge

Suada and Olga Bridge (Bosnian, Croatian and Serbian: Most Suade i Olge / Мост Суаде и Олге), also known by its old name Vrbanja Bridge (Vrbanja most / Врбања мост), is a bridge across the Miljacka river in Sarajevo, the capital of Bosnia and Herzegovina.

== Name ==
The oldest name of this bridge is Ćirišhana bridge, named after Turkish word for glue factory, which was located near the bridge on the right side of the river. During the Yugoslavian-era, the name of the bridge was "Vrbanja bridge".

Following the Siege of Sarajevo, on 6 April 1996 it was renamed first to "Suada Dilberović bridge", after which on 3 December, 1999 it was renamed to the-now "Suada and Olga bridge". It is named after Suada Dilberović and Olga Sučić, the first victims shot by the Bosnian Serb's Democratic Party militia at the beginning of the Siege of Sarajevo, while a group of civilians were peacefully demonstrating.

== History ==
On 19 May 1993, the couple Admira Ismić and Boško Brkić, a Bosniak and a Bosnian Serb, were also shot while trying to cross the bridge, which was the subject of the 1994 documentary Romeo and Juliet in Sarajevo, inspired by a piece of Kurt Schork. In 1995 it was the site of the battle of Vrbanja Bridge between French Troupes de Marine of the United Nations Protection Force and militiamen from the Army of Republika Srpska.

== In popular culture ==
- Up with People - sang the song "Last Embrace", inspired by Bosko and Admira's story as part of their show The Festival
- Bill Madden - "Bosko and Admira", from the 2008 album Child of the Same God
- Jill Sobule - "Vrbana Bridge"
- "薩拉熱窩的羅密歐與茱麗葉", exact translation in Cantonese of "Romeo and Juliet in Sarajevo", from Hong Kong singer Sammi Cheng's 1994 album Ten Commandments
- Watsky - released the song "Sarajevo (ft Dia Frampton) August 12, 2014 on the album All You Can Do
