= Scott O'Grady =

American politician; former U.S. Air Force fighter pilot

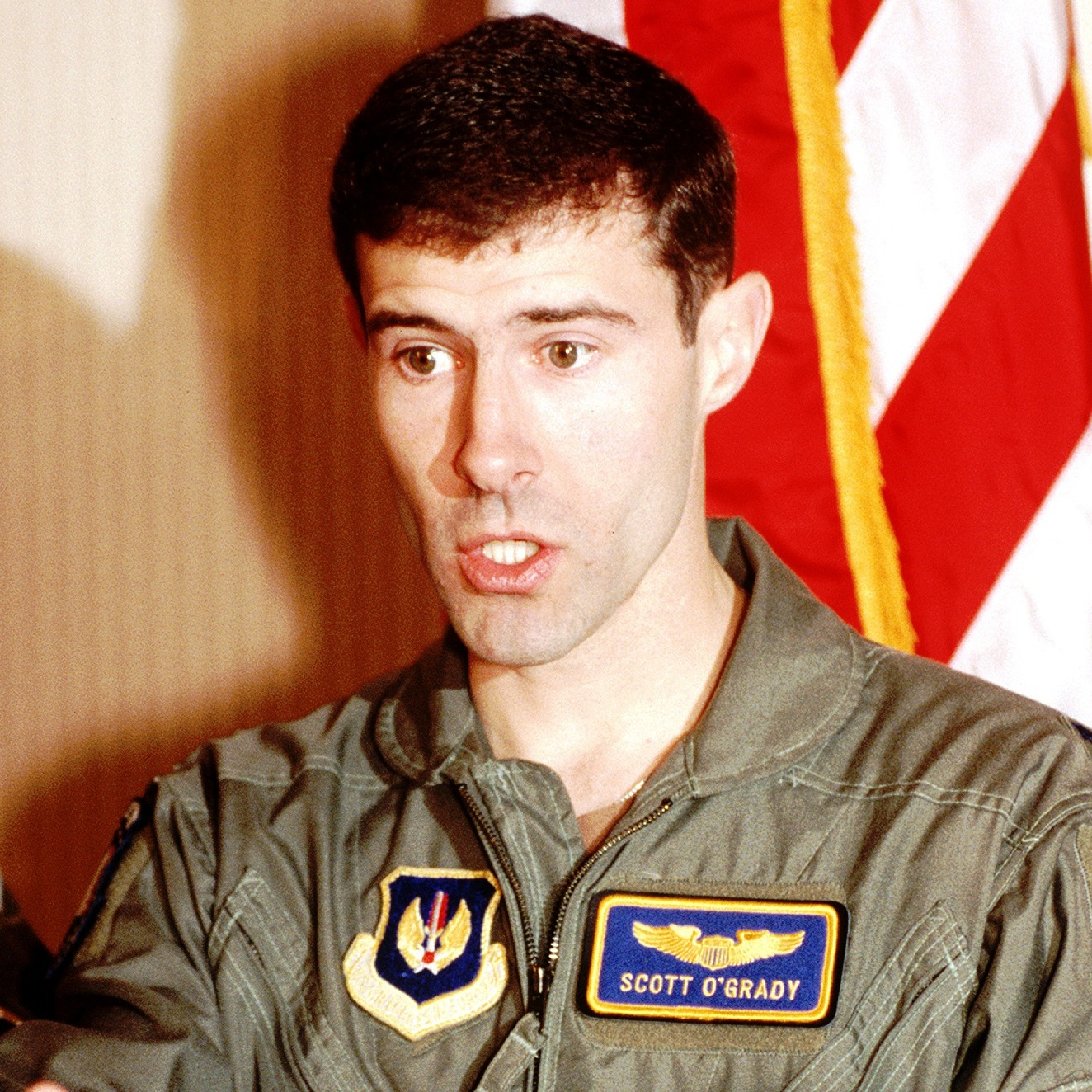
- O'Grady in 1995
- Born: Scott Francis O'Grady; October 12, 1965 (age 61); New York City, New York, U.S.
- Military career
- Allegiance: United States
- Branch: United States Air Force
- Service years: 1989–2001
- Rank: Captain
- Nickname: "Basher 52"
- Conflicts: Bosnian War; Banja Luka incident
- Other work: Joint author of Return With Honor, and Basher Five-Two, speaker

Scott Francis O'Grady (born October 12, 1965) is a former United States Air Force (USAF) fighter pilot. On June 2, 1995, he was shot down over Bosnia and Herzegovina by a 2K12 Kub (NATO designation SA-6 "Gainful") mobile surface-to-air missile (SAM) and forced to eject from his F-16C into hostile territory. US Marines from heavy-helicopter squadron HMH-464 and the 24th Marine Expeditionary Unit (Note: "on AC number 21") eventually rescued O'Grady after six days of evading the Bosnian Serbs. In February 1994 he had unsuccessfully engaged Serb ground attack aircraft that had violated the NATO-enforced Operation Deny Flight no-fly zone over Bosnia and Herzegovina. The 2001 film Behind Enemy Lines is loosely based on his experience of being shot down and rescued.

In September 2011, O'Grady announced a run for the 2012 Republican nomination for Texas State Senate District 8 seat, held at the time by the retiring Republican Florence Shapiro. In January 2012, he suspended his campaign "due to the uncertainty of a primary election date from redistricting." In November 2020, President Donald Trump stated an official intention to nominate O'Grady as the next Assistant Secretary of Defense for International Security Affairs. The nomination was submitted to the Senate for confirmation on November 30, 2020. Before and during the nomination, O'Grady had spread numerous disproved conspiracy theories regarding the 2020 United States presidential election and calls by Michael Flynn for Trump to institute martial law.

== Career ==
=== NATO: Operation Deny Flight ===
The Bosnian War was an international armed conflict that took place in Bosnia and Herzegovina between April 1992 and December 1995. The North Atlantic Treaty Organization (NATO) decided to intervene in the Bosnian War after allegations of war crimes against civilians were made by various media organizations. NATO military involvement primarily involved enforcement of a no-fly zone codenamed Operation Deny Flight to discourage Bosnian Serb military aircraft from attacking Bosnian government and Bosnian Croat forces. In February 1994, O'Grady was involved in the Banja Luka incident where he, along with several other F-16 pilots, engaged Bosnian Serb jets who were in violation of the no-fly zone. Later, as part of the 555th Fighter Squadron based at Aviano Air Base, Italy, he was piloting one of two F-16s patrolling the skies above Bosnia on June 2, 1995.

==== Shootdown ====
On the ground, a Bosnian Serb army 2K12 Kub surface-to-air missile battery near Mrkonjić Grad was readying to fire its missiles on NATO aircraft. These Serbs had moved the mobile-tracked missile battery and laid a trap. They switched on their missile radars intermittently, giving F-16 fighters little warning. Waiting until a plane was directly overhead, where the aircraft's warning and countermeasures would be at their weakest, they fired two missiles. In the cockpit, O'Grady's instruments alerted him that a missile was coming, but, because he was flying through an overcast sky, he could not see it. The first missile exploded between the two aircraft. The second struck the F-16 piloted by O'Grady. His flight lead, Captain Robert Gordon "Wilbur" Wright, saw O'Grady's plane burst into flames and break in two. Wright did not see a parachute, but O'Grady survived by ejecting from the aircraft.

O'Grady landed among a Bosnian Serb population that he was briefed would be unfriendly. He quickly secured a 29-pound (13 kg) survival bag, ran, and hid. Rubbing dirt on his face, he hid face-down as Bosnian Serb forces came upon his parachute, half a dozen times shooting their rifles only feet from where he was hidden in an effort to flush him out or kill him.

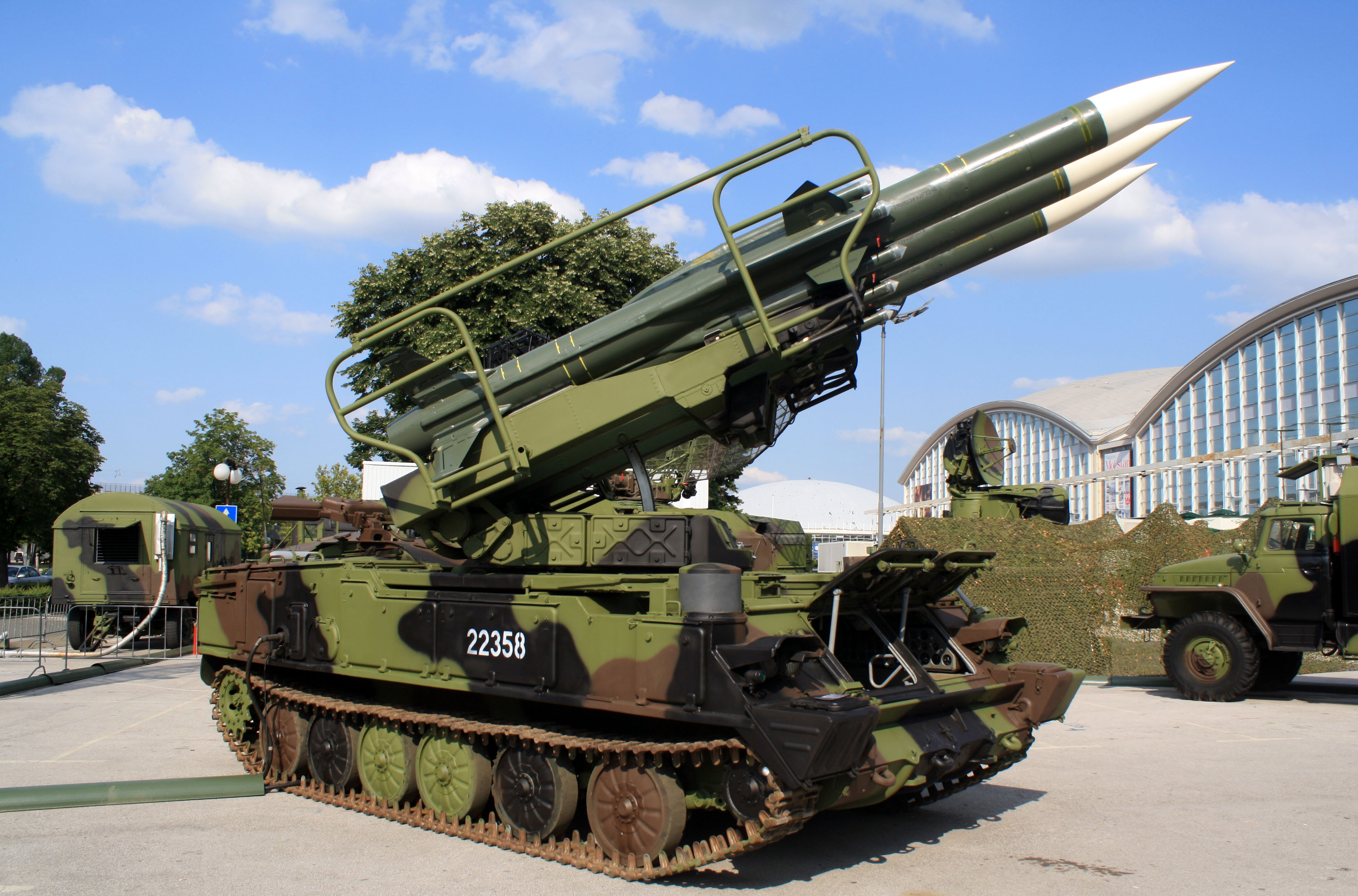
2K12 Kub of the Serbian Armed Forces similar to one used by Bosnian Serbs

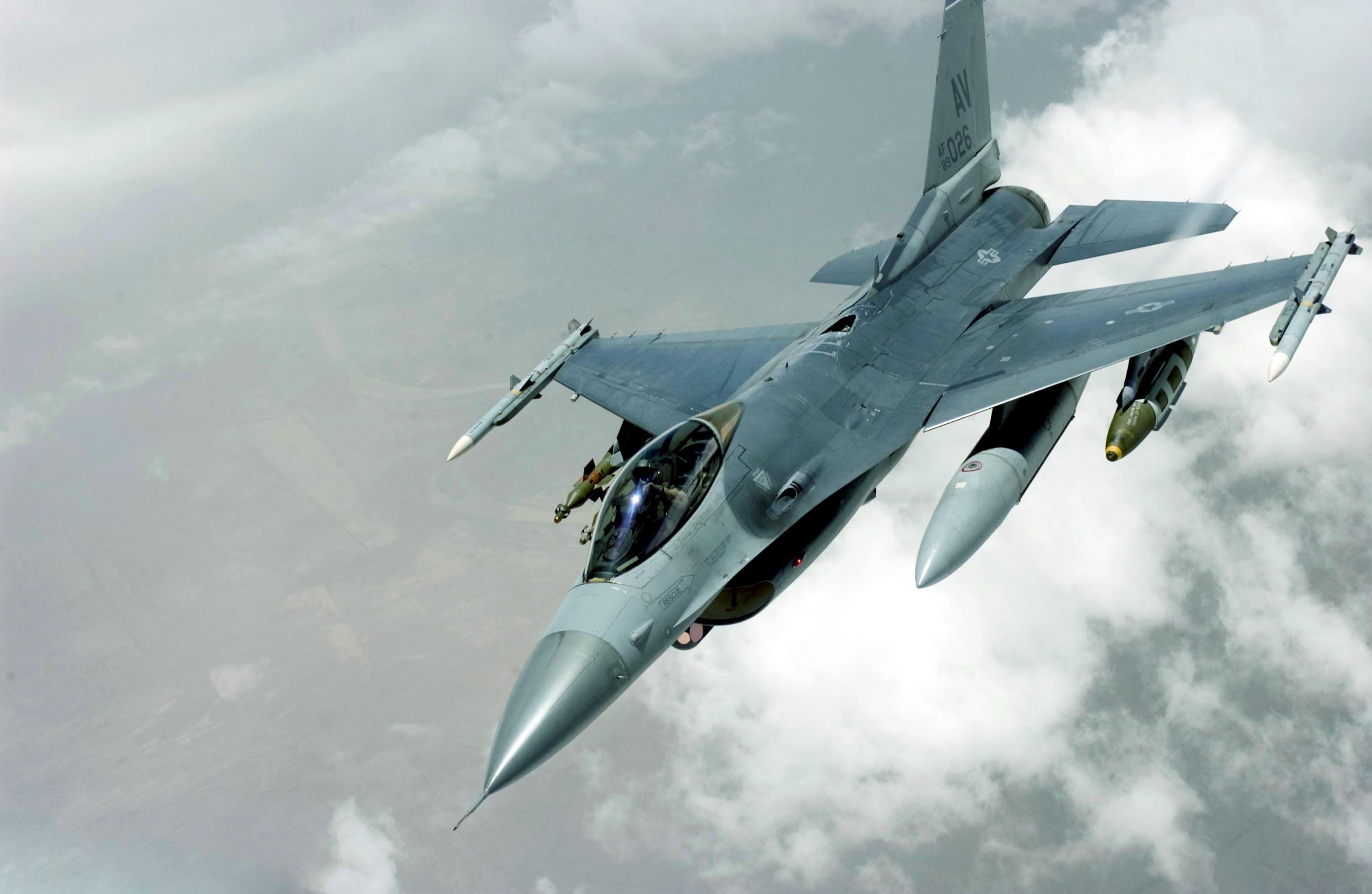
F-16C of the 555th Fighter Squadron based at Aviano Air Base, Italy.

During the next six days, he put to use the lessons learned during a 17-day Survival, Evasion, Resistance and Escape (SERE) training session he had undertaken at Fairchild Air Force Base near his hometown of Spokane, Washington. He ate leaves, grass, and bugs, and stored the little rainwater he could collect with a sponge in plastic bags.

O'Grady radioed for help immediately but had to remain quiet with paramilitaries coming within feet of him; he used the radio following standard operating procedures as the U.S. Air Force had taught him so as not to give away his position to unfriendly forces. On his 6th night on the ground he made radio contact, signalling his location using his radio's limited battery power. NATO warplanes conducting sorties in the Balkans had been picking up distress beacon snippets that they thought could be coming from O'Grady. This extremely sensitive information was inadvertently revealed by General Ronald Fogleman, the Air Force Chief of Staff, when the general told reporters attending a promotion ceremony that monitors had detected "intermittent" transmissions. A NATO official was quoted as saying "I was dumbfounded he said that... I mean, why not just announce to the bad guys, 'We think he's alive and kicking, and we hope we find him before you do'?"

==== Rescue ====
Just after midnight on June 8, O'Grady spoke into the radio. An F-16 pilot, Captain Thomas "T.O." Hanford, from the 510th responded and, after confirming his identity, the rescue was set in motion. At 0440 local time, USAF General Michael Ryan and Navy Admiral Leighton Smith, commander of NATO Southern Forces, called US Marine Corps Colonel Martin Berndt aboard USS Kearsarge with orders to "execute".

Two CH-53 Sea Stallions with 51 Marines from the 3rd Battalion, 8th Marines within the 24th Marine Expeditionary Unit lifted off USS Kearsarge to rescue the pilot. The two helicopters were accompanied by two Marine Corps AH-1W Supercobra helicopter gunships and a pair of Marine Corps AV-8B Harrier jump jets, one piloted by Captain Ronald C. Walkerwicz. These six aircraft had support from identical sets of replacement helicopters and jump jets as well as two Navy EA-6B Prowler electronic warfare planes, two Air Force EF-111A Raven electronic warfare planes, two Marine F/A-18D Hornets, a pair of anti-tank Air Force A-10 Thunderbolts, an SH-60B from USS Ticonderoga, and an RAF AWACS E-3D.

At 0635, the helicopters approached the area where O'Grady's signal beacon had been traced. The pilots saw bright yellow smoke coming from trees near a rocky pasture where O'Grady had set off a flare. The first Sea Stallion, commanded by Major William Tarbutton, touched down and 20 Marines jumped off the aircraft and set up a defensive perimeter. As the second Sea Stallion, commanded by Captains Paul Fortunato and James Wright, landed, a figure with a pistol who turned out to be the missing pilot appeared running towards the Marines and immediately went to the Sea Stallion. As the side door opened, he was pulled in before the second 20 Marines poised to leave by the rear ramp could even move. They were called back to their seats, and those who had formed the defensive perimeter reboarded the other helicopter. After a quick head count, the Stallions took off. They had been on the ground no more than seven minutes.

==== Return ====
The Marines, with O'Grady, flew low over Serb-held Bosnia. However, American aircraft detected a Serb missile radar along the Croatian coast, scanning for targets. An American plane recommended destroying the Serb radar, code-named Giraffe. The request was denied, partly out of concern that a strike could spark wider conflict.

Minutes later, the Marines reported they were under fire. Three shoulder-launched surface-to-air missiles had been fired at them but missed, as the helicopter pilots—flying 150 feet (46 m) off the ground at 175 mph (282 km/h)—jinked to evade them. Serb small arms pocked both helicopters; the Marines aboard heard the bullets hit inside the fuselage. One door gunner returned fire. One round hit some communication gear in the chopper and hitting Sergeant Major Angel Castro Jr.'s armor without injuring anyone. At 0715 local time, 30 minutes after picking up O'Grady, the rescuers reported "feet wet", meaning they were over water. O'Grady was back aboard the Kearsarge at 0730. All of the aircraft landed without further incident.

==== Aftermath ====
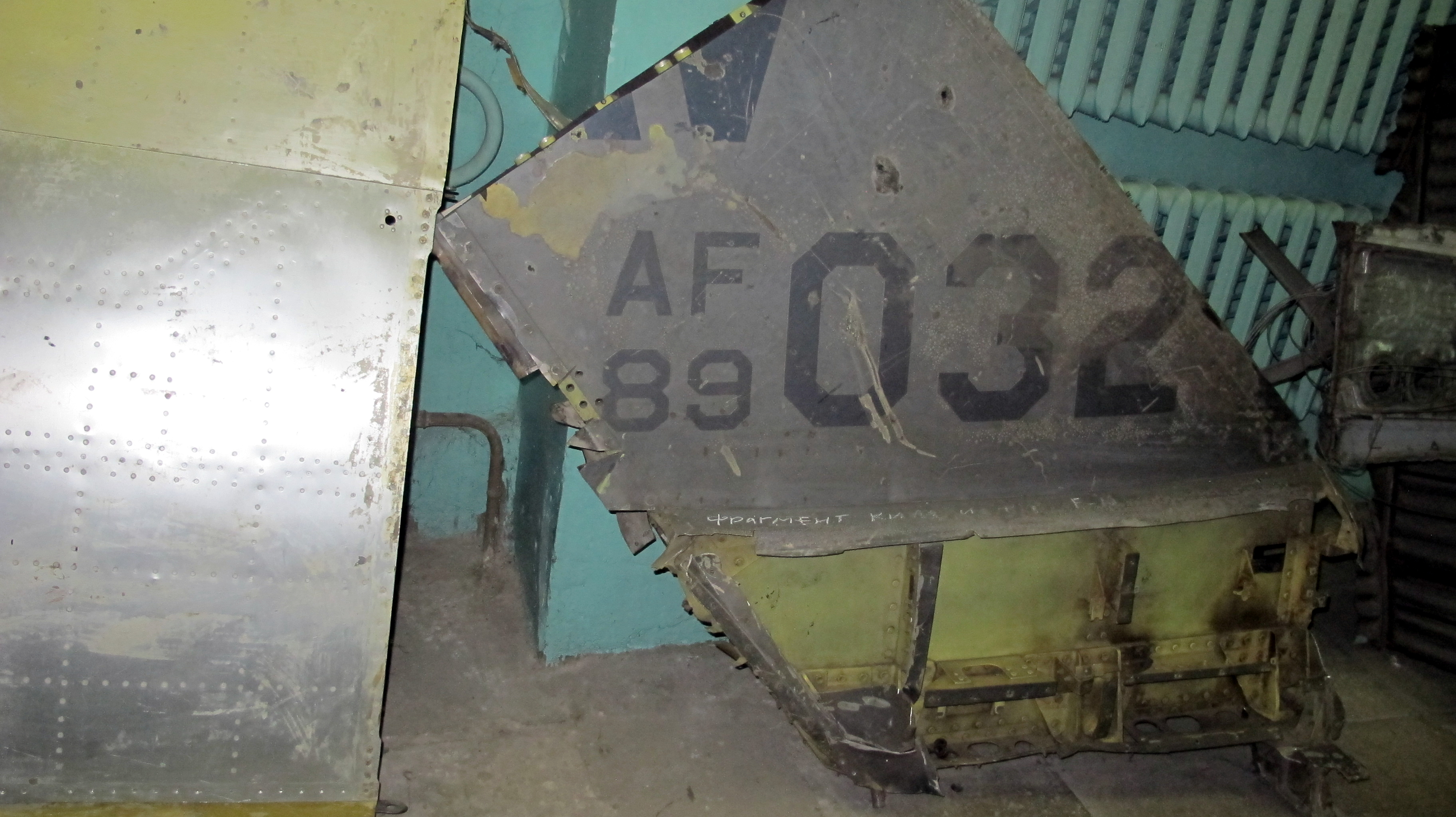
The fin structure from Scott O'Grady's F-16 on display in the museum of the Moscow Aviation Institute

On August 11, 1995, a USAF RQ-1 Predator drone was shot down by Serb forces in the same area. The Serbs recovered the wreckage and handed it over to Russia for technical evaluation. On August 30, NATO launched Operation Deliberate Force, a massive airstrike campaign which eventually lifted the siege of Sarajevo and led to the end of the war in Bosnia.

O'Grady received a Bronze Star and Purple Heart for this mission.

=== Nomination: Assistant Secretary of Defense for International Security Affairs ===
In November 2020, President Donald Trump announced his intent to nominate O'Grady to be an Assistant Secretary of Defense (International Security Affairs). The President justified this intent to appoint by citing O'Grady's combat experience, his book Return With Honor, and Master's degree in Theology from Dallas Theological Seminary and Honorary Doctorate of Public Service from the University of Portland in Oregon.

Shortly before and during the nomination period, O'Grady retweeted Twitter posts that promoted conspiracy-theories about the 2020 United States presidential election, including claims that Trump won the election in a "landslide fashion", that millions of votes were "stolen from [Trump]", and that Hillary Clinton and George Soros were involved in helping foreign agents interfere in the election. Additionally, O'Grady "signaled support" for conspiracy theories by Sidney Powell, alleging an international conspiracy of politicians, CIA agents, communists, and deceased former president of Venezuela Hugo Chavez working with Dominion Voting Systems to rig the election for Biden; retweeted attacks calling former Defense Secretary James Mattis a "traitor"; and endorsed a petition allegedly shared by former national security advisor Michael Flynn which recommended Trump declare martial law to overturn the election.

On January 3, 2021, his nomination was returned to the President under Rule XXXI, Paragraph 6 of the United States Senate. The rule specifies that if final action has not been taken before Congress adjourns, the nomination returns to the president.

=== Defense Policy Board ===
On December 14, 2020, the Department of Defense announced that the Trump administration nominated O'Grady to the Defense Policy Board, as a part of a slate of replacement nominations for the 11 board members who were abruptly fired in November 2020. O'Grady was sworn in as the board member on January 19, 2021, the last full day of Trump's presidency, under pressure from the White House to complete his and other similar nominations. Following the election of President Joe Biden, Defense Secretary Lloyd Austin ordered a "zero-based review" of all the Pentagon advisory boards and fired all of the members appointed by the DoD, including all the Defense Policy Board members, effective February 16, 2021.

== Personal life ==
O'Grady was born in Brooklyn, New York City, a son of William P. O'Grady and Mary Lou Scardapane, and graduated from Lewis and Clark High School in Spokane, Washington. He is a former cadet in the Civil Air Patrol and a 1989 Air Force ROTC graduate from Embry-Riddle Aeronautical University's campus in Prescott, Arizona. After his rescue, O'Grady transferred from active duty in the regular U.S. Air Force to the Air Force Reserve, where he continued to fly the F-16. In May 2007, he completed a master's degree in biblical studies at Dallas Theological Seminary in Dallas, Texas. He resides in Frisco in Collin County, Texas.

O'Grady is an active Republican, having spoken at the 1996 Republican convention in support of Bob Dole. In 2004, O'Grady, supporting George W. Bush for re-election, accused Bush's opponent John Kerry of "treason" for actions taken during the Vietnam War. O'Grady endorsed Brian Birdwell in his successful 2010 bid for the Texas State Senate, then launched his own candidacy for the Texas state house in September 2011, seeking the 2012 Republican nomination in Senate District 8 following the retirement of Sen. Florence Shapiro. O'Grady dropped out of the race in early 2012, claiming Shapiro had reneged on a promise to support him in the Republican primary, while his opponent had numerous endorsements.

== In popular culture ==
The shootdown incident was depicted and described on the documentary television program Situation Critical in episode No. 5, "Downed Pilot". This has been shown on the National Geographic Channel. It was also covered in "Escape! – Escape From Bosnia: The Scott O'Grady Story" on the History Channel. The BBC also made a documentary, titled "Missing in Action", that was later purchased by 20th Century Fox and Discovery Communications.

The 2001 film Behind Enemy Lines, starring Gene Hackman and Owen Wilson, is loosely based on this event. Although O'Grady had given the film a positive rating on the film review television show Hot Or Not, O'Grady took offense at the portrayal of 'his' character in Behind Enemy Lines "as a pilot who disobeys orders and swears". O'Grady sued 20th Century Fox in 2002 for falsely misleading the public that the film was true to life. He also took action over the documentary, Behind Enemy Lines: The Scott O'Grady Story, which was a re-edited version of a BBC documentary which Discovery Communications, parent company of the Discovery Channel, had purchased and edited. The documentary was broadcast several times on the Discovery Channel, and O'Grady accused Fox of using it to promote the film. Both suits were settled in 2004. Fox made a confidential settlement with O'Grady, while a Texas court ruled against O'Grady and in favor of Discovery Communications. The judge's ruling stated, in effect, that the events in a person's life are not the same thing as that person's likeness or image.

O'Grady co-wrote two books, collaborating on one, with Michael French, that detailed his experiences of being shot down over Bosnia and his eventual rescue, Basher Five-Two: The True Story of F-16 Fighter Pilot Captain Scott O'Grady. He first wrote a book that was a New York Times Bestseller about his experience in Return with Honor with Jeff Coplon. Another book has also been written; this one, "Good To Go:" The Rescue of Capt. Scott O'Grady, USAF, from Bosnia, was written by Mary Pat Kelly.

== Bibliography ==
- O'Grady, Scott; Coplon, Jeff (1995). Return with Honor. New York: Doubleday. ISBN 0-385-48330-9. OCLC 260203342.
- O'Grady, Scott; French, Michael (1995). Basher Five-Two: The True Story of F-16 Fighter Pilot Captain Scott O'Grady. New York: Doubleday. ISBN 0-385-32300-X. OCLC 39659863.
- Kelly, Mary Pat (1996). "Good to Go": The Rescue of Capt. Scott O'Grady, USAF, From Bosnia. Annapolis, MD: Naval Institute Press. ISBN 1-55750-459-8. OCLC 34410723.
