= Leighton W. Smith Jr. =

United States Navy admiral

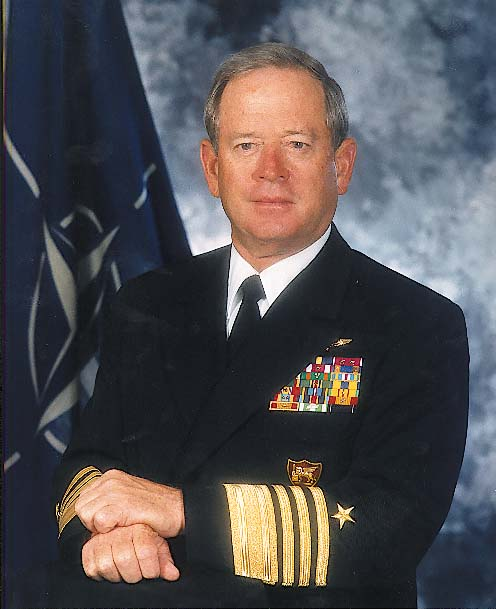
- Born: August 20, 1939; Mobile, Alabama, U.S.
- Died: November 28, 2023 (aged 84)
- Military career
- Allegiance: United States
- Branch: United States Navy
- Service years: 1962–1996
- Rank: Admiral
- Nickname: "Snuffy"
- Commands: Allied Forces Southern Europe; United States Naval Forces Europe; Implementation Force; Carrier Group 6 USS America (CV-66); USS Kalamazoo (AOR-6)
- Conflicts: Vietnam War; United States invasion of Panama; Bosnian War: Operation Deny Flight; Operation Deliberate Force
- Awards: Defense Distinguished Service Medal (2); Navy Distinguished Service Medal; Legion of Merit (3); Distinguished Flying Cross (2); Honorary Knight Commander of the Order of the British Empire

Leighton Warren Smith Jr. USN (20 August 1939 – 28 November 2023) was a former United States Navy admiral. In 1994, he became the Commander in Chief of United States Naval Forces Europe and Allied Forces Southern Europe, commands he would hold during the height of the Yugoslav wars. He commanded the NATO enacted no-fly zone (Operation Deny Flight) over Bosnia and the later bombing campaign against Republika Srpska (Operation Deliberate Force) in 1995. In 1995, he also took commanded the NATO-led Implementation Force (IFOR) in Bosnia, with the objective of overseeing the Dayton Agreement. He held all three positions until his retirement in 1996.

== Early life and education ==
Smith was born in Mobile, Alabama, on August 20, 1939, and graduated from the United States Naval Academy with the Class of 1962. He received his wings in January 1964.

== Naval career ==
As a naval aviator, Smith flew carrier-based A-4 Skyhawk and A-7 Corsair II light attack jet aircraft during multiple deployments to the Mediterranean, North Atlantic, Western Pacific and Indian Oceans. These included three cruises in waters off North Vietnam where he flew over 280 combat missions, primarily in the A-7 Corsair II. Smith held command at sea in the aviation community at squadron and wing levels as well as major commands that included a deep draft vessel, the USS Kalamazoo (AOR-6), before taking command of the aircraft carrier USS America (CV-66) and subsequent command of Carrier Group 6 in 1986 as a flag officer. He has logged over 4,200 flying hours and accumulated over 1000 carrier arrested landings.

=== Commands ===
Smith's early flag officer tours were Director for Operations, United States European Command (1989–1991) and Deputy Chief of Naval Operations for Plans, Policy and Operations (1991–1994). Appointed to four-star rank in April 1994, he became Commander in Chief, United States Naval Forces Europe and concurrent NATO Commander in Chief Allied Forces Southern Europe (1994–1996). In December 1995, he assumed, concurrently, command of the NATO-led Implementation Force (IFOR) in Bosnia, a position he held until August 1996.

Smith's IFOR command in Bosnia was criticized by Richard Holbrooke for his refusal to use his authority to also perform nonmilitary implementation tasks, including arresting indicted war criminals:

Based on Shalikashvili's statement at White House meetings, Christopher and I had assumed that the IFOR commander would use his authority to do substantially more than he was obligated to do. The meeting with Smith shattered that hope. Smith and his British deputy, General Michael Walker, made clear that they intended to take a minimalist approach to all aspects of implementation other than force protection. Smith signaled this in his first extensive public statement to the Bosnian people, during a live call-in program on Pale Television — an odd choice for his first local media appearance. During the program, he answered a question in a manner that dangerously narrowed his own authority. He later told Newsweek about it with a curious pride.

One of the questions I was asked was, "Admiral, is it true that IFOR is going to arrest Serbs in the Serb suburbs of Sarajevo?" I said, "Absolutely not, I don't have the authority to arrest anybody."

This was an inaccurate way to describe IFOR's mandate. It was true IFOR was not supposed to make routine arrests of ordinary citizens. But IFOR had the authority to arrest indicted war criminals, and could also detain anyone who posed a threat to its forces. Knowing what the question meant, Smith had sent an unfortunate signal of reassurance to Karadžić – over his own network.

== Later work ==
Smith retired from the US Navy on 1 October 1996. He served as a Senior Fellow at the Center for Naval Analyses, was President of Leighton Smith Associates and Vice President of Global Perspectives, Inc., both international consulting firms. He was Chairman of the Naval Aviation Museum Foundation, immediate past Chairman of the Board of Trustees of the United States Naval Academy Alumni Association and served on the Executive Committee of the Association of Naval Aviation. He was also on the National Advisory Council to the Navy League and was a member of the Board of Directors of several corporations.

Smith was a supporter of the John McCain 2008 presidential campaign before the 2008 election. Smith spoke out in defense of McCain after critical comments from General Wesley Clark regarding McCain's military experience. Prior to his retirement, Smith had previously served alongside General Clark for several years during the war in Bosnia and Herzegovina.

Smith has been one of the senior signatories of the March 31, 2009 letter urging the president to maintain the policy excluding homosexuals from the armed forces.

== Death ==
Smith died at his home in Pinehurst, N.C. on November 28, 2023.

== Awards and decorations ==

Naval Aviator Badge
Defense Distinguished Service Medal with oak leaf cluster
Navy Distinguished Service Medal	Legion of Merit with three gold award stars	Distinguished Flying Cross with award star
Meritorious Service Medal with award star	Air Medal with gold award numeral 4 and bronze Strike/flight numerals 25	Navy and Marine Corps Commendation Medal with Combat V and two award stars
Navy and Marine Corps Achievement Medal with Combat V	Joint Meritorious Unit Award	Navy Unit Commendation
Navy Meritorious Unit Commendation with one bronze service star	Navy Expeditionary Medal	National Defense Service Medal with service star
Armed Forces Expeditionary Medal	Vietnam Service Medal with silver service star	Navy Sea Service Deployment Ribbon with two service stars
Navy & Marine Corps Overseas Service Ribbon	Vietnam Gallantry Cross with gold star	Order of Merit of the Republic of Hungary (Military), Grand Cross
French Order of National Merit, Grand Officer	Honorary Knight Commander of the Order of the British Empire (invested personally by Her Majesty Queen Elizabeth II of the United Kingdom)	Vietnam Gallantry Cross Unit Citation
NATO Medal for the former Yugoslavia	Vietnam Campaign Medal	Navy Pistol Marksmanship Ribbon
Allied Forces Southern Europe
