= 1994 Serb J-21 Jastreb shootdown =

Incident in which five Croatian/Bosnian Serb aircraft were shot down by NATO aircraft

- Part of Operation Deny Flight
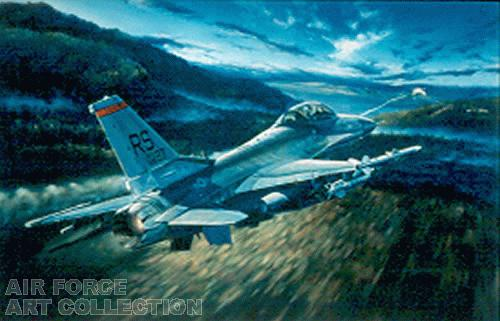
- Artist's depiction of the incident
Date	28 February 1994
Location	Southwest of Banja Luka, Bosnia and Herzegovina 44°32′8.54″N 16°34′57.42″E
Result	NATO victory

Belligerents
Republika Srpska; Serbian Krajina	NATO

Strength
6 J-21 Jastrebs; 2 J-22 Oraos	4 F-16s

Casualties and losses
3 pilots killed 5 Jastrebs destroyed 1 Jastreb damaged	None

On 28 February 1994, two pairs of North Atlantic Treaty Organisation (NATO) General Dynamics F-16C Fighting Falcon aircraft shot down five J-21 Jastreb single-seat light attack jets–piloted by Republika Srpska (RS) or Republic of Serbian Krajina (RSK) personnel–in Bosnia and Herzegovina airspace after they had bombed an armaments factory at Novi Travnik during the Bosnian War. The interception was part of NATO's Operation Deny Flight, with the shootdown constituting the first combat action in the alliance's history.

About 06:00, six J-21s flew from Udbina air base in the self-proclaimed Croatian Serb proto-state within Croatia known as the RSK. Two Soko J-22 Orao ground attack aircraft were also involved in the attack, but their target was an arms factory at Bugojno and they completed their mission and returned to Udbina unscathed. The pilots were a mix of RS and RSK air force personnel. A British airborne warning and control system (AWACS) aircraft detected the aircraft and, after their warning was ignored, tasked a pair of United States Air Force (USAF) F-16C Fighting Falcons on combat air patrol (CAP) to intercept. The fighters issued a further warning, and when it was ignored and the J-21s dropped their bombs, the F-16Cs engaged the aircraft as they fled for the Croatian border. One US pilot claimed three aircraft shot down, and when the first pair of F-16Cs departed to refuel, a second pair of F-16Cs engaged, shooting down another J-21. According to RS/RSK records, a fifth J-21 was also lost. Three pilots were killed and two ejected safely. The single surviving J-21 was badly damaged and conducted an emergency landing at Udbina. The three surviving pilots were later decorated.

The shootdown showed the effectiveness of the NATO response, and was the sole example of fixed-wing aircraft being shot down by NATO during Operation Deny Flight. No more direct challenges by fixed-wing aircraft were made during the operation, but the RS and RSK conducted a few short raids into Bosnia from Udbina during the balance of 1994 before the airbase was struck by NATO in late November. In June of the following year, one of the US pilots involved in the shootdown was himself shot down by a Serb RS surface-to-air missile over Mrkonjić Grad. He ejected and was rescued by US forces.

== Background ==
Operation Deny Flight was a NATO operation in the airspace over Bosnia and Herzegovina. It conducted aerial monitoring and enforced compliance with a "no-fly zone" and provided close air support to United Nations (UN) peacekeeping forces mandated by the United Nations Security Council. It also conducted, after request by and in coordination with the UN, approved air strikes against designated targets threatening the security of the UN-declared safe areas. It commenced on 12 April 1993, and was implemented by NATO Allied Forces Southern Europe (AFSOUTH) headquartered in Naples, Italy. Control of the operation was delegated to the Commander of Allied Air Forces Southern Europe (COMAIRSOUTH), and operational control of day-to-day mission tasking was delegated to the Commander, 5th Allied Tactical Air Force (5th ATAF), headquartered at Vicenza, Italy.

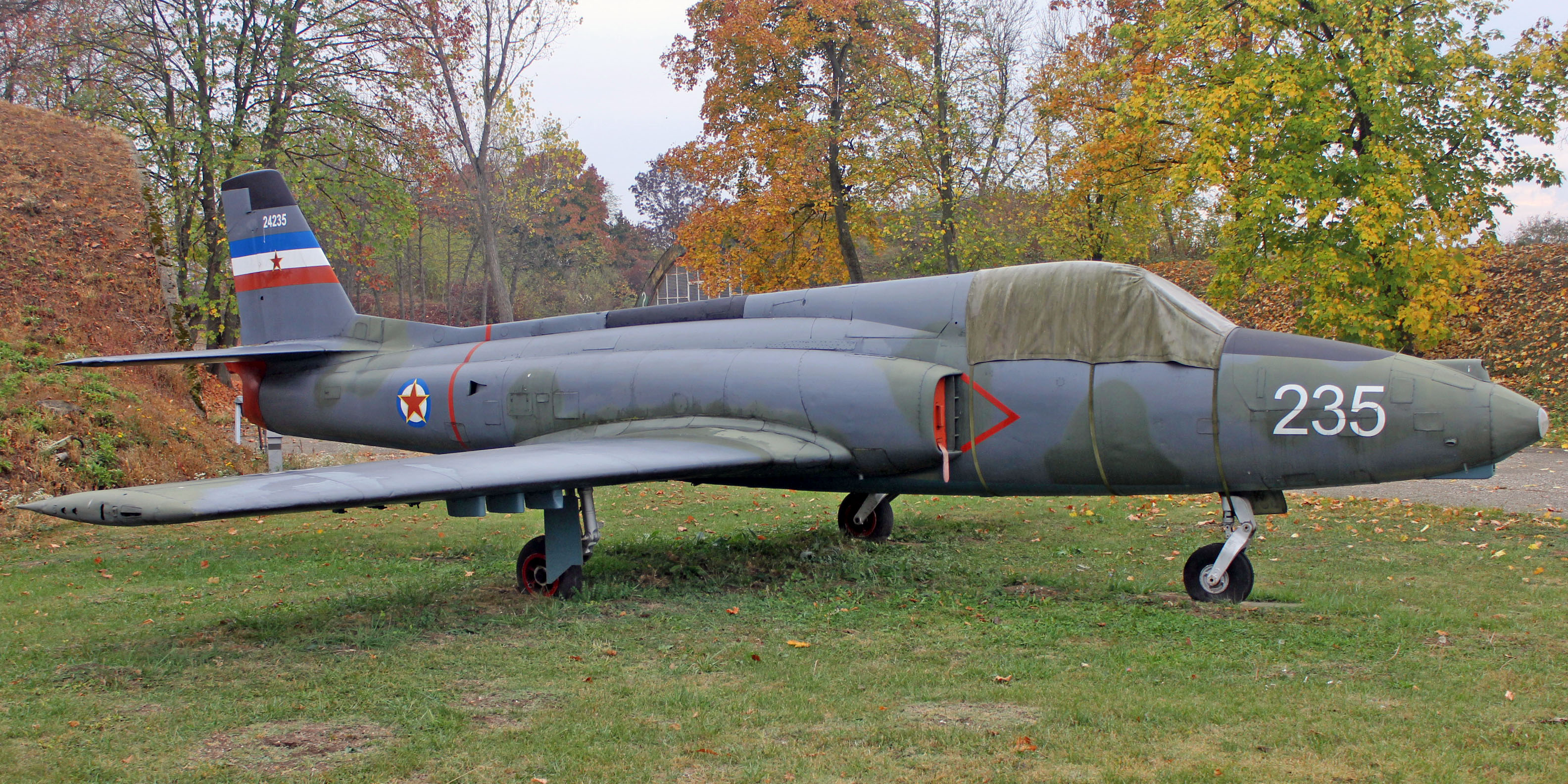
A J-21 Jastreb light attack jet on display at the Lađevci air base in Serbia

The no-fly zone did not extend to the territory of neighbouring Croatia, where a significant part of the country–mainly along the western border of Bosnia and Herzegovina–was controlled by the self-proclaimed Croatian Serb proto-state known as the Republic of Serbian Krajina (RSK). The RSK had a small air force operating from the former Yugoslav Air Force base at Udbina. In autumn 1993, the rump Federal Republic of Yugoslavia (FRY) donated a batch of J-21 Jastreb single-seat light attack jets to the RSK air force, transporting the disassembled aircraft by road from Serbia and assembling them at Udbina. These aircraft were used to form the 249th Fighter-Bomber Aviation Squadron. There was close cooperation between the RSK air force and the air force of the self-proclaimed proto-state within Bosnia and Herzegovina known as Republika Srpska (RS). Calls to further reinforce the RSK air force led to another 14 J-21s being donated to the RSK air force by the FRY before the end of 1993. The RS air force had earlier transferred some of its other air assets, including some Soko J-22 Orao ground attack aircraft, to Udbina. The close cooperation between the two air forces included the training of RS air force pilots at Udbina, allowing them to maintain their flight proficiency in Croatian airspace. None of the Jastrebs had working radar warning receivers.

On 5 February 1994, the 526th Fighter Squadron of the 86th Fighter Wing of the USAF was transferred from Ramstein Air Base in Germany to Aviano Air Base in Italy to take part in Operation Deny Flight. The squadron was equipped with General Dynamics F-16C Fighting Falcons.

== Air strike, detection and engagement ==
Early on 27 February 1994, six pilots from the 92nd Brigade of the RS air force, including the brigade commander, Lieutenant Colonel Zvezdan Pešić, were transferred from Banja Luka to Udbina for a mission. They were joined by two RSK air force pilots. The briefing was conducted by staff from both the RS and RSK air forces. The mission involved two attacks on Army of the Republic of Bosnia and Herzegovina (ARBiH) armament factories located in towns in central Bosnia. One attack was to be conducted by six J-21 Jastreb aircraft on the MMK Bratstvo arms factory at Novi Travnik, and the second by two Orao's on the Slavko Rodić weapons plant at Bugojno. According to the aviation author Bojan Dimitrijević, it was planned that the RS air force command centre in Banja Luka would transmit a codeword to signal that the skies over the target area were clear, but communications problems meant that Pešić had to decide whether to launch the mission without that information. About 06:00 on 28 February, eight aircraft took off from Udbina, turning north east. They flew low over the hilly terrain, reaching the area between the towns of Jajce and Ključ about 06:21. Visibility was excellent.

Map of Bosnia and Herzegovina showing the locations of Banja Luka and one of the crash sites

At this time, a British airborne warning and control system (AWACS) aircraft–flying over Hungary as part of the NATO operation–detected at least six aircraft. Its crew warned them via radio to land, exit the no-fly zone, or be engaged, but received no response. About 06:35, the AWACS crew contacted a pair of F-16s from the 526th Fighter Squadron conducting combat air patrol (CAP) operations over the city of Mostar about 150 km (93 mi) south of Novi Travnik. Low on fuel, the US aircraft nevertheless responded and spotted the attacking Jastrebs. They re-issued the warning, but were also ignored, and the Jastrebs continued their attack. According to Dimitrijević, they did not receive the warnings because their aircraft could not receive the frequency on which the warning was issued. Having delivered their attack, the Jastrebs headed back to base, flying at an altitude of about 1,500 m (4,900 ft) to reduce radar signature and vulnerability. The attack was a clear violation of the no-fly zone; having been cleared to open fire, Captain Robert G. Wright launched a radar-guided AIM-120 missile at 06:42 which hit the trailing Jastreb and it crashed just outside the village of Bratstvo. Five minutes later, Wright fired a heat-seeking AIM-9 missile which hit another Jastreb and it crashed near the village of Crkveno 15 km (9.3 mi) from Ključ. The Jastrebs scattered, and, about 06:48, Wright scored a direct hit on another Jastreb with an AIM-9 which destroyed the aircraft. His wingman, Captain Scott O'Grady, fired an AIM-9 at one of the fleeing Jastrebs but missed.

When Wright and O'Grady departed the area to refuel, they handed over the interception to two other 526th Squadron F-16Cs. Captain Stephen L. Allen shot down another Jastreb with an AIM-9 about 06:50, but according to the USAF historian Daniel Haulman, the remaining two Jastrebs escaped into Croatian airspace and returned to Udbina. In contrast, Dimitrijević states that Allen shot down two of the remaining Jastrebs, acknowledging that the USAF only credits him with one. He adds that the remaining Jastreb was entering Croatian airspace and was therefore outside the no-fly zone. He goes on to state that the two Orao's saw two F-16s while they were doing their bombing run at Bugojno, but the US aircraft appeared to have not detected them. The Orao's flew back to Udbina and landed safely. Dimitrijević also states that only one Jastreb returned to Udbina, and that it had been badly damaged by a proximity-fused missile. Its engine shut down on approach to Udbina and the pilot had to conduct an emergency glide landing. Its pilot reported that the other five aircraft had been shot down over Travnik by NATO fighters. None of the Jastreb pilots are believed to have seen the aircraft that shot them down. Three of the Jastreb pilots, including Pešić, were killed. Two others ejected safely.

== Aftermath ==
The United Nations Protection Force (UNPROFOR)–the peacekeeping force in Bosnia and Herzegovina–had reported four of the aircraft taking off from Udbina but did not identify the aircraft type. NATO did not know for certain from which air base the aircraft involved in the confrontation took off due to a combination of the aircraft's low-level flight and the gap between their take off and their detection by AWACS. The two pilots who ejected returned to friendly forces, and the three surviving pilots were brought before a special commission that investigated the incident, focussing mainly on the tactical mistakes. All of the surviving pilots were later decorated. The interception was the first combat action in NATO's history.

The shootdown demonstrated the effectiveness of NATO airpower, and was the only incident during the entirety of Operation Deny Flight in which fixed-wing aircraft were shot down by NATO aircraft. The no fly zone was never directly challenged again, but the RS stepped up their surface-to-air missile (SAM) and anti-aircraft artillery deployments near Bihać in Bosnia. Over the next months they conducted a few fixed-wing missions out of Udbina against ARBiH targets in Bosnia that were close to the Croatian border, using Croatian airspace to maximum advantage, and usually timing the missions for when NATO aircraft were refuelling. This came to a head in late November 1994, when Serb aircraft from Udbina attacked ARBiH targets near Bihać, and NATO responded by conducting airstrikes against the runways and taxiways at Udbina. In June of the following year, O'Grady was shot down by an RS SAM while on CAP and after ejecting safely he was rescued unharmed.
