= December 7 =

December 7 this year in various calendars
- Monday, 7 December 2026
Akan	Fodwo
Armenian	20 Kʿaloch 1476
Aztec	Tozoztontli 6, 7 Quiyahuitl
Babylonian	26 Arakhsamna, 2337 SE
Balinese pawukon	Luang, Pepet, Pasah, Sri, Pon, Tungleh, Coma of Gumbreg, Ludra, Urungan, Pati
Bengali	22 Ogrohayon, BS 1433
Chinese	Yin Wood Rabbit・Exntended Net Mansion; Fire Horse Year, Month 10, Day 29 (Daxue, 15 days until Dongzhi)
Common Era	7 December 2026 CE
Coptic	28 Hathor, AM 1743
Egyptian	25 Pharmuthi, 2775 NE
Ethiopian	28 H̱edār, 2019 Amätä Məhrät
French Republican	Décade II, Sextidi de Frimaire de l'Année 235 de la République
Gregorian	7 December, AD 2026
Hebrew	27 Kislev, AM 5787
Hindu	Viśākhā・Atigaṇḍa; Solar: 21 Mārgaśīrṣa, 1948 SE; Lunisolar: Caturdaśī, Kṛishna pakṣa of Kārtika, 2083 VE; Rāudra・5127 KY・1,872,916
Icelandic	Mánudagur, 15 Ýlir 2026
Islamic	26 Jumada al-thani, AH 1448 (using tabular method)
ISO week date	2026-W50-1
Japanese	29 Kannazuki, Reiwa 8 (Taisetsu, 15 days until Tōji)
Julian	24 November, AD 2026 (AM 7535)
Julian day	2461382
Korean	29 Dwaejidal, 4359 DE
Maya	13.0.14.2.19; 12 Mac, 7 Cauac
Roman	ante diem VIII Kalendas Decembres, MMDCCLXXIX AUC
Solar Hijri	16 Azar, SH 1405
Tibetan	29 smin drug, me pho rta 2153 or 1772 or 1000

<<	December					>>
Su	Mo	Tu	We	Th	Fr	Sa
		1	2	3	4	5
6	7	8	9	10	11	12
13	14	15	16	17	18	19
20	21	22	23	24	25	26
27	28	29	30	31
2026

December 7 in recent years
2025 (Sunday)
2024 (Saturday)
2023 (Thursday)
2022 (Wednesday)
2021 (Tuesday)
2020 (Monday)
2019 (Saturday)
2018 (Friday)
2017 (Thursday)
2016 (Wednesday)

December 7 is the 341st day of the year (342nd in leap years) in the Gregorian calendar; 24 days remain until the end of the year.

== Events ==
=== Pre-1600 ===
- 43 BC – Marcus Tullius Cicero is assassinated in Formia on orders of Marcus Antonius.
- 574 – Byzantine Emperor Justin II, suffering recurring seizures of insanity, adopts his general Tiberius and proclaims him as Caesar.
- 927 – The Sajid emir of Adharbayjan, Yusuf ibn Abi'l-Saj is defeated and captured by the Qarmatians near Kufa.

=== 1601–1900 ===
- 1688 – Siege of Derry: 13 apprentice boys shut the gates of the town of Derry to a Jacobite army.
- 1703 – The Great Storm of 1703, the greatest windstorm ever recorded in the southern part of Great Britain, makes landfall. Winds gust up to 120 mph, and 9,000 people die.
- 1724 – Tumult of Thorn: Religious unrest is followed by the execution of nine Protestant citizens and the mayor of Thorn (Toruń) by Polish authorities.
- 1732 – The Royal Opera House opens at Covent Garden, London, England.
- 1776 – Gilbert du Motier, Marquis de Lafayette, arranges to enter the American military as a major general.
- 1787 – Delaware becomes the first state to ratify the United States Constitution.
- 1837 – The Battle of Montgomery's Tavern, the only battle of the Upper Canada Rebellion, takes place in Toronto, where the rebels are quickly defeated.
- 1842 – First concert of the New York Philharmonic, founded by Ureli Corelli Hill.

=== 1901–present ===
- 1904 – Comparative fuel trials begin between warships HMS Spiteful and HMS Peterel: Spiteful was the first warship powered solely by fuel oil, and the trials led to the obsolescence of coal in ships of the Royal Navy.
- 1917 – World War I: The United States declares war on Austria-Hungary.
- 1922 – The Parliament of Northern Ireland votes to remain a part of the United Kingdom and not unify with Southern Ireland.
- 1930 – W1XAV in Boston, Massachusetts telecasts video from the CBS radio orchestra program, The Fox Trappers. The telecast also includes the first television advertisement in the United States, for I.J. Fox Furriers, which also sponsored the radio show.
- 1932 – German-born Swiss physicist Albert Einstein is granted an American visa.
- 1936 – Australian cricketer Jack Fingleton becomes the first player to score centuries in four consecutive Test innings.
- 1941 – World War II: Attack on Pearl Harbor: The Imperial Japanese Navy carries out a surprise attack on the United States Pacific Fleet and its defending Army and Marine air forces at Pearl Harbor, Hawaii. (For Japan's near-simultaneous attacks on Eastern Hemisphere targets, see December 8.)
- 1942 – World War II: British commandos conduct Operation Frankton, a raid on shipping in Bordeaux harbour.
- 1944 – An earthquake along the coast of Wakayama Prefecture in Japan causes a tsunami which kills 1,223 people.
- 1946 – A fire at the Winecoff Hotel in Atlanta, Georgia kills 119 people, the deadliest hotel fire in U.S. history.
- 1949 – Chinese Civil War: The Government of the Republic of China moves from Nanjing to Taipei, Taiwan.
- 1962 – Prince Rainier III of Monaco revises the principality's constitution, devolving some of his power to advisory and legislative councils.
- 1963 – Instant replay makes its debut during the Army-Navy football game in Philadelphia, Pennsylvania, United States.
- 1965 – Pope Paul VI and Patriarch Athenagoras I simultaneously revoke mutual excommunications that had been in place since 1054.
- 1971 – The Battle of Sylhet is fought between the Pakistani military and the Indian Army.
- 1971 – Pakistan President Yahya Khan announces the formation of a coalition government with Nurul Amin as Prime Minister and Zulfikar Ali Bhutto as Deputy Prime Minister.
- 1972 – Apollo 17, the last Apollo Moon mission, is launched. The crew takes the photograph known as The Blue Marble as they leave the Earth.
- 1982 – In Texas, Charles Brooks Jr., becomes the first person to be executed by lethal injection in the United States.
- 1982 – The Senior Road Tower collapses in less than 17 seconds. Five workers on the tower are killed and three workers on a building nearby are injured.
- 1983 – An Iberia Airlines Boeing 727 collides with an Aviaco DC-9 in dense fog while the two airliners are taxiing down the runway at Madrid–Barajas Airport, killing 93 people.
- 1987 – Pacific Southwest Airlines Flight 1771, a British Aerospace 146-200A, crashes near Paso Robles, California, killing all 43 on board, after a disgruntled passenger shoots his ex-boss traveling on the flight, then shoots both pilots and steers the plane into the ground.
- 1988 – The 6.8 M_{s} Armenian earthquake shakes the northern part of the country with a maximum MSK intensity of X (Devastating), killing 25,000–50,000 and injuring 31,000–130,000.
- 1993 – Long Island Rail Road shooting: Passenger Colin Ferguson murders six people and injures 19 others on the LIRR in Nassau County, New York.
- 1995 – The Galileo spacecraft arrives at Jupiter, a little more than six years after it was launched by Space Shuttle Atlantis during Mission STS-34.
- 1995 – Khabarovsk United Air Group Flight 3949 crashes into the Bo-Dzhausa Mountain, killing 98.
- 1995 – An Air Saint Martin (now Air Caraïbes) Beechcraft 1900 crashes near the Haitian commune of Belle Anse, killing 20.
- 2003 – The Conservative Party of Canada is officially registered, following the merger of the Canadian Alliance and the Progressive Conservative Party of Canada.
- 2005 – Rigoberto Alpizar, a passenger on American Airlines Flight 924 who allegedly claimed to have a bomb, is shot and killed by a team of U.S. federal air marshals at Miami International Airport.
- 2014 – The annual furry convention Midwest FurFest is targeted in an unsolved chlorine gas attack.
- 2015 – The JAXA probe Akatsuki successfully enters orbit around Venus five years after the first attempt.
- 2016 – Pakistan International Airlines Flight 661, a domestic passenger flight from Chitral to Islamabad, operated by an ATR-42-500 crashes near Havelian, killing all 47 on board.
- 2017 – Aztec High School shooting: William Atchison kills two students at his former high school.
- 2024 – Battle of Damascus (2024): Syrian opposition forces enter the Rif Dimashq Governorate, reaching within 20 km of the capital Damascus.
- 2025 – British racing driver Lando Norris wins the Formula One World Drivers' Championship in 2025 with McLaren.
- 2025 – An attempted coup takes place in Benin, but is thwarted, and order restored.

== Births ==
=== Pre-1600 ===
- 521 – Columba, Irish missionary, monk, and saint (died 597)
- 903 – Abd al-Rahman al-Sufi, Persian astronomer and author (died 986)
- 967 – Abū-Sa'īd Abul-Khayr, Persian Sufi poet (died 1049)
- 1302 – Azzone Visconti, Italian nobleman (died 1339)
- 1532 – Louis I, German nobleman and politician (died 1605)
- 1545 – Henry Stuart, English-Scottish husband of Mary, Queen of Scots (died 1567)
- 1561 – Kikkawa Hiroie, Japanese daimyō (died 1625)
- 1595 – Injo of Joseon, Korean king (died 1649)
- 1598 – Gian Lorenzo Bernini, Italian sculptor and painter (died 1680)

=== 1601–1900 ===
- 1643 – Giovanni Battista Falda, Italian architect and engraver (died 1678)
- 1637 – Bernardo Pasquini, Italian organist and composer (died 1710)
- 1756 – John Littlejohn, American sheriff and Methodist preacher (died 1836)
- 1764 – Claude-Victor Perrin, French general and politician (died 1841)
- 1784 – Allan Cunningham, Scottish author and poet (died 1842)
- 1791 – Ferenc Novák, Hungarian-Slovene priest and poet (died 1836)
- 1792 – Abraham Jacob van der Aa, Dutch author and academic (died 1857)
- 1801 – Johann Nestroy, Austrian actor and playwright (died 1862)
- 1810 – Josef Hyrtl, Hungarian-Austrian anatomist and biologist (died 1894)
- 1810 – Theodor Schwann, German physiologist and biologist (died 1882)
- 1823 – Leopold Kronecker, Polish-German mathematician and academic (died 1891)
- 1838 – Thomas Bent, Australian businessman and politician, 22nd Premier of Victoria (died 1909)
- 1860 – Joseph Cook, English-born Australian politician, 6th Prime Minister of Australia (died 1947)
- 1861 – Henri Mathias Berthelot, French general during World War I (died 1931)
- 1862 – Paul Adam, French author (died 1920)
- 1863 – Felix Calonder, Swiss soldier and politician, 36th President of the Swiss Confederation (died 1952)
- 1863 – Pietro Mascagni, Italian composer and conductor (died 1945)
- 1863 – Richard Warren Sears, American businessman, co-founded Sears (died 1914)
- 1869 – Frank Laver, Australian cricketer (died 1919)
- 1873 – Willa Cather, American novelist, short story writer, and poet (died 1947)
- 1878 – Akiko Yosano, Japanese author, poet, pioneering feminist, pacifist, and social reformer (died 1942)
- 1879 – Rudolf Friml, Czech-American pianist, composer, and academic (died 1972)
- 1884 – John Carpenter, American sprinter (died 1933)
- 1885 – Mason Phelps, American golfer (died 1945)
- 1885 – Peter Sturholdt, American boxer and painter (died 1919)
- 1887 – Ernst Toch, Austrian-American composer and songwriter (died 1964)
- 1888 – Joyce Cary, Irish novelist (died 1957)
- 1888 – Hamilton Fish III, American captain and politician (died 1991)
- 1892 – Stuart Davis, American painter and academic (died 1964)
- 1893 – Fay Bainter, American actress (died 1968)
- 1893 – Hermann Balck, German general (died 1982)
- 1894 – Freddie Adkins, English author and illustrator (died 1986)
- 1900 – Kateryna Vasylivna Bilokur, Ukrainian folk artist (died 1961)

=== 1901–present ===
- 1902 – Hilda Taba, Estonian architect, author, and educator (died 1967)
- 1903 – Danilo Blanuša, Croatian mathematician, physicist, and academic (died 1987)
- 1904 – Clarence Nash, American voice actor and singer (died 1985)
- 1905 – Gerard Kuiper, Dutch-American astronomer and academic (died 1973)
- 1906 – Erika Fuchs, German translator (died 2005)
- 1907 – Fred Rose, Polish-Canadian politician and spy (died 1983)
- 1909 – Nikola Vaptsarov, Bulgarian poet and author (died 1942)
- 1910 – Duncan McNaughton, Canadian high jumper and geologist (died 1998)
- 1910 – Louis Prima, American singer-songwriter, trumpet player, and actor (died 1978)
- 1912 – Daniel Jones, Welsh captain and composer (died 1993)
- 1913 – Kersti Merilaas, Estonian author and poet (died 1986)
- 1915 – Leigh Brackett, American author and screenwriter (died 1978)
- 1915 – Eli Wallach, American actor (died 2014)
- 1920 – Tatamkhulu Afrika, South African poet and author (died 2002)
- 1920 – Fiorenzo Magni, Italian cyclist (died 2012)
- 1920 – Walter Nowotny, Austrian-German soldier and pilot (died 1944)
- 1921 – Pramukh Swami Maharaj, Indian guru and scholar (died 2016)
- 1923 – Intizar Hussain, Indian-Pakistani author and scholar (died 2016)
- 1924 – Bent Fabric, Danish pianist and composer (died 2020)
- 1924 – John Love, Zimbabwean race car driver (died 2005)
- 1924 – Mary Ellen Rudin, American mathematician (died 2013)
- 1924 – Mário Soares, Portuguese historian, lawyer, and politician, 17th President of Portugal (died 2017)
- 1925 – Hermano da Silva Ramos, French-Brazilian race car driver (died 2026)
- 1925 – Max Zaslofsky, American basketball player and coach (died 1985)
- 1926 – William John McNaughton, American bishop (died 2020)
- 1927 – Jack S. Blanton, American businessman and philanthropist (died 2013)
- 1927 – Helen Watts, Welsh opera singer (died 2009)
- 1928 – Mickey Thompson, American race car driver (died 1988)
- 1930 – Christopher Nicole, Guyanese-English author (died 2017)
- 1930 – Hal Smith, American baseball player (died 2020)
- 1931 – Allan B. Calhamer, American game designer, created Diplomacy (died 2013)
- 1932 – Oktay Ekşi, Turkish journalist and politician
- 1932 – Rosemary Rogers, American journalist and author (died 2019)
- 1932 – J. B. Sumarlin, Indonesian economist and politician, 17th Indonesian Minister of Finance (died 2020)
- 1932 – Bobby Whitton, Australian rugby league player (died 2008)
- 1933 – Krsto Papić, Croatian director and screenwriter (died 2013)
- 1935 – Armando Manzanero, Mexican musician, singer and composer (died 2020)
- 1936 – Martha Layne Collins, American politician, 56th Governor of Kentucky (died 2025)
- 1937 – Stan Boardman, English comedian
- 1937 – Thad Cochran, American lawyer and politician (died 2019)
- 1937 – Kenneth Colley, English actor (died 2025)
- 1940 – Gerry Cheevers, Canadian ice hockey player and coach
- 1941 – Melba Pattillo Beals, American journalist and activist
- 1942– Alex Johnson, American baseball player (died 2015)
- 1942 – Reginald F. Lewis, American businessman (died 1993)
- 1942 – Peter Tomarken, American game show host and producer (died 2006)
- 1943 – Susan Isaacs, American author and screenwriter
- 1943 – Jóhann Ársælsson, Icelandic politician
- 1943 – Nick Katz, American mathematician and academic
- 1943 – Bernard C. Parks, American police officer and politician
- 1943 – John Bennett Ramsey, American businessman and pilot
- 1944 – Daniel Chorzempa, American organist and composer (died 2023)
- 1944 – Miroslav Macek, Czech dentist and politician (died 2024)
- 1947 – Anne Fine, English author
- 1947 – James Keach, American actor, producer, and director
- 1947 – Garry Unger, Canadian ice hockey player and sportscaster
- 1948 – Tony Thomas, American screenwriter and producer
- 1949 – James Rivière, Italian sculptor and jeweler
- 1950 – Ron Hynes, Canadian singer-songwriter and guitarist (died 2015)
- 1952 – Susan Collins, American politician
- 1952 – Eckhard Märzke, German footballer and manager
- 1952 – Davinder Singh, Indian field hockey player (died 2026)
- 1954 – Mary Fallin, American businesswoman and politician, 27th Governor of Oklahoma
- 1954 – Mark Hofmann, a.k.a. the Mormon Murderer; American counterfeiter, forger of fake Mormon historical documents, and convicted murderer
- 1955 – John Watkins, Australian educator and politician, 14th Deputy Premier of New South Wales
- 1956 – Chuy Bravo, Mexican-American comedian and actor (died 2019)
- 1956 – Iveta Radičová, Slovak politician
- 1956 – Anna Soubry, British politician
- 1957 – Geoff Lawson, Australian cricketer, coach, and sportscaster
- 1957 – Tijjani Muhammad-Bande, Nigerian career-diplomat, President of the United Nations General Assembly (2019)
- 1957 – Tom Winsor, English lawyer and civil servant
- 1958 – Rick Rude, American wrestler and sportscaster (died 1999)
- 1959 – Saleem Yousuf, Pakistani cricketer
- 1960 – Craig Scanlon, English guitarist and songwriter
- 1962 – Alain Blondel, French decathlete
- 1962 – Jeffrey Donaldson, Northern Irish politician
- 1962 – Imad Mughniyah, Lebanese activist (died 2008)
- 1963 – Theo Snelders, Dutch footballer and coach
- 1963 – Katsuya Terada, Japanese illustrator
- 1963 – Barbara Weathers, American R&B/soul singer
- 1964 – Peter Laviolette, American ice hockey player and coach
- 1965 – Deborah Bassett, Australian rower
- 1965 – Colin Hendry, Scottish footballer and manager
- 1966 – C. Thomas Howell, American actor, director,
- 1966 – Shinichi Ito, Japanese motorcycle racer
- 1966 – Kazue Itoh, Japanese actress
- 1966 – Andres Kasekamp, Canadian-Estonian historian and academic
- 1966 – Louise Post, American singer-songwriter and guitarist
- 1967 – Mark Geyer, Australian rugby league player and sportscaster
- 1967 – Tino Martinez, American baseball player, coach, and sportscaster
- 1967 – Nina Turner, American politician
- 1971 – Vladimir Akopian, Azerbaijani-Armenian chess player
- 1972 – Hermann Maier, Austrian skier
- 1972 – Tammy Lynn Sytch, American wrestler and manager
- 1973 – Hack Meyers, American wrestler and trainer (died 2015)
- 1973 – Fabien Pelous, French rugby player and coach
- 1973 – Damien Rice, Irish singer-songwriter, musician and record producer
- 1974 – Manuel Martínez Gutiérrez, Spanish shot putter and actor
- 1975 – Jamie Clapham, English footballer and coach
- 1975 – Mia Love, American politician (died 2025)
- 1976 – Alan Faneca, American football player
- 1976 – Ivan Franceschini, Italian footballer
- 1976 – Georges Laraque, Canadian ice hockey player and politician
- 1976 – Derek Ramsay, Filipino-British actor, model and television personality
- 1976 – Benoît Tréluyer, French race car driver
- 1976 – Joris Vandenbroucke, Belgian politician
- 1977 – Eric Chavez, American baseball player and sportscaster
- 1977 – Luke Donald, English golfer
- 1977 – Dominic Howard, English drummer and producer
- 1978 – Suzannah Lipscomb, English historian, academic and television presenter
- 1979 – Lampros Choutos, Greek-Italian footballer
- 1979 – Ayako Fujitani, Japanese actress and screenwriter
- 1979 – Eric Bauza, Canadian-American voice actor and comedian (died 2026)
- 1980 – Dan Bilzerian, American poker player and internet celebrity
- 1980 – John Terry, English footballer
- 1982 – Lou Amundson, American basketball player
- 1983 – Mike Mucitelli, American mixed martial artist
- 1983 – Al Thornton, American basketball player
- 1984 – Aaron Gray, American basketball player
- 1984 – Robert Kubica, Polish race car driver
- 1984 – Milan Michálek, Czech ice hockey player
- 1984 – Luca Rigoni, Italian footballer
- 1985 – Jon Moxley, American wrestler
- 1986 – Billy Horschel, American golfer
- 1986 – Nita Strauss, American guitarist
- 1987 – Aaron Carter, American singer-songwriter, rapper, dancer, and actor (died 2022)
- 1988 – Nathan Adrian, American swimmer
- 1988 – Angelina Gabueva, Russian tennis player
- 1988 – Andrew Goudelock, American basketball player
- 1989 – Kyle Hendricks, American baseball player
- 1989 – Philip Larsen, Danish ice hockey player
- 1989 – Alessandro Marchi, Italian footballer
- 1989 – Kevin Séraphin, French basketball player
- 1990 – Cameron Bairstow, Australian basketball player
- 1990 – David Goffin, Belgian tennis player
- 1990 – Aleksandr Menkov, Russian long jumper
- 1990 – Yasiel Puig, Cuban baseball player
- 1990 – Urszula Radwańska, Polish tennis player
- 1991 – Eugenio Pisani, Italian race car driver
- 1991 – Chris Wood, New Zealand footballer
- 1992 – Sean Couturier, American-Canadian ice hockey player
- 1993 – Rahama Sadau, Nigerian actress
- 1993 – Alex Singleton, American football player
- 1994 – Pete Alonso, American baseball player
- 1994 – Geno Chiarelli, American politician
- 1994 – Yuzuru Hanyu, Japanese figure skater
- 1994 – Hunter Henry, American football player
- 1997 – Abi Harrison, Scottish footballer
- 1997 – Tommy Nelson, American actor
- 1998 – Tony Yike Yang, Canadian pianist
- 1999 – Boo Buie, American basketball player
- 1999 – Pavol Regenda, Slovak ice hockey player
- 2000 – Dane Belton, American football player
- 2001 – Jalen McMillan, American football player
- 2002 – Torri Huske, American swimmer

== Deaths ==
=== Pre-1600 ===
- 43 BC – Cicero, Roman philosopher, lawyer, and politician (born 106 BC)
- 283 – Eutychian, pope of the Catholic Church
- 881 – Anspert, archbishop of Milan
- 983 – Otto II, Holy Roman Emperor (born 955)
- 1254 – Innocent IV, pope of the Catholic Church (born 1195)
- 1279 – Bolesław V, High Duke of Poland (born 1226)
- 1295 – Gilbert de Clare, 7th Earl of Gloucester, English officer (born 1243)
- 1312 – Michael II of Antioch, Syriac Orthodox patriarch of Antioch (r. 1292–1312)
- 1383 – Wenceslaus I, duke of Luxembourg (born 1337)
- 1498 – Alexander Hegius von Heek, German poet (born 1433)
- 1562 – Adrian Willaert, Dutch-Italian composer and educator (born 1490)

=== 1601–1900 ===
- 1649 – Charles Garnier, French missionary and saint (born 1606)
- 1672 – Richard Bellingham, English-American lawyer and politician, 8th Governor of the Massachusetts Bay Colony (born 1592)
- 1680 – Peter Lely, Dutch-English painter (born 1618)
- 1683 – Algernon Sidney, English philosopher and politician, Lord Warden of the Cinque Ports (born 1623)
- 1723 – Jan Santini Aichel, Czech architect, designed the Pilgrimage Church of Saint John of Nepomuk and Karlova Koruna Chateau (born 1677)
- 1725 – Florent Carton Dancourt, French actor and playwright (born 1661)
- 1772 – Martín Sarmiento, Spanish monk, scholar, and author (born 1695)
- 1775 – Charles Saunders, English admiral and politician (born 1715)
- 1793 – Joseph Bara, French soldier and drummer (born 1779)
- 1803 – Küçük Hüseyin Pasha, Turkish admiral and politician (born 1757)
- 1815 – Michel Ney, German-French general (born 1769)
- 1817 – William Bligh, English admiral and politician, 4th Governor of New South Wales (born 1745)
- 1837 – Robert Nicoll, Scottish poet (born 1814)
- 1842 – Thomas Hamilton, Scottish philosopher and author (born 1789)
- 1874 – Constantin von Tischendorf, German theologian, scholar, and academic (born 1815)
- 1879 – Jón Sigurðsson, Icelandic scholar and politician, 1st Speaker of the Parliament of Iceland (born 1811)
- 1891 – Arthur Blyth, English-Australian politician, 9th Premier of South Australia (born 1823)
- 1894 – Ferdinand de Lesseps, French businessman and diplomat, co-developed the Suez Canal (born 1805)
- 1899 – Juan Luna, Filipino painter and sculptor (born 1857)

=== 1901–present ===
- 1902 – Thomas Nast, German-American cartoonist (born 1840)
- 1906 – Élie Ducommun, Swiss journalist and educator, Nobel Prize laureate (born 1833)
- 1913 – Luigi Oreglia di Santo Stefano, Italian cardinal (born 1828)
- 1917 – Ludwig Minkus, Austrian violinist and composer (born 1826)
- 1918 – Frank Wilson, English-Australian politician, 9th Premier of Western Australia (born 1859)
- 1941 – Attack on Pearl Harbor:
  - Mervyn S. Bennion, American captain (born 1887)
  - Frederick Curtice Davis, American sailor (born 1915)
  - Julius Ellsberry, American sailor (born 1921)
  - John C. England, American sailor (born 1920)
  - Edwin J. Hill, American sailor (born 1894)
  - Ralph Hollis, American sailor (born 1906)
  - Herbert C. Jones, American sailor (born 1918)
  - Isaac C. Kidd, American admiral (born 1884)
  - Robert Lawrence Leopold, American sailor (born 1916)
  - Herbert Hugo Menges, American sailor (born 1917)
  - Thomas James Reeves, American sailor (born 1895)
  - Aloysius Schmitt, American priest and sailor (born 1909)
  - Robert R. Scott, American sailor (born 1915)
  - Peter Tomich, American sailor (born 1893)
  - Robert Uhlmann, American sailor (born 1919)
  - Franklin Van Valkenburgh, American captain (born 1888)
  - Eldon P. Wyman, American sailor (born 1917)
- 1947 – Tristan Bernard, French author and playwright (born 1866)
- 1947 – Nicholas Murray Butler, American philosopher and academic, Nobel Prize laureate (born 1862)
- 1949 – Rex Beach, American author, playwright, and water polo player (born 1877)
- 1956 – Huntley Gordon, Canadian-American actor (born 1887)
- 1956 – Reşat Nuri Güntekin, Turkish author and playwright (born 1889)
- 1960 – Ioannis Demestichas, Greek admiral and politician (born 1882)
- 1962 – Kirsten Flagstad, Norwegian opera singer (born 1895)
- 1969 – Lefty O'Doul, American baseball player and manager (born 1897)
- 1969 – Eric Portman, English actor (born 1903)
- 1970 – Rube Goldberg, American cartoonist, sculptor, and author (born 1883)
- 1975 – Thornton Wilder, American novelist and playwright (born 1897)
- 1975 – Hardie Albright, American actor (born 1903)
- 1976 – Paul Bragg, American nutritionist (born 1895)
- 1977 – Paul Gibb, English cricketer and umpire (born 1913)
- 1977 – Peter Carl Goldmark, Hungarian-American engineer (born 1906)
- 1977 – Georges Grignard, French race car driver (born 1905)
- 1978 – Alexander Wetmore, American ornithologist and paleontologist (born 1886)
- 1979 – Cecilia Payne-Gaposchkin, English-American astronomer and astrophysicist (born 1900)
- 1980 – Darby Crash, American punk rock vocalist and songwriter (born 1958)
- 1984 – Jack Mercer, American voice actor (born 1910)
- 1984 – LeeRoy Yarbrough, American race car driver (born 1938)
- 1985 – J. R. Eyerman, American photographer and journalist (born 1906)
- 1985 – Robert Graves, English poet, novelist, critic (born 1895)
- 1985 – Potter Stewart, American soldier and jurist (born 1915)
- 1989 – Haystacks Calhoun, American wrestler and actor (born 1934)
- 1989 – Hans Hartung, French-German painter (born 1904)
- 1990 – Joan Bennett, American actress (born 1910)
- 1990 – Jean Paul Lemieux, Canadian painter and educator (born 1904)
- 1992 – Richard J. Hughes, American politician, 45th Governor of New Jersey, and Chief Justice of the New Jersey Supreme Court (born 1909)
- 1993 – Abidin Dino, Turkish-French painter and illustrator (born 1913)
- 1993 – Félix Houphouët-Boigny, Ivoirian physician and politician, 1st President of Ivory Coast (born 1905)
- 1995 – Kathleen Harrison, English actress (born 1892)
- 1997 – Billy Bremner, Scottish footballer and manager (born 1942)
- 1998 – John Addison, English-American composer and conductor (born 1920)
- 1998 – Martin Rodbell, American biochemist and endocrinologist, Nobel Prize laureate (born 1925)
- 1998 – George Wilson, American comics artist (born 1921)
- 2003 – Carl F. H. Henry American journalist and theologian (born 1913)
- 2003 – Azie Taylor Morton, American educator and politician, 36th Treasurer of the United States (born 1933)
- 2004 – Frederick Fennell, American conductor and educator (born 1914)
- 2004 – Jerry Scoggins, American singer and guitarist (born 1913)
- 2004 – Jay Van Andel, American businessman and philanthropist, co-founded Amway (born 1924)
- 2005 – Bud Carson, American football player and coach (born 1931)
- 2006 – Jeane Kirkpatrick, American academic and diplomat, 16th United States Ambassador to the United Nations (born 1926)
- 2008 – Herbert Hutner, American banker and lawyer (born 1908)
- 2010 – Elizabeth Edwards, American lawyer and author (born 1949)
- 2010 – Kari Tapio, Finnish singer (born 1945)
- 2011 – Harry Morgan, American actor (born 1915)
- 2012 – Roelof Kruisinga, Dutch physician and politician, Dutch Minister of Defence (born 1922)
- 2012 – Ralph Parr, American colonel and pilot (born 1924)
- 2012 – Marty Reisman, American table tennis player and author (born 1930)
- 2012 – Saul Steinberg, American businessman and financier (born 1939)
- 2013 – Édouard Molinaro, French actor, director, producer, and screenwriter (born 1928)
- 2013 – Chick Willis, American singer and guitarist (born 1934)
- 2014 – Mark Lewis, American author and educator (born 1954)
- 2015 – Gerhard Lenski, American sociologist and academic (born 1924)
- 2015 – Hyron Spinrad, American astronomer and academic (born 1934)
- 2015 – Peter Westbury, English race car driver (born 1938)
- 2016 – Junaid Jamshed, Pakistani recording artist, television personality, fashion designer, occasional actor, singer-songwriter and preacher. (born 1964)
- 2015 – Shirley Stelfox, English actress (born 1941)
- 2016 – Greg Lake, English musician (born 1947)
- 2017 – Steve Reevis, Native American actor (born 1962)
- 2019 – Ron Saunders, English football player and manager (born 1932)
- 2020 – Dick Allen, American baseball player and tenor (born 1942)
- 2020 – Chuck Yeager, American aviator (born 1923)
- 2023 – Benjamin Zephaniah, British writer and dub poet (born1958)
- 2023 – Refaat Alareer, Palestinian professor and writer (born1979)
- 2023 – Emiko Miyamoto, Japanese volleyball player (born 1937)
- 2024 – Doudou Adoula, Congolese atalaku and composer (born 1965)

== Holidays and observances ==
- Armed Forces Flag Day (India)
- Christian feast day:
  - Aemilianus (Greek Church)
  - Ambrose
  - Buíte of Monasterboice
  - Maria Giuseppa Rossello
  - Sabinus of Spoleto
  - December 7 (Eastern Orthodox liturgics)
- Eve of the Immaculate Conception-related observances:
  - Day of the Little Candles, begins after sunset (Colombia)
- International Civil Aviation Day
- National Heroes Day (East Timor)
- National Pearl Harbor Remembrance Day (United States)
- Spitak Remembrance Day (Armenia)
