= 1996 in aviation =

This is a list of aviation-related events from 1996:

== Events ==
=== January ===
- January 8 – Overloaded and fully fueled, an Air Africa Antonov An-32B wet-leased from Moscow Airways fails to takeoff from N'Dolo Airport in Kinshasa, Democratic Republic of Congo, overruns the runway, and ploughs into Kinshasa's crowded Simbazikita street market, where its fuel tanks explode. Two of at least six people on the plane die; in the street market, an estimated 300 people die and about 500 are injured, 253 of them seriously.
- January 12 – Ansett Australia begins service to Jakarta.

=== February ===
- The T-6 Texan II is selected as the new primary trainer for the United States Armed Forces.
- Hildegarde Ferrera becomes the oldest person to parachute out of a plane, at 99 years old.
- February 6 – Birgenair Flight 301, a Boeing 757-225, crashes into the Atlantic Ocean soon after takeoff from Puerto Plata in the Dominican Republic, killing all 189 people on board. It remains the deadliest accident involving a Boeing 757.
- February 9 – British Airways Concorde G-BOAD flies from New York JFK airport to London Heathrow airport in just 2 hours, 52 minutes and 59 seconds, setting a new Transatlantic crossing record for a commercial airliner.
- February 11 – Alyemen Airlines of Yemen merges into Yemenia, forming a single national flag carrier for unified Yemen under the Yemenia name.
- February 12 – Trans World Airlines announces plans to purchase 20 new Boeing 757-200 airliners. It is the airline's first major aircraft acquisition program since before former chairman Carl Icahn took control of the company in 1985.
- February 24 – A Cuban Air Force MiG-29UB fighter shoots down two Cessna Skymasters of the Cuban exile activist group Brothers to the Rescue off Havana, Cuba, killing four members of the group, including pilot Carlos Costa. A third Skymaster escapes.
- February 29
  - WestJet, a Canadian airline, begins operations.
  - Faucett Flight 251, a Boeing 737-222, crashes into hills while on approach to Rodríguez Ballón International Airport in Arequipa, Peru, in darkness and fog, killing all 123 people on board.

=== March ===
- March 2 – A Learjet 25 (registration PT-LSD) carrying the Brazilian satirical rock band Mamonas Assassinas attempts a go-around at São Paulo–Guarulhos International Airport in São Paulo, Brazil, but crashes in the Serra da Cantareira mountain range, killing all eight people on board including all five members of the band.
- March 5 – The Government of Belarus nationalizes and renames the local division of Aeroflot in Belarus, creating the new airline Belavia.
- March 15 – The Dutch aircraft manufacturing company Fokker is declared bankrupt and goes out of business. Its assets will be sold to its competitors.
- March 21 – Tupolev and the National Aeronautics and Space Administration (NASA) begin joint research into civil supersonic transports using a refurbished Tupolev Tu-144.
- March 22 – American astronaut Robert Overmyer dies while testing the stall recovery characteristics at aft center of gravity limits of a Cirrus VK-30 homebuilt aircraft at Duluth, Minnesota, for Cirrus Design. The aircraft goes out of control and rolls inverted, and he is unable to free himself and use his parachute before it crashes.

=== April ===
- The Philippine airline Asian Spirit begins flight operations, offering de Havilland Canada Dash 7 service between Manila and Malay and becoming the first scheduled airline to provide service to the island of Boracay. It is the first Philippine airline to be run as a cooperative.
- April 3 – A United States Air Force Boeing CT-43A crashes into a mountainside on approach to Čilipi Airport in Dubrovnik, Croatia, in poor weather, killing all 35 people on board. Among the dead is United States Secretary of Commerce Ron Brown.
- April 5 – Formosa Airlines Flight 7613, a Dornier 228 registered as B-12257, crashed into the water during a failed go-around attempt. Six out of the 17 occupants on board were killed.
- April 11
  - A fire in the passenger terminal at Düsseldorf Airport in Düsseldorf, Germany, kills 17 people and injures between 62 and 88, according to various sources. It is the deadliest commercial airport building fire in history.
  - Seven-year-old pilot Jessica Dubroff, her father, and her flight instructor die in the crash of their Cessna 177B Cardinal shortly after takeoff from Cheyenne, Wyoming, in poor visibility on the second day of her attempt to set a record as the youngest person to fly across the continental United States.
- April 16 – American aerobatics champion Charlie Hillard is killed when his Hawker FB-60 Sea Fury veers off the runway and noses over while landing in a crosswind at Lakeland, Florida, after an aerobatic performance.
- April 18 – University of Nebraska Cornhuskers football team quarterback Brook Berringer and his passenger are killed when the Piper J-3C-65 Cub he is piloting loses engine power due to a partially closed fuel lever and crashes in an alfalfa field in Raymond, Nebraska.

=== May ===
- May 11 – A fire breaks out in the cargo hold of Valujet Flight 592, a McDonnell Douglas DC-9-32, a few minutes after takeoff from Miami International Airport in Miami, Florida. The aircraft crashes in the Everglades, striking the ground at a speed of over 500 mph (800 km/h) and killing all 110 people on board. Among the dead are American football player Rodney Culver and songwriter and musician Walter Hyatt.
- May 13 – Nepalese Army pilot Lieutenant Colonel Madan Khatri Chhetri lands a Eurocopter AS350 B2 helicopter at Mount Everest's Base Camp 1 at an altitude of 19,600 feet (6,000 meters) to airlift climbers injured in a blizzard to Kathmandu, Nepal.

=== June ===
- The national airline of Ecuador, Ecuatoriana de Aviación, resumes flight operations. It had last flown in September 1993.
- June 9
  - The Swedish Air Force opens a new pilot training centre at Såtenäs
  - Eastwind Airlines Flight 517, a Boeing 737-200 with 53 people on board, experiences a rudder malfunction during a flight from Trenton-Mercer Airport in Trenton, New Jersey, to Richmond International Airport in Richmond, Virginia, which causes the airliner to roll involuntarily to the right twice. The plane lands at Richmond safely saving all 53 occupants onboard with no injuries. Investigation of the incident will help determine the cause of accidents involving United Airlines Flight 585 in 1991 and USAir Flight 427 in 1994.
- June 13 – The pilots of Garuda Indonesia Flight 865, a McDonnell Douglas DC-10-30 with 275 people on board, abort their takeoff from Fukuoka Airport in Fukuoka, Japan, after the fan blade in engine number three separates. The aircraft catches fire, killing three people.

=== July ===
- July 6 – Delta Air Lines Flight 1288, a McDonnell Douglas MD-88 with 142 people on board, experiences an uncontained catastrophic turbine engine failure during its takeoff roll at Pensacola Regional Airport in Escambia County, Florida. The failure causes debris from the front compressor hub of the left engine to enter the passenger compartment, killing two passengers and injuring five others, two of them seriously. The pilot aborts the takeoff.
- July 15 – A Belgian Air Force C-130H Hercules carrying a Belgian crew of four and 37 young Royal Netherlands Army musicians strikes a flock of several hundred starlings and lapwings while attempting to land at Eindhoven Airport in Eindhoven, the Netherlands, crashes, and catches fire. Unaware that the plane is carrying any passengers, responding firefighters focus on putting the fire out instead of rescuing survivors. Thirty-four passengers die. It is the deadliest bird strike in history involving a military aircraft.
- July 16 – Trans World Airlines announces that it has ordered 15 new McDonnell Douglas MD-83 airliners from McDonnell Douglas.
- July 17 – Trans World Airlines Flight 800, a Boeing 747-131, explodes over the Atlantic Ocean near East Moriches, Long Island, New York, apparently due to a short circuit and ignition of fuel-air vapor in a fuel tank. All 230 people on board are killed, making it the third-worst aviation disaster to take place in the United States. French guitarist Marcel Dadi, French artist Sylvain Delange, and photographer Rico Puhlmann are among the dead. Many alternative theories about the cause of the disaster will surface, including that a terrorist bomb detonated aboard the plane or that a United States Navy surface-to-air missile hit it.
- July 21 – During an air show at Barton Aerodrome, Barton-upon-Irwell, Greater Manchester, England, the last de Havilland Mosquito known to be airworthy (serial number RR299), a Mosquito T Mk III built in the spring of 1945, crashes with the loss of both crew members after suffering a loss of engine power when performing a wingover manoeuvre. The incident is captured on video.

=== August ===
- August 16 – Seven Russian men held captive by the Taliban in Kandahar, Afghanistan, since their Airstan Ilyushin Il-76 had been forced down over a year earlier on August 3, 1995, overpower their guards and escape in the plane, flying it to the United Arab Emirates.
- August 19 – Spair Airlines Flight 3601, an Ilyushin Il-76T cargo aircraft, reports electrical problems over Valjevo, Federal Republic of Yugoslavia, 15 minutes after takeoff from Belgrade Nikola Tesla Airport in Belgrade, Yugoslavia. With its communication and navigation systems apparently disabled, the aircraft attempts to return to the airport in darkness and bad weather, flying low over Belgrade to find the runway by sight, but crashes short of the runway, killing the entire crew of 12.
- August 29 – Vnukovo Airlines Flight 2801, a Tupolev Tu-154M, crashes into the mountain Operafjellet at Svalbard, Norway, killing all 141 people on board. It remains the deadliest aviation accident ever to occur in Norway.

=== September ===
- September 3
  - Joint Task Force Southwest Asia extends the no-fly zone over southern Iraq enforced by Operation Southern Watch northward from the 32nd parallel to the 33rd parallel.
  - In response to an Iraqi offensive against Iraqi Kurds in northern Iraq during the Kurdish Civil War, U.S. Air Force B-52 Stratofortresses escorted by U.S. Navy F-14D Tomcats from the aircraft carrier USS Carl Vinson (CVN-70) join the U.S. Navy guided-missile cruiser USS Shiloh (CG-67) and guided-missile destroyer USS Laboon (DDG-58) in conducting Operation Desert Strike, a cruise missile attack against air defense sites in southern Iraq. The 27 missiles – 13 from the B-52s and 14 from Shiloh and Laboon – hit targets in and around Kut, Iskandariyah, Nasiriyah, and Tallil.
- September 4 – A U.S. Air Force F-16 Fighting Falcon fires an AGM-88 HARM anti-radar missile at an Iraqi 9K33 Osa (NATO reporting name "SA-8 Gecko") surface-to-air missile site in southern Iraq after the site's radar locks on to it.
- September 30 – The United States Air Force inactivates the Seventeenth Air Force.

=== October ===
- October 2 – After its flight instruments malfunction, Aeroperú Flight 603, a Boeing 757-23A, crashes into the Pacific Ocean, near Pasamayo, Peru, killing all 70 people on board.
- October 8 – Three B-2 Spirits destroy 16 targets with 16 smart bombs at the Nellis Air Force Base range in Nevada.
- October 14 – A wheel-well stowaway inside a Boeing 747 survives a flight from New Delhi to London at an altitude of 35,000 feet (11,000 meters).
- October 22 – Millon Air Flight 406, a Boeing 707-323C with four people aboard, crashes into a Dolorosa neighborhood in Ecuador, ripping off rooftops and crashing in flames into a restaurant, killing the four aboard and 30 in the neighborhood and injuring 50.
- October 31 – TAM Transportes Aéreos Regionais Flight 402, a Fokker 100, crashes into a São Paulo, Brazil, neighborhood, killing all 96 people aboard and three on the ground.

=== November ===
- November 1 – Transport Canada's aviation responsibilities are split. It retains the responsibility for the regulation of civil aviation in Canada, but its air traffic control responsibilities are transferred to Nav Canada, a new regulated non-profit company.
- November 2 – A U.S. Air Force F-16CJ Fighting Falcon participating in Operation Southern Watch fires an AGM-88 HARM anti-radar missile at an Iraqi mobile surface-to-air missile radar near the 32nd parallel after its pilot receives a radar warning signal.
- November 4 – A U.S. Air Force F-16CJ participating in Operation Southern Watch fires an AGM-88 HARM at an Iraqi mobile surface-to-air missile radar near the 32nd parallel after its pilot receives a radar warning signal.
- November 7 - ADC Airlines Flight 086, a Boeing 727-231, crashes into Lagos Lagoon on approach to Murtala Muhammed International Airport in Lagos, Nigeria, while avoiding a mid-air collision, killing all 144 on board.
- November 12 – Saudi Arabian Airlines Flight 763, a Boeing 747-168B carrying 312 people, and Kazakhstan Airlines Flight 1907, an Ilyushin Il-76 with 37 people aboard, collide over Charkhi Dadri, Haryana, India, killing all 349 people on board the two planes. It remains the deadliest mid-air collision in history.
- November 16 – The Malaysian low-cost airline AirAsia begins flight operations.
- November 19 – While landing at Quincy Regional Airport in Quincy, Illinois, United Express Flight 5925, a Beechcraft 1900 operated by Great Lakes Aviation, collides at an intersection between two runways with a Beechcraft King Air on its takeoff roll. The collision kills both people in the King Air. All 12 people aboard the United Express aircraft die of smoke inhalation when they are unable to open the airliner's doors in time to escape.
- November 23 – Three Ethiopian men seeking political asylum in Australia hijack Ethiopian Airlines Flight 961, a Boeing 767-260-ER flying from Addis Ababa, Ethiopia, to Nairobi, Kenya, with 172 other people on board. Not believing the flight crew's assertion that the plane lacked enough fuel to fly to Australia, they force it to remain in the air until it runs of out of fuel and ditches in the Indian Ocean 500 yards (460 m) off Grande Comore island near Mitsamiouli in the Comoros. The hijackers are among the 125 people killed; all 50 survivors are injured. Kenyan photojournalist Mohamed "Mo" Amin is among the passengers killed in the crash.

=== December ===
- December 15 – McDonnell Douglas and Boeing announce their merger into The Boeing Company. They will complete the merger on August 1, 1997.
- December 17 – Piloting his Beechcraft Baron while returning from a commemoration of the 93rd anniversary of the Wright Brothers' first flight, 75-year-old United States Senator and former astronaut John Glenn sets a speed record for an aircraft of its class, making a 367-mile (591-km) flight from Dayton, Ohio, to Washington, D.C., in 1 hour 36 minutes at an average speed of 229 miles per hour (369 km/h). The National Aeronautic Association will announce the record on February 12, 1997.
- December 24 – After taking off from Sikorsky Memorial Airport in Bridgeport, Connecticut, an Aircraft Charter Group, Inc., Learjet 35A with two people aboard disappears in fog and rain near Dorchester, New Hampshire, leading to an almost-three-year search for the missing aircraft – the longest missing-aircraft search in New Hampshire's history – and legislation requiring stricter emergency locator transmitter (ELT) standards. The aircraft's wreckage finally will be found on November 13, 1999, near Smarts Mountain in Grafton County, New Hampshire, about 20 miles (32 km) from the destination airport.
- December 31 – Operation Provide Comfort II, the enforcement of a no-fly zone over northern Iraq by American, British, and French aircraft, concludes. It will be succeeded the next day by Operation Northern Watch, which also enforces the no-fly zone but without French participation.

== First flights ==
- Boeing Bird of Prey

=== January ===
- January 4 – RAH-66 Comanche

=== February ===
- February 29 – Cessna Citation Excel

=== March ===
- March 16 – Mikoyan MiG-AT
- March 21 – Tupolev Tu-214
- March 29 – RQ-3 Dark Star

=== April ===
- April 2 – Extra EA-200
- April 2 - Sukhoi Su-37
- April 4 – Extra EA-400
- April 5 – Lockheed C-130J Hercules
- April 15 – Culp Special
- April 25 – Yakovlev Yak/AEM-130

=== May ===
- May 1 – NASA ERAST ALTUS II
- May 5 – AeroKuhlmann Scub
- May 26 – Kappa 77 KP 2U-SOVA

=== June ===
- June 17 – Scaled Composites Boomerang
- June 19 – Performance Turbine Legend

=== July ===
- July 23 – Zenith Gemini CH-620
- July 29 – Mitsubishi MH2000

=== August ===
- August 6 – Kawasaki OH-1

=== September ===
- September 14 – Ilyushin Il-114T
- September 30 – Aero L-59 Super Albatros

=== October ===
- Kawada Robocopter
- October 13 – Bombardier Global Express
- October 21 – Aeroprakt A-22 Foxbat
- October 29 – PZL SW-4 helicopter

=== November ===
- November 16 – Papa 51 Thunder Mustang
- November 16 – VisionAire Vantage
- November 29 – Tupolev Tu-144LL

=== December ===
- December 16 – NASA LoFLYTE

== Entered service ==
- Sukhoi Su-30 (NATO reporting name "Flanker-C") with the Russian Federation Air Force

=== February ===
- Tupolev Tu-204 with Vnukovo Airlines

=== April ===
- A340-300 HGW with Singapore Airlines

=== June ===
- Saab JAS-39A Gripen

== Retirements ==
=== May ===
- May 30 – Mirage IV-P bombers of the Armée de l'Air are retired.

=== July ===
- July 27 – The final General Dynamics F-111F attack aircraft are withdrawn from United States Air Force service; on its retirement, the aircraft finally receives an official popular name: "Aardvark."

=== October ===
- October 17 – The last airworthy Vickers Vanguard, G-APEP, makes the type's last flight.

=== December ===
- December 19 – The US Navy retires the Grumman A-6 Intruder.

== Deadliest crash ==
1996 remains one of the deadliest years in aviation history. This includes the deadliest accident of the year, the 1996 Charkhi Dadri mid-air collision of 12 November, over Charkhi Dadri, India, in which all 349 people were killed aboard both aircraft involved. This crash is the world's deadliest mid-air collision, and was also the deadliest of the 1990s decade. The deadliest single-aircraft crash was the relatively little-known 1996 Air Africa crash, when on 8 January an overloaded Antonov An-32 overran the runway at Kinshasa, Zaire; two of the six people aboard were killed, however it was estimated that between 225 and 348 people were killed in a busy street market which lay in the aircraft's path. Otherwise, the distinction belongs to one of the most well-known and studied aviation accidents of all time: TWA Flight 800, a Boeing 747, exploded and crashed into the Atlantic Ocean near Long Island, New York on 17 July, killing all 230 people on board. In addition, many notable accidents including several with over 50 fatalities were recorded during this year.
