= 1995 in aviation =

This is a list of aviation-related events from 1995.

== Events ==
- Alyemda Air Yemen is renamed Alyemen Airlines of Yemen.
- A North American Sabreliner owned by Osama bin Laden is badly damaged in a runway excursion in Khartoum, allegedly ending an Al-Qaeda plot to assassinate Egyptian president Hosni Mubarak by ramming his presidential aircraft.

=== January ===
- January 4 – Mexican composer and conductor Eduardo Mata and his passenger are killed when an engine of the Piper Aerostar Mata is piloting fails and the Aerostar crashes near Cuernavaca, Mexico, shortly after takeoff from Cuernavaca Airport.
- January 10 – Flight 6715, a de Havilland Canada DHC-6, went missing over the Molo Strait. All 14 people on board were likely killed. Investigators suspected that an explosion occurred on the lower cargo compartment.
- January 11 – Intercontinental de Aviación Flight 256 crashes near Cartagena, Colombia with 51 fatalities. A 9-year-old girl is the only survivor.
- January 19 – Lightning strikes Bristow Flight 56C, a Eurocopter AS332 Super Puma helicopter, forcing its pilot to autorotate and ditch in heavy seas in the North Sea near the Brae oilfield's Brae Alpha oil rig. All 18 people on board escape unharmed in a life raft and are rescued.
- January 26 – The Cenepa War breaks out between Peru and Ecuador. Peruvian Mil Mi-8 (NATO reporting name "Hip") and Mil Mi-25 (NATO reporting name "Hind D"), as well as Ecuadorian Aérospatiale Gazelle helicopters begin ground-attack operations.
- January 30 – TransAsia Airways Flight 510A, an ATR 72-200, crashed during its approach when it veered off from its designated route and collided with a hill killing all four crew members on board.
- Project Bojinka, a project to destroy planes and buildings was discovered by authorities in January 1995. A plan to blow up Delta Air Lines and United Airlines planes was also discovered. Ramzi Yousef was the mastermind.

=== February ===
- Cirrus Airlines is founded.
- February 9–12 – Heavy fighting continues between Peru and Ecuador. The Peruvian and Ecuadorian Air Forces step up their activities.
- February 10 – The prototype Antonov An-70 collides with an Antonov An-72 chase plane over Kyiv Oblast in Ukraine during a test flight. The An-72 lands safely at Hostomel Airport, but the An-70 crashes, killing all seven people on board.
- February 10 – A pair of Ecuadorian Air Force Mirage F.1JAs shoot down two Peruvian Air Force Sukhoi Su-22Ms (NATO reporting name "Fitter"). Almost simultaneously, an Ecuadorian Kfir C.2 shoots down a Peruvian Cessna A-37B.
- February 13 – A violent thunderstorm hits Miami International Airport in Miami, Florida, causing US$5 million in damage. Four airliners and nine jetways suffer serious damage.
- February 27 – The last flight to depart Stapleton International Airport in Denver, Colorado – Continental Airlines Flight 34, a Douglas DC-10-30 (registration N12061) bound for London′s Gatwick Airport – takes off, and the airport closes after 65½ years of service; its property will be redeveloped as a residential and retail center. The event also marks the end of Continental's use of Denver as a hub. A large convoy of airport ground vehicles then drives overnight from Stapleton International to its successor, Denver International Airport, which opens the following morning.
- February 28 – Sixteen months behind schedule, Denver International Airport opens in Denver, Colorado, replacing Stapleton International Airport. The first flight to depart from the new airport is United Airlines Flight 1062 to Kansas City International Airport in Kansas City, Missouri, and the first to arrive is United Airlines Flight 1474 from Colorado Springs Airport in Colorado Springs, Colorado.

=== March ===
- March 14
  - An Aeroflot Antonov An-12 crashes near Baku, Azerbaijan, after running out of fuel. Crew negligence is blamed, and it is suggested that the flight crew were drunk.
  - A Bell 206B-3 helicopter piloted by Carlos Menem Jr., the son of President of Argentina Carlos Menem, strikes power lines while taking off at San Nicholas, Argentina, and crashes, killing him and his passenger, Argentinian race car driver Silvio Oltra.
- March 31 – The TAROM A310-324 Muntenia, operating as Flight 371, crashes near Baloteşti, Romania, shortly after takeoff from Otopeni International Airport in Bucharest, killing all 60 people on board.

=== April ===
- April 4 – Russian Federation Air Force warplanes are deployed to support the movement of Russian Army troops into Chechnia.
- April 27 – American air racer and aircraft designer and builder Steve Wittman and his wife die when the Wittman O&O he is piloting crashes near Stevenson, Alabama, after wing flutter makes him lose control of the plane and it crashes, killing both of them.

=== May ===
- May 1 – Bearskin Airlines Flight 362, a Fairchild Metroliner, collided mid-air with Air Sandy Flight 3101, a Piper PA-31 Navajo. All eight people on board both aircraft were killed.
- May3 – The pilot of a Gulfstream II operated by American Jet, inbound from Buenos Aires via La Paz, selected the wrong VOR frequency during a nighttime approach to Quito's Mariscal Sucre International Airport; the jet flew 12 miles (19 km) further south than it should have, striking the Sincholagua volcano at 16,000 feet (4,900 m). All seven occupants were killed. The flight carried notable oil industry executives from Argentina and Chile to a meeting in Quito. Amongst those killed was Argentine YPF's CEO and president José Estenssoro; Juan Pedrals Gili, the Spanish-born general manager of Chilean ENAP as well as Manfred Hecht Mittersteiner, chief of production at ENAP's international subsidiary Sipetrol.
- May 16 – A Royal Air Force BAe Nimrod is forced to ditch in Moray Firth
- May 24 – Knight Air Flight 816 bound for Aberdeen crashes in a field near Dunkeswick shortly after departure from Leeds-Bradford airport. All 9 passengers and 3 crew members were killed.
- May 25–26 – A combined force of North Atlantic Treaty Organization (NATO) aircraft attack a Bosnian Serb ammunition depot near Pale, Bosnia and Herzegovina.
- May 28 – Bosnian Serb forces shoot down a Mil Mi-8 (NATO reporting name "Hip") helicopter carrying the foreign minister of Bosnia and Herzegovina. They also shoot down a United States Air Force F-16 Fighting Falcon.

=== June ===
- June 2 – While on an Operation Deny Flight patrol over Bosnia and Herzegovina, a U.S. Air Force F-16 Fighting Falcon is shot down by a Bosnian Serb 2K12 Kub (NATO reporting name "SA-6 Gainful") surface-to-air missile. Its pilot, Captain Scott O'Grady, ejects and evades capture for six days until he is rescued on June 8 by United States Marines of the 24th Marine Expeditionary Unit based on the amphibious assault ship USS Kearsarge (LHD-3).
- June 6 –Due to fog an Indian Air Force Mil Mi 17 crashed killing a pilot, major and few soldiers died leaving the co-pilot, Flying Officer Deven Arekar with 50% burns later succumbed, Walong, Arunachal Pradesh, India
- June 9 – During an instrument approach to Palmerston North International Airport in Palmerston North, New Zealand, in bad weather, Ansett New Zealand Flight 703, a de Havilland Canada DHC-8-102, crashes west of the Tararua Ranges, killing four of the 21 people on board and injuring all 17 survivors.
- June 12 – A court in Brussels, Belgium, declares Air Zaïre bankrupt, and the airline ceases operations and goes out of business.

=== July ===
- Alliance Air, a multinational airline based in Uganda, begins flight operations, using a single Boeing 747SP.
- July 6 – The Government of Australia abolishes its Civil Aviation Authority and establishes the new Civil Aviation Safety Authority and Airservices Australia. The Civil Aviation Authority's functions are divided between the two new entities, with the Civil Aviation Safety Authority becoming Australia′s national civil aviation authority, with responsibility for the safety of civil aviation, while Airservices Australia, a government-owned corporation, takes over the responsibility for air traffic control in Australia.
- July 11
  - North Atlantic Treaty Organization (NATO) aircraft attack Bosnian Serb targets in the Srebrenica area of Bosnia and Herzegovina. The United Nations Protection Force (UNPROFOR) calls off the airstrikes after Bosnian Serb General Ratko Mladić threatens to kill 50 UNPROFOR personnel seized as hostages and to shell the Bosniak Muslim population in Srebrenica if NATO air strikes continue. The Srebrenica massacre ensues.
  - A Cubana de Aviación Antonov An-24 crashes into the Caribbean off southeast Cuba killing 44 people.
- July 25 – The North Atlantic Council authorizes military planning aimed at deterring an attack on the safe area of Goražde in Bosnia and Herzegovina, and threatens the use of NATO air power if the safe area is threatened or attacked.

=== August ===
- Emerging from financial difficulties, the national airline of Ecuador, Ecuatoriana de Aviación, resumes business operations after being dormant since September 1993. It will resume flight operations in June 1996.
- August 1 – The North Atlantic Council authorizes military planning aimed at deterring attacks on the safe areas of Sarajevo, Bihać, and Tuzla in Bosnia and Herzegovina, and threatens the use of NATO air power if the safe areas are threatened or attacked.
- August 3 – A Taliban-controlled Afghan Air Force MiG-21 forces an Airstan Ilyushin Il-76 carrying cargo to President of Afghanistan Burhanuddin Rabbani to land at Kandahar, Afghanistan. The Taliban will hold the aircraft and the seven Russian men on board for over a year until they escape in the aircraft on August 16, 1996.
- August 4 – NATO aircraft conduct air strikes against Croatian Serb air defense radars in Croatia near Udbina airfield and Knin.
- August 9 – While on approach to land at El Salvador International Airport in San Salvador, El Salvador, during a thunderstorm, Aviateca Flight 901, a Boeing 737-200, crashes into San Vicente volcano, killing all 65 people on board.
- August 10 – The commanders of Allied Forces Southern Europe and the United Nations Protection Force (UNPROFOR) conclude a memorandum of understanding on the execution of airstrikes in Bosnia and Herzegovina.
- August 16 – A Concorde sets a new speed record for a round-the-world flight. It returns to John F. Kennedy International Airport in New York, New York, after a journey lasting 31 hours 27 minutes, passing through Toulouse, France; Dubai, United Arab Emirates; Bangkok, Thailand; Guam; Honolulu, Hawaii; and Acapulco, Mexico.
- August 21 – Atlantic Southeast Airlines Flight 529, an Embraer EMB 120 Brasilia, crashes due to a faulty propeller blade. A post-crash fire kills nine passengers and the captain.
- August 28 – Air Baltic is founded as the flag carrier of Latvia. It will begin flight operations on October 1.
- August 30 – The North Atlantic Treaty Organization (NATO) launches Operation Deliberate Force against Bosnian Serb forces in Bosnia and Herzegovina, employing aircraft based at Aviano Air Base in Italy and aboard the U.S. Navy aircraft carriers USS Theodore Roosevelt (CVN-71) and USS America (CV-66) in the Adriatic Sea. NATO aircraft fly 200 sorties during the first 24 hours, including the first combat missions flown by the German Air Force since the end of World War II in Europe in May 1945. During the day, a Bosnian Serb shoulder-fired surface-to-air missile shoots down a French Air Force Dassault Mirage 2000 near Pale, Bosnia and Herzegovina. Raids will continue until September 14.

=== September ===
- September 1 – The North Atlantic Treaty Organization (NATO) ceases airstrikes in Bosnia and Herzegovina as NATO and the United Nations demand that the Bosnian Serbs lift the Siege of Sarajevo, remove their heavy weapons from the heavy weapons exclusion zone around Sarajevo, and make no further moves to endanger the complete security of other United Nations safe areas in Bosnia and Herzegovina. NATO threatens to resume air strikes if the Bosnian Serbs do not meet these demands by September 4.
- September 2 – At the Canadian International Air Show in Toronto, Ontario, Canada, a Royal Air Force Hawker Siddeley Nimrod MR.2P maritime patrol aircraft making a demonstration flight stalls during a low-altitude turn and crashes into Lake Ontario, killing its entire seven-man crew.
- September 5 – The Bosnian Serbs having failed to comply with its demands of September 1, NATO resumes air attacks on their positions around Sarajevo and near the Bosnian Serb headquarters at Pale. During the day, the U.S. Navy's Grumman F-14 Tomcat fighter is used as an attack aircraft for the first time when an F-14A operating from the aircraft carrier USS Theodore Roosevelt (CVN-71) in the Adriatic Sea drops two 2,000-pound (910 kg) bombs on Bosnian Serb positions in Bosnia and Herzegovina.
- September 10 – U.S. Air Force McDonnell Douglas F-15E Strike Eagles and U.S. Navy McDonnell Douglas F/A-18 Hornets employing about a dozen precision-guided bombs and U.S. Air Force F-16 Fighting Falcons using Maverick missiles join the U.S. Navy guided-missile cruiser USS Normandy (CG-60), which launches a BGM-109 Tomahawk cruise missile strike from the central Adriatic Sea, in an attack on several Yugoslav air defense radio relay towers in the Lisina area, near Banja Luka, in the Federal Republic of Yugoslavia.
- September 11 – The NASA Pathfinder unmanned aerial vehicle (UAV) sets an unofficial world altitude record for solar-powered aircraft of 50,000 feet (15,000 meters) during a 12-hour flight from the Dryden Flight Research Center at Edwards Air Force Base, California.
- September 14 – NATO suspends its air campaign in Bosnia and Herzegovina for 72 hours – later extended to 114 hours – to allow the Bosnian Serbs to implement an agreement with NATO requiring them to withdraw their heavy weapons from the Sarajevo exclusion zone in Bosnia and Herzegovina.
- September 19 – Flight attendant Reza Jabari hijacks Kish Air Flight 707, a Tupolev Tu-154M carrying 174 people, during a flight from Tehran, Iran, to Kish Island, Iran, and demands that it fly to Europe. Lacking the fuel to do so, the plane instead lands at the military base at Ovda Airport in Israel, where Jabari is arrested. The airliner's passengers are flown to Iran the next day.
- September 20 – The commanders of the United Nations Protection Force (UNPROFOR) and Allied Forces Southern Europe agree that the resumption of Operation Deliberate Force airstrikes is not necessary, as Bosnian Serbs had complied with the conditions set out by the United Nations. The NATO bombing campaign in Bosnia and Herzegovina comes to an end. During the 22-day campaign, NATO aircraft have flown 3,515 sorties against 338 individual targets, losing only one aircraft, with its two-man crew captured.
- September 22 – A United States Air Force E-3 Sentry runs into a flight of Canada geese on takeoff from Elmendorf Air Force Base in Anchorage, Alaska. The two portside engines ingest geese, and the plane crashes 2 miles (3.2 km) from the runway, killing all 24 people on board. It is the deadliest bird strike in history involving a U.S. military aircraft.

=== October ===
- October 1 – The flag carrier of Latvia, Air Baltic, begins flight operations. The airline takes delivery of its first plane, a Saab 340, during the day, and the plane makes the airline's first flight during the afternoon.
- October 2 – Aer Lingus retires its Boeing 747s from service. Over the preceding 25 years, over eight million people had flown on transatlantic flights aboard Aer Lingus Boeing 747s.

=== November ===
- The Swiss airline Crossair begins charter service for its major shareholder, Swissair.
- November 9 – Macau International Airport opens for commercial operations in Macau.
- November 12 – American Airlines Flight 1572, a McDonnell Douglas MD-83 with 78 people on board, lands short of the runway at Bradley International Airport in Windsor Locks, Connecticut. Only one person is injured.
- November 13 – Nigeria Airways Flight 357, a Boeing 737-200, suffered a runway excursion killing 11 out of the 138 occupants on board.
- November 17 – The rollout of the first HAL Light Combat Aircraft (LCA) technology demonstrator, TD-1, takes place.

=== December ===
- December 3 – Cameroon Airlines Flight 3701, a Boeing 737-200, loses power in one engine while on approach to Douala International Airport in Douala, Cameroon, and crashes short of the runway into a mangrove swamp, killing 71 of the 76 people on board and injuring all five survivors.
- December 5 – Azerbaijan Airlines Flight 56 crashes shortly after takeoff from Nakhchivan Airport, killing 52 people on board.
- December 6 – Khabarovsk United Air Group Flight 3949 crashes into Bo-Dzhausa Mountain, Russia, killing all 98 people aboard (including six children).
- December 7 – An Air Saint Martin Beechcraft 1900D chartered by the Government of France to return illegal immigrants from French territory to Haiti drifts off course and crashes into a mountain near Bell-Anse, Haiti, while on approach to Port-au-Prince, Haiti, killing all 20 people on board.
- December 9 – Idaho National Guard F-4G Phantom IIs finish their tour of duty in Operation Provide Comfort II at Incirlik Air Base, Turkey. It concludes the final U.S. Air Force operational use of the F-4 Phantom II.
- December 12 – The Bosnian Serbs release two French airmen who on August 30 had become the only North Atlantic Treaty Organization (NATO) personnel captured during NATO's Operation Deliberate Force bombing campaign when a Bosnian Serb shoulder-fired surface-to-air missile shot down their Dassault-Breguet Mirage 2000 near Pale, Bosnia and Herzegovina. They report that the Bosnian Serbs had treated them well during their captivity.
- December 13 – Overloaded and suffering from icing on its wings, Banat Air Flight 166, a chartered Antonov An-24B, crashes at Sommacampagna, Italy, on takeoff from Verona Airport, Verona, during a snowstorm. All 49 people on board die.
- December 18 – A badly overloaded Trans Service Airlift Lockheed L-188C Electra on a special charter flight for UNITA crashes at Cahangula, Angola, on takeoff from Jamba Airport, killing 141 of the 144 people on board and injuring all three survivors. The deadliest aircraft crash of 1995 at the time, its death toll will be exceeded two days later.
- December 20 – An American Airlines Boeing 757 operating as Flight 965 crashes on a mountainside near Cali, Colombia, minutes before beginning its landing approach. Four people on board the aircraft survive, but 159 people die in the deadliest aviation accident of 1995.

== First flights ==
=== March ===
- March 3 — Gippsland GA8 Airvan
- March 14 — HB Flugtechnik HB-207 Alfa
- March 21 – Cirrus SR20
- March 31 – Grob Strato 2C
- March 31 — Myasishchev M-101T

=== May ===
- May 31 — Schweizer RU-38 Twin Condor

=== June ===
- June 9 – Eurocopter Colibri

=== August ===
- August 10 – IPTN N-250
- August 17 – Embraer ERJ 145 family
- August 25 – Airbus A319

=== September ===
- September 18 – Lambach HL II

=== October ===
- October 7 – Learjet 45
- October 7 – Mitsubishi F-2

=== November ===
- November 2 – Fokker 60
- November 28 – Gulfstream V
- November 29 – Boeing F/A-18E/F Super Hornet

=== December ===
- December 1 – Air Tractor AT-602

== Entered service ==
=== April ===
- April 2 - McDonnell Douglas MD-90 with Delta Air Lines

=== June ===
- June 7 – Boeing 777 with United Airlines

== Deadliest crash ==
The deadliest crash of this year was American Airlines Flight 965, a Boeing 757 which crashed in mountainous terrain near Buga, Colombia on 20 December, killing 159 of the 163 people on board.
