= Air Force Flight Test Museum =

- Location within California
- Former name: Air Force Flight Test Center Museum (Note: According to a comparison of two snapshots of the museum's website, the name appears to have changed between September 2012 and January 2013.)
- Location: Rosamond, California
- Coordinates: 34.912°N 117.921°W
- Type: Military aviation museum
- Website: flighttestmuseum.org

The Air Force Flight Test Museum is an aviation museum located at Edwards Air Force Base near Rosamond, California, focused on the history of the Air Force Flight Test Center.

== History ==
The Flight Test Museum Foundation was founded in 1983 by Carol Odgers, Chuck Yeager, Robert Cardenas, and William J. Knight. A 335-acre site on Rosamond Boulevard was given to the foundation in 1984 to build a museum, but construction was delayed for many years. In the intervening time, the museum moved forward with the creation of the Blackbird Airpark at Air Force Plant 42 in 1991 and began collaborating with a group of amateur archaeologists to display pieces of wreckage of crashed x-planes recovered from the desert.

By 1997, the museum had raised enough money to begin construction on a new 8,500 sq ft (790 m^{2}) building, which was fitted out in 1999 and opened in July 2000. Further efforts led to the opening of a Century Circle outside the west gate in August 2007 made up of six Century Series airplanes and the top of the former Edwards Air Force Base control tower. The museum's longtime chief historian, Dr. Jim Young, retired in 2011.

Efforts to move aircraft to better storage conditions began in March 2012, when the museum cleaned up its storage yard. This was followed by a number of significant moves in 2013, with the restoration shop being relocated to a new hangar with better equipment in February, three aircraft being towed to the museum grounds in August, and a VH-34 being transferred to a museum in Texas in September.

After its closure in 2015, an XB-47 was acquired from the Octave Chanute Aerospace Museum.

The museum broke ground on a new location outside the gate to the base in March 2018. Following site preparation, the first concrete was poured in June 2020. The first phase of construction was completed in May 2023.

== Collection ==
=== Aircraft ===
- Accurate Automation LoFLYTE
- Beech UC-45J Expeditor 67161
- Bell P-59A Airacomet 44-22633
- Bell X-1 – Replica
- Bensen X-25B 68-10771
- Boeing NC-135A Stratolifter 60-0377
- Boeing C-135C Stratolifter 61-2669 "Speckled Trout"
- Boeing NB-52B Stratofortress 52-0008
- Boeing Phantom Eye
- Boeing XB-47 Stratojet 46-0066
- Boeing X-48C
- Cessna NA-37B Dragonfly 73-1090
- Convair F-106B Delta Dart 59-0158
- Convair TF-102A Delta Dagger 54-1353
- Convair YB-58A Hustler 55-665
- de Havilland Canada C-7B Caribou 63-9765
- Douglas A3D-1 Skywarrior 135434
- Douglas C-53D Skytrooper 41-20093
- Douglas F-10B Skyknight 125850
- Douglas TB-26B Invader 44-34165
- Fairchild T-46A 84-0492
- Fairchild Republic YA-10B Thunderbolt II 73-1664
- General Dynamics F-16B Fighting Falcon 75-0751
- General Dynamics F-16B Fighting Falcon 80-0634
- General Dynamics F-16XL 75-0747
- General Dynamics F-16XL 75–0749
- General Dynamics F-111A Aardvark 63-9766
- General Dynamics NF-111A Aardvark 63-9778
- Gloster Meteor TT.20 WD592
- Grumman X-29 82-0049
- Grumman Gulfstream II Shuttle Training Aircraft
- Lockheed A-12 60-6924
- Lockheed C-130E Hercules 61-2358
- Lockheed C-140A JetStar 59-5962
- Lockheed D-21B
- Lockheed EF-80A Shooting Star 44-85123
- Lockheed F-104A Starfighter 56-801
- Lockheed NC-141A Starlifter 61-2779
- Lockheed NF-104A Starfighter 56-756
- Lockheed NF-104A Starfighter 56-790
- Lockheed SR-71A Blackbird 61-7955
- Lockheed SR-71A Blackbird 61-7973 – On loan
- Lockheed T-33A 52-9846
- Lockheed T-33A 58-0669
- Lockheed U-2D 56-6721
- Lockheed YF-22 87-0700
- Lockheed YF-94A Starfire 48-356
- Lockheed YF-117A Nighthawk 79-10783
- LTV YA-7D Corsair II 67-14583
- LTV YA-7F 71-0344
- Martin RB-57B Canberra 52-1576
- Martin Marietta Model 845 01454
- McDonnell F-4C Phantom II 64-0741
- McDonnell Douglas F-15B Eagle 73-0114
- McDonnell Douglas X-36
- McDonnell Douglas YC-15 72-1875
- McDonnell Douglas YF-4E Phantom II 65-0713
- McDonnell Douglas YF-15A Eagle 71-0287
- McDonnell F-101B Voodoo 58-288
- McDonnell NF-4C Phantom II 63-7407
- McDonnell RF-4C Phantom II 64-1004
- Mikoyan-Gurevich MiG-21PF 761811
- NASA M2-F1
- North American CT-39A Sabreliner 60-3505
- North American F-86F Sabre 52-5241
- North American F-100A Super Sabre 52-5760
- North American T-28B Trojan 137702
- North American X-15 – Replica
- North American YF-100A Super Sabre 52-5755
- Northrop F-89D Scorpion 52-1959
- Northrop T-38A Talon 61-0810
- Northrop T-38A Talon 61-0849
- Northrop X-4 Bantam 46-676
- Northrop X-21 55-408
- Northrop X-21 55-410
- Northrop YA-9A 71-1367
- Piasecki H-21B Work Horse 52-8623
- Piper PA-48 Enforcer 48-8301002
- Republic F-84F Thunderstreak 51-9350
- Republic F-105D Thunderchief 61-146
- Rockwell B-1B Lancer 84-0049
- Rutan VariEze
- Ryan AQM-34J Firebee
- Scaled Composites Model 133
- Scaled Composites Model 226
- Sikorsky CH-34G Seabat 53-4477
- Sikorsky JCH-3C 62-12581

=== Missiles ===
- PGM-17 Thor

== Events ==
The museum holds an annual gala called the Gathering of Eagles.

== See also ==
- List of aviation museums
