= Flight 406 =

Flight 406 may refer to:

- Air France Flight 406, crashed on 10 May 1961
- South African Airways Flight 406, crashed on 13 March 1967
- Millon Air Flight 406, crashed on 22 October 1996
