= USS Hollis =

Buckley-class destroyer escort

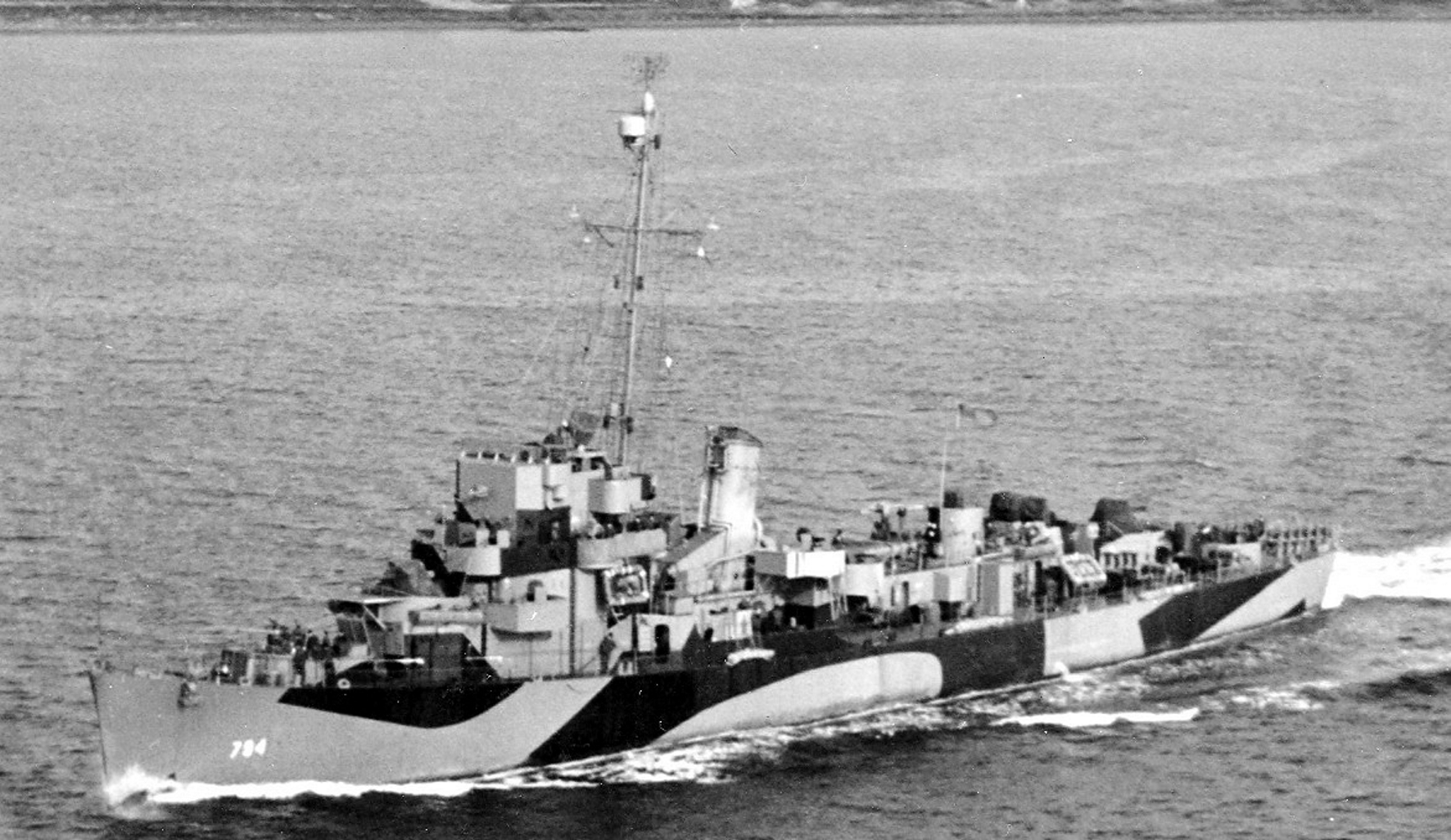

History

United States
- Laid down: 5 July 1943
- Launched: 11 September 1943
- Commissioned: 24 January 1944
- Reclassified: APD-86, 24 January 1945
- Decommissioned: 16 October 1956
- Stricken: 15 September 1974
- Fate: Sold for scrap, 1 July 1975

General characteristics
- Displacement: 1,740 tons (full); 1,400 tons, (standard)
- Length: 306 ft (93 m)
- Beam: 36 ft 9 in (11.20 m)
- Draft: 13 ft 6 in (4.11 m)
- Propulsion: GE turbo-electric drive, 12,000 shp (8.9 MW); two propellers
- Speed: 24 knots (44 km/h)
- Range: 4,940 nautical miles at 12 knots; (9,200 km at 22 km/h)
- Complement: 15 officers, 198 men
- Armament: 3 × 3 in (76 mm) DP guns, 3 × 21 in (53 cm) torpedo tubes, 1 × 1.1 in (28 mm) quad AA gun, 8 × 20 mm cannon, 1 × hedgehog projector, 2 × depth charge tracks, 8 × K-gun depth charge projectors

USS Hollis (DE-794/APD-86) was a Buckley-class destroyer escort in service with the United States Navy from 1944 to 1947 and from 1951 to 1956. She was scrapped in 1975.

== History ==
Hollis was launched by the Consolidated Steel Corporation of Orange, Texas, on 11 September 1943, sponsored by Mrs. Hermione C. Hollis, widow of Ensign Hollis, and commissioned on 24 January 1944 at Orange.

=== Battle of the Atlantic ===
After shakedown in the Atlantic, Hollis made two escort voyages along the East Coast and then reported to Quonset Point, R.I., to assist in sonic research. The aim was to find countermeasures for the German acoustic torpedo, and the destroyer escort remained on this important duty until 28 May, when she sailed to Casablanca in an aircraft carrier screen. Returning to New York on 17 June, Hollis was soon at sea again, this time as part of an escort and hunter-killer unit. She operated from July to mid-August escorting convoys in the Mediterranean, and escorted a convoy to the southern France invasion area on 15 August as Allied troops stormed ashore. In the months that followed, as the offensive gained momentum, Hollis continued her role as an escort in the Mediterranean, ensuring the flow of vital supplies and men. She sailed for the United States on 28 December, and arrived on 18 January to undergo conversion to a high-speed transport at Philadelphia Navy Yard.

=== Pacific War ===
Fitted out to carry amphibious assault troops, Hollis was reclassified APD-86, on 24 January 1945, and conducted her shakedown in April and May off the Atlantic coast. Sailing from Miami, Florida on 10 May, the ship transited the Panama Canal and sailed for Pearl Harbor and the Pacific War. She arrived on 30 May and immediately began training with Underwater Demolition Teams, the Navy's famed "frogmen", on Maui island. Converted to a UDT flagship, Hollis sailed to Eniwetok and Guam as the Japanese were accepting surrender terms, arriving Apra Harbor on 23 August 1945.

Hollis, now flagship for Pacific UDT forces, sailed to Tokyo Bay to assist in the occupation, arriving on 1 September. There she witnessed the formal surrender ceremonies of the Japanese Empire the next day. Following occupation duties the ship sailed for San Diego California, where she arrived on 23 October, and thence via the Panama Canal to Boston. Arriving on 15 February 1946, the transport spent four months at Charleston, S.C., before arriving at Green Cove Springs, Florida, on 13 October 1946. Hollis decommissioned on 5 May 1947 and entered the Atlantic Reserve Fleet.

=== Cold War ===
With the increase in fleet strength brought about by the Korean War, Hollis recommissioned on 6 April 1951 and conducted shakedown training out of Norfolk, Virginia. The ship sailed from her home port at Naval Amphibious Base Little Creek, Virginia, on 8 October to take part in amphibious exercises in the Caribbean and on the coast of North Carolina, returning 20 November.

For the next five years Hollis continued to participate in amphibious exercises, antisubmarine training, and maneuvers. In 1954 and 1955 she served briefly as school ship for Fleet Sonar School, Key West, Florida. In 1954 she took part in a North Atlantic cold weather exercise off Labrador, and in 1955 her schedule included a month of training of Naval Reserve Officer Training Corps midshipman training.

=== Decommissioning and fate ===
Hollis arrived Green Cove Springs, Florida (USA), on 17 July 1956, and decommissioned there 16 October 1956. Stricken from the Navy Register on 15 September 1974, Hollis was sold for scrap on 1 July 1975.

== Namesake ==
Ralph Hollis was born on 10 September 1906 in Crawfordville, Georgia. He served in the navy from 1923 to 1926. From 1926 to 1933, he was driver-pump operator with the Palm Beach Fire Dept, then became a lieutenant in the Palm Beach Police Department in charge of radio communications. He was appointed Ensign in the United States Naval Reserve on 21 November 1934 and was called to active duty in May 1941. After attending a special course in communications, Ensign Hollis reported to battleship USS Arizona in September and was promoted to Lieutenant (Junior Grade) on 15 November. Serving as communications officer on board the Arizona, Lt. Hollis was killed during the Japanese attack on Pearl Harbor on 7 December 1941.

== Awards ==
Hollis received one battle star for World War II service.
