= AeroKuhlmann Scub =

Scub

General information
- Type: 2-seat light aircraft
- National origin: France
- Manufacturer: AeroKuhlmann
- Number built: 17 by mid-1999.

History
- First flight: 5 May 1996

The AeroKuhlmann Scub is a single engine, high wing utility aircraft built in France in the 1990s.

== Design and development ==
The Scub is a high wing light utility aircraft, capable of cargo, medical, mapping, agricultural and surveillance work. It is powered by a single 62.5 kW (83.3 hp) JPX 4TX75A flat four engine and seats two in tandem with dual control. It has a conventional layout, with a straight edged wings carrying 2° of dihedral. The short span ailerons extend to the squared-off tips. The wings are of mixed construction, based on a single 3-ply birch spar with a carbon fibre cap combined with glass fibre ribs. The leading edge is plywood, the rest covered with Dacron. The wings fold for storage.

The fuselage of the Scub is a chrome-molybdenum steel tube structure, Dacron covered and flat sided. The tapered, square topped vertical stabilizer has a horn balanced rudder. The starboard elevator carries a trim tab. The Scub has a conventional, fixed undercarriage without wheel fairings. Floats or skis may be fitted instead; the conversion takes about 2 hours. Floats add 50 kg (110 lb) to the empty weight. For agricultural work, Micronair 7000 atomisers are fitted on underwing bars, fed from a bulbous ventral tank. Surveillance cameras can be mounted underwing.

The Scub first flew on 5 May 1996. It was certified to JAR-VLA standard in France. In 2000, it was available either as an Ultralight, with maximum take-off weights (MTOW) of 450 kg (992 lb) in Europe or 544 kg (1.200 lb) in USA, or with a MTOW of 598 kg (1,320 lb).

== Operational history ==
The Scub had its first public outing at the 1997 Paris Airshow and by mid-1999 17 had been built. Several have been used in Madagascar for crop spraying. In mid-2010, 8 were on the European civil registers.

== Specifications (MTOW, landplane) ==
Data from Jane's All the World's Aircraft 2000/01

General characteristics

- Capacity: 2
- Length: 7.01 m (23 ft 0 in)
- Wingspan: 10.06 m (33 ft 0 in)
- Height: 1.83 m (6 ft 0 in)
- Wing area: 14.77 m^{2} (159.0 sq ft)
- Airfoil: NASA L51 0417 modified, supercritical
- Empty weight: 304 kg (670 lb)
- Max takeoff weight: 598 kg (1,318 lb)
- Powerplant: 1 × JPX 4TX75A flat four, 62.5 kW (83.8 hp)
- Propellers: 2-bladed UTX, wooden

Performance

- Maximum speed: 124 km/h (77 mph, 67 kn)
- Stall speed: 60 km/h (37 mph, 32 kn)
- Never exceed speed: 169 km/h (105 mph, 91 kn)
- Range: 1,005 km (624 mi, 543 nmi)
- Endurance: 7.0 h
- Service ceiling: 4,570 m (14,990 ft)
- Maximum glide ratio: 15:1, unpowered
- Rate of climb: 4.2 m/s (830 ft/min)
