= USS Leopold =

WWII US naval vessel

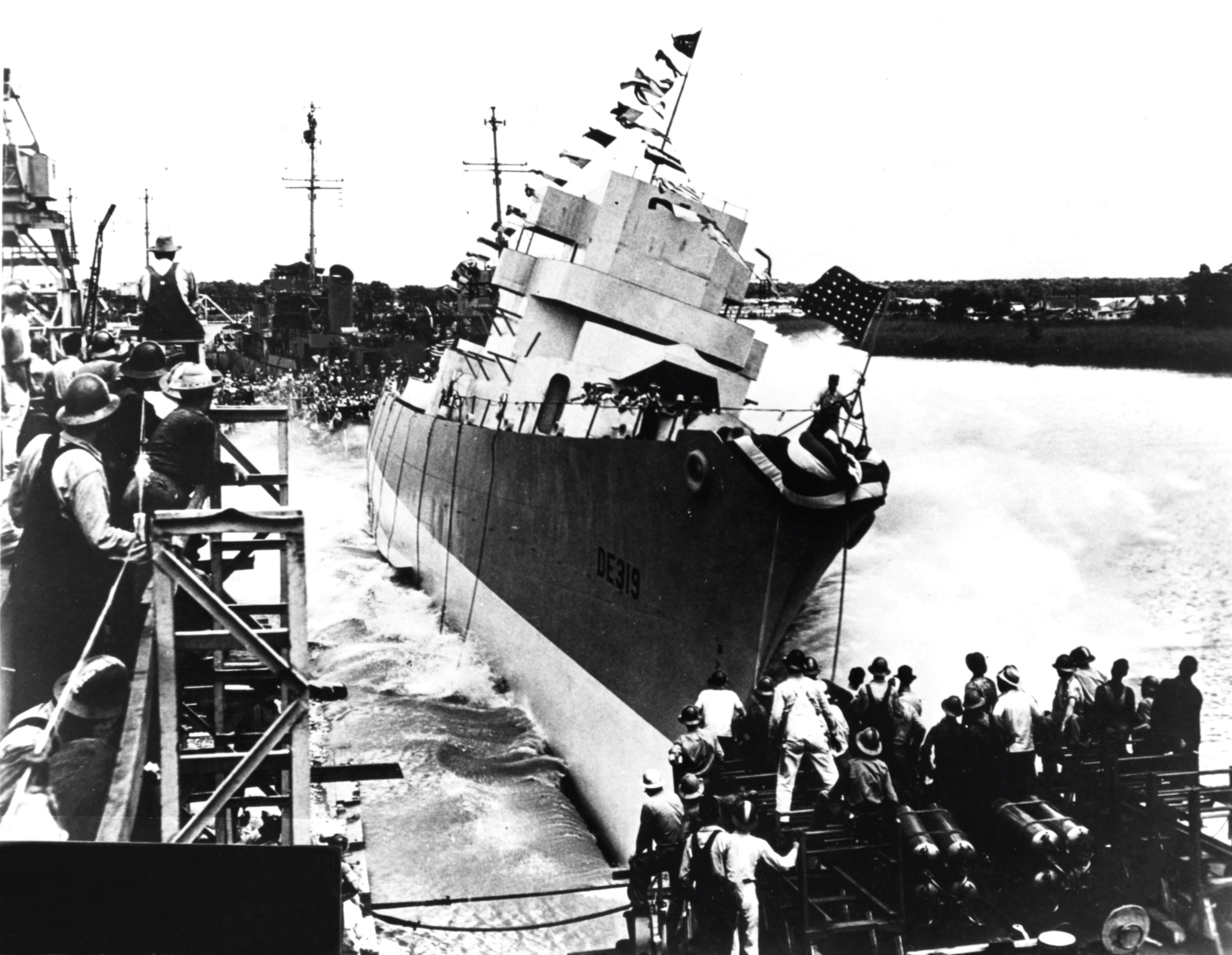
- USS Leopold (DE-319) launching at Orange, Texas on 12 June 1943

History

United States
- Name: USS Leopold
- Namesake: Robert Lawrence Leopold
- Builder: Consolidated Steel Corporation, Orange, Texas
- Laid down: 24 March 1943
- Launched: 12 June 1943
- Sponsored by: Ms. Helen S. Leopold
- Commissioned: 18 October 1943
- Fate: Sunk, 10 March 1944

General characteristics
- Class & type: Edsall-class destroyer escort
- Displacement: 1,253 long tons (1,273 t) (standard); 1,590 long tons (1,616 t) (full load)
- Length: 306 ft (93 m)
- Beam: 36.58 ft (11.15 m)
- Draft: 10.42 ft (3.18 m) full load
- Installed power: 6,000 shp (4,500 kW)
- Propulsion: 4 × FM diesel engines; 4 × diesel-generators; 2 × shafts
- Speed: 21 kn (24 mph; 39 km/h)
- Range: 9,700 nmi (11,200 mi; 18,000 km) at 12 kn (14 mph; 22 km/h)
- Complement: 8 officers, 201 enlisted
- Armament: 3 × single 3 in (76 mm)/50 guns; 1 × twin 40 mm AA guns; 8 × single 20 mm AA guns; 1 × triple 21 in (533 mm) torpedo tubes; 8 × depth charge projectors; 1 × depth charge projector (hedgehog); 2 × depth charge tracks

USS Leopold (DE-319) was an Edsall-class destroyer escort built for the United States Navy during World War II. Named for Ensign Robert Lawrence Leopold, to date it is the only United States Navy vessel to bear the name.

== Namesake ==
Robert Lawrence Leopold was born on 11 November 1916 in Louisville, Kentucky. He enlisted in the Naval Reserve 10 July 1940. Following training in Wyoming, he was appointed midshipman on 16 September 1940 and commissioned Ensign on 12 December. Reporting for duty on board the USS Arizona two weeks later, Leopold was killed in action on 7 December 1941 during the attack on Pearl Harbor.

== Construction and commissioning ==
Leopold was laid down on 24 March 1943 by the Consolidated Steel Corporation of Orange, Texas; launched on 12 June 1943; sponsored by Ms. Helen S. Leopold, sister of Ensign Leopold; and commissioned on 18 October 1943.

== History ==
After structural firing tests at Galveston, Texas she departed for New Orleans. On 7 November, she proceeded to Great Sound, Bermuda where shakedown exercises were begun. On 9 December, she left for Charleston, South Carolina and 11 days of post-shakedown availability.

After four days of training exercises for officers and her nucleus crew for new destroyer escorts in the Chesapeake Bay area, Leopold stood out of Thimble Shoal Channel on 24 December 1943 as part of Task Force 61 (TF 61), escorting convoy UGS-68 to the Mediterranean. On 30 December, Leopold was directed to go to the rear of the convoy and search for a seaman reported lost overboard from one of the convoy ships. It was very dark and fairly rough, so, unless the seaman had on a life jacket with a light, the chances of finding him were slight. After 45 minutes, she discontinued the search. The convoy reached the Straits of Gibraltar on 10 January and was turned over to British escorts. Leopold moored at Casablanca the next day. On 13 January, she commenced patrolling as anti-submarine screen across the Atlantic side of the Straits of Gibraltar, TF 61 forming a line to prevent U-boats from entering the Mediterranean. On 15 January, she moored at Gibraltar, and the following day, proceeded out of the inner harbor to close up the stragglers on west-bound convoy GUS-27. On 1 February, a northwesterly gale caused the convoy to scatter and much time was consumed rounding up stragglers. Leopold arrived at New York on 4 February for ten days availability at the Navy Yard. From 14 to 27 February, Leopold – with other escorts of Escort Division 22 (CortDiv 22) – underwent training exercises at Casco Bay, Maine.

Departing New York on 1 March on her second voyage, Leopold took her screening station – as part of CortDiv 22 – with the 27-ship convoy CU-16 bound for the British Isles. On 8 March, she reported an HF/DF intercept which indicated an enemy submarine on the route of the convoy. The route was consequently altered. On 9 March, while south of Iceland, she reported a radar contact at 19:50 at 8,000 yd (7,300 m), which placed it 7 mi (11 km) south of the convoy at 57°37′0″N 26°30′0″W. Assisted by the destroyer escort Joyce (Captained by Lt. Comdr. R. Wilcox, U.S. Coast Guard), Leopold was ordered to intercept. General Quarters was sounded and orders were issued to "fire on sight." A flare was released and gun crew strained to sight the submarine in the lighted area. The U-boat was almost submerged when spotted and the gun crews had to work blind. Leopold was struck by an acoustic torpedo fired from the German submarine U-255. Shortly after the torpedo strike, the crew of Leopold began to abandon ship as she broke in half.

Joyce rescued 28 survivors at the close of the action; 171 others were lost through the explosion on board, drowning, and – most of all – cold water immersion. Leopold's bow remained afloat until early the next morning until sunk as a hazard to navigation by gunfire from Joyce 400 miles south of Iceland.
