= Spair Flight 3601 =

1996 aviation accident

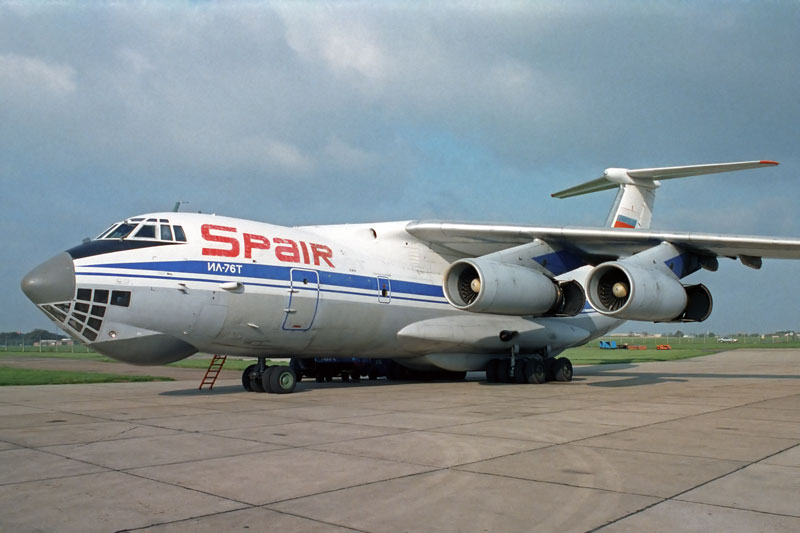
- RA-76513, the aircraft involved in the accident

Accident
- Date: August 19, 1996
- Summary: Electrical failure due to pilot error
- Site: Cornfield northeast of Belgrade International Airport, Belgrade, Federal Republic of Yugoslavia; 44.8313°N 20.2811°E

Aircraft
- Aircraft type: Ilyushin Il-76
- Operator: Spair
- Registration: RA-76513
- Flight origin: Ekaterinburg, Russia
- Stopover: Belgrade Airport, Serbia
- Destination: Malta International Airport, Malta
- Occupants: 11
- Passengers: 3
- Crew: 8
- Fatalities: 11
- Survivors: 0

Spair Flight 3601 (PAR-3601) was a cargo flight operated by an Ilyushin Il-76 between Yekaterinburg, Russia, and Malta International Airport, Malta. On 19 August 1996, the aircraft crashed into a corn field 1,500 metres (4,900 ft) northeast of Belgrade International Airport's runway in Yugoslavia, killing all 11 people on board.

== Aircraft ==
The aircraft was an 18-year-old Ilyushin Il-76T, registered as RA-76513 with serial number 083414451.

== Flight chronology ==
Flight 3601 departed from Ekaterinburg on August 18, 1996. The Il-76T landed at Belgrade International Airport for refueling and a routine check.

At around 23:00, the pilots started the engines at the gate but all electrical systems failed. The electrical malfunction was then repaired and the plane took off at 00:10 on August 19, 1996 heading for Malta. Although the malfunction had been repaired, the crew had improperly configured their electrical systems, resulting in those systems being fed solely off the aircraft's batteries. About 15 minutes after takeoff, as Flight 3601 reached Valjevo, Yugoslavia, the batteries began to drain completely. Pilot Vladimir Starikov contacted Belgrade air traffic control and said the plane was again having electrical system problems; that was the last contact air traffic control had with Flight 3601. The crew made several attempts to conduct an emergency landing at Belgrade, unsuccessful due to night and difficult weather conditions. During one of these attempts the aircraft crashed, killing all 8 crew and 3 passengers.

Flight 3601 appeared over Belgrade about one hour after take off. Many Belgrade residents saw the plane fly over the city and observed that there were no lights active on the aircraft. The weather over Belgrade was very bad that night with heavy clouds. Since there were no electricity aboard the aircraft, the only way to find the runway was by sight.

At about 01:30, Flight 3601 circled central Belgrade at a very low altitude; witnesses said that the plane was seen flying very low over New Belgrade. At 03:14, the flight crew tried to land, first making a 180-degree turn and then aiming for Runway 12 on a course of 121 degrees.

The aircraft plummeted into a corn field as it attempted an emergency landing at Belgrade International Airport, exploding and killing the Russian crew of 11. According to The New York Times, the aircraft was illegally carrying weapons for Libya.
