= Autorotation (fixed-wing aircraft) =

Aircraft in or near a stall rolling

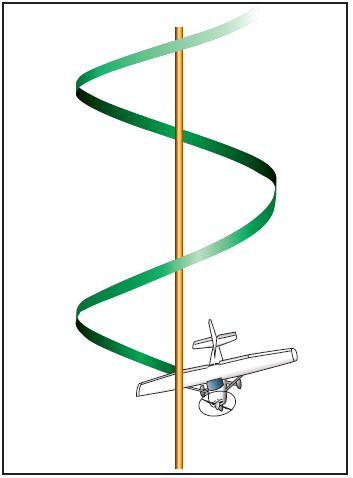
Spin — an aggravated stall and autorotation

For fixed-wing aircraft, autorotation is the tendency of an aircraft in or near a stall to roll spontaneously to the right or left, leading to a spin (a state of continuous autorotation).

== Details ==
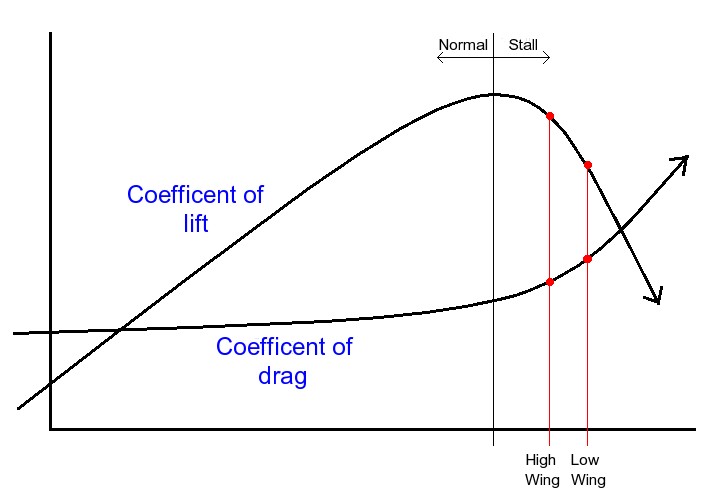
A typical graph of lift coefficient and drag coefficient versus angle of attack. At any angle of attack greater than the stalling angle an increase in angle of attack causes a reduction in lift coefficient, and a decrease in angle of attack causes an increase in lift coefficient.

When the angle of attack is less than the stalling angle, any increase in angle of attack causes an increase in lift coefficient that causes the wing to rise. As the wing rises the angle of attack and lift coefficient decrease which tend to restore the wing to its original angle of attack. Conversely any decrease in angle of attack causes a decrease in lift coefficient which causes the wing to descend. As the wing descends, the angle of attack and lift coefficient increase which tends to restore the wing to its original angle of attack. For this reason the angle of attack is stable when it is less than the stalling angle. The aircraft displays damping in roll.

When the wing is stalled and the angle of attack is greater than the stalling angle, any increase in angle of attack causes a decrease in lift coefficient that causes the wing to descend. As the wing descends the angle of attack increases, which causes the lift coefficient to decrease and the angle of attack to increase. Conversely any decrease in angle of attack causes an increase in lift coefficient that causes the wing to rise. As the wing rises the angle of attack decreases and causes the lift coefficient to increase further towards the maximum lift coefficient. For this reason the angle of attack is unstable when it is greater than the stalling angle. Any disturbance of the angle of attack on one wing will cause the whole wing to roll spontaneously and continuously.

When the angle of attack on the wing of an aircraft reaches the stalling angle the aircraft is at risk of autorotation. This will eventually develop into a spin if the pilot does not take corrective action.

== Autorotation in kites and gliders ==
1. Magnus effect rotating kites (wing flipping or wing tumbling) that have the rotation axis bluntly normal to the stream direction use autorotation; a net lift is possible that lifts the kite and payload to altitude. The Rotoplane, the UFO rotating kite, and the Skybow rotating ribbon arch kite use the Magnus effect resulting from the autorotating wing with rotation axis normal to the stream.
2. Some kites are equipped with autorotation wings.
3. Again, a third kind of autorotation occurs in self-rotating bols, rotating parachutes, or rotating helical objects sometimes used as kite tails or kite-line laundry. This kind of autorotation drives wind and water propeller-type turbines, sometimes used to generate electricity.
4. Unlocked engine-off aircraft propellers may autorotate. Such autorotation is being explored for generating electricity to recharge flight-driving batteries.

== See also ==
- Airborne wind turbine
- Küssner effect
- Autorotation (airborne wind energy)
