= Eckhard Märzke =

German footballer

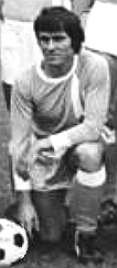
- Märzke in 1978

Personal information
- Date of birth: 7 December 1952 (age 73)
- Place of birth: Greifswald, East Germany
- Height: 1.70 m (5 ft 7 in)
- Position: Defender

Team information
- Current team: FC Pommern Greifswald (manager)

Youth career
- Lok Greifswald
- Einheit Greifswald
- –1970: BSG KKW Greifswald

Senior career*
Years	Team	Apps	(Gls)
1970–1979	F.C. Hansa Rostock	139	(8)
1981–1986	BSG Stahl Brandenberg	158	(1)
1987–1989	BSG Motor Ludwigsfelde		
1989–1991	TSV Chemie Premnitz		

International career
–1971	East Germany U-17	13	(0)

Managerial career
- 1991–2004: Brandenburger SC Süd 05
- 2004: SV Schwarz-Rot Neustadt
- 2004–2005: SV Lichtenberg 47
- 2005–2006: FC Stahl Brandenburg
- 2006–2008: Torgelower SV Greif
- 2010–: FC Pommern Greifswald
- * Club domestic league appearances and goals

Eckhard Märzke (also Eckhart and Eckart in other sources; born 7 December 1952) is a former East German football player and currently manager of FC Pommern Greifswald in the Verbandsliga Mecklenburg-Vorpommern (VI).

Märzke made 153 DDR-Oberliga appearances for F.C. Hansa Rostock and BSG Stahl Brandenberg, as well as a further four for the latter during the 1986–87 UEFA Cup campaign.
