= Millon Air Flight 406 =

1996 aircraft accident in Ecuador

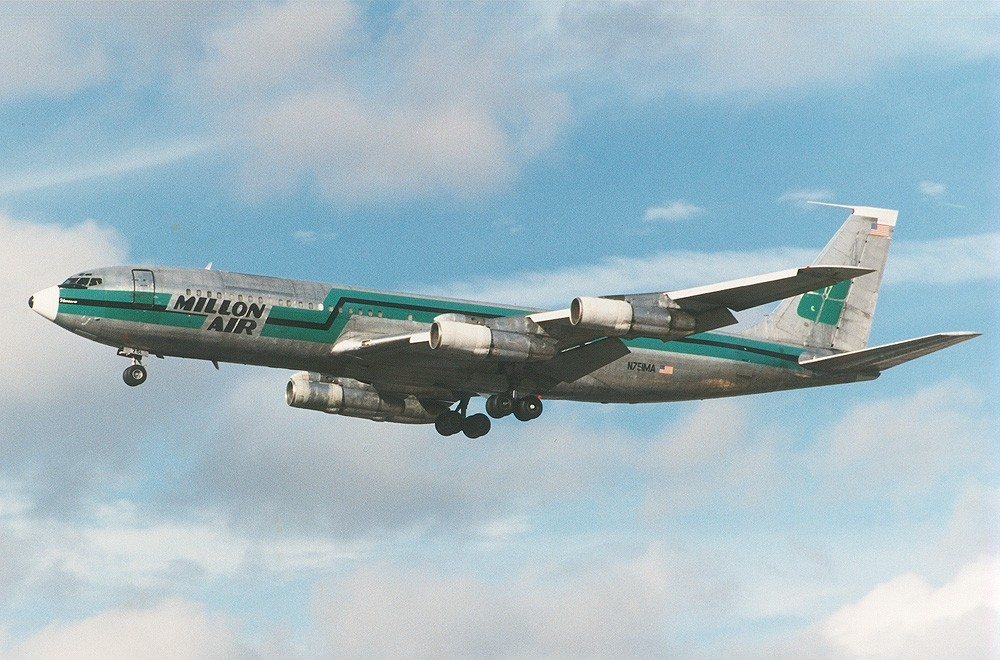
- N751MA, the aircraft involved in the accident, pictured in January 1996

Accident
- Date: October 22, 1996
- Summary: Engine failure on takeoff
- Site: Near Eloy Alfaro International Airport, Manta, Ecuador
- Total fatalities: 34
- Total injuries: 50

Aircraft
- Aircraft type: Boeing 707-323C
- Operator: Millon Air
- Registration: N751MA
- Flight origin: Eloy Alfaro International Airport, Manta, Ecuador
- Destination: Miami International Airport
- Occupants: 4
- Passengers: 1
- Crew: 3
- Fatalities: 4
- Injuries: 0
- Survivors: 0

Ground casualties
- Ground fatalities: 30
- Ground injuries: 50

Millon Air Flight 406 was an international cargo flight from Manta, Ecuador, to Miami, Florida. On October 22, 1996, the Boeing 707 crashed shortly after takeoff from Manta Airport, killing all four people on-board and 30 more people on the ground.

== Aircraft ==
The Boeing 707-323C (N751MA) involved in the accident was built in 1967 with serial number 19582 and was delivered to American Airlines on October 27. It was sold to Millon Air in October 1989. N751MA was involved in at least two previous incidents. The first was in 1995, when an engine failed 35 minutes after takeoff. On February 22, 1996, about eight months before the accident, the plane lost hydraulic fluid while en route from Manaus, Brazil to Miami. The aircraft landed at Miami International Airport with its nose landing gear retracted. According to Federal Aviation Administration (FAA) records, the aircraft was in poor condition with corrosion and cracks.

== Accident ==
The aircraft captain, Erwin Roedenbeck, had been working for Millon Air for three years and was also qualified as a flight instructor. Also on board were 23-year-old first officer Henry Ripoll, 30-year-old flight engineer Ernesto Enciso, and a loadmaster. Flight 406 carried cargo, including frozen fish.

At 21:44 CDT, Flight 406 took off from Runway 23. The aircraft quickly lost altitude and struck the bell tower of the La Dolorosa Catholic Church. The aircraft then crashed into a residential area near the airport and exploded, scattering debris over dozens of homes. The accident killed all four people on board, along with at least 24 (or 30) people on the ground, including a priest from the church. 50 people were also injured.

== Investigation ==
Ecuador's Directorate General of Civil Aviation investigated the accident with assistance from the National Transportation Safety Board, the Federal Aviation Administration (FAA), Boeing, and Pratt & Whitney. The plane's flight data recorder reportedly presented unspecified malfunctions that impeded "precise and full readouts of its data." The device was reportedly retrofitted into the aircraft and also lacked adequate documentation. It was eventually determined that the accident was caused by a failure of engine No. 3 seconds after takeoff.

Miami-based Millon Air had several maintenance violations. The FAA issued it more than 50 warnings over a ten-year period, and it paid $49,000 in fines. A year earlier, a Douglas DC-8-54F leased to Faucett Perú crashed in Guatemala City, killing six people. After the accident, Millon Air voluntarily ceased operations while the Ecuadorian state announced legal action and suspended the airline's operations.
