= Bo-Dzhausa Mountain =

Volcanic mountain in Primorye, Russia

Highest point
- Elevation: 1,637 metres (5,371 ft)
- Coordinates: 48°08′N 138°39′E

Geography
- Location: Terneysky District, Primorsky Krai, Russia
- Parent range: Sikhote-Alin

Geology
- Mountain type: Sopka

Bo-Dzhausa Mountain (Russian: Бо-Джауса) is a volcanic mountain in Primorsky Krai, Russia, and a part of the Sikhote-Alin mountain range. The nearest inhabited place is the coastal village of Grossevichi. Bo-Dzhausa is accessible from the towns of Dalnegorsk and Sovetskaya Gavan.

In December 1995, Khabarovsk United Air Group Flight 3949 crashed in the area. The site is commemorated with an obelisk.
