= LoFLYTE =

American technology demonstrator stealth aircraft

LoFlyte (Low Observable Flight Test Experiment) is a supersonic / hypersonic unmanned technology demonstrator stealth aircraft, designed in a joint effort between the US Air Force and NASA to test the characteristics of hypersonic vehicles at low speeds and low altitudes. It first flew in 1996. Built by Accurate Automation.

== See also ==
- NASA X-43
- Boeing X-51
