= Khabarovsk United Air Group Flight 3949 =

1995 aviation accident

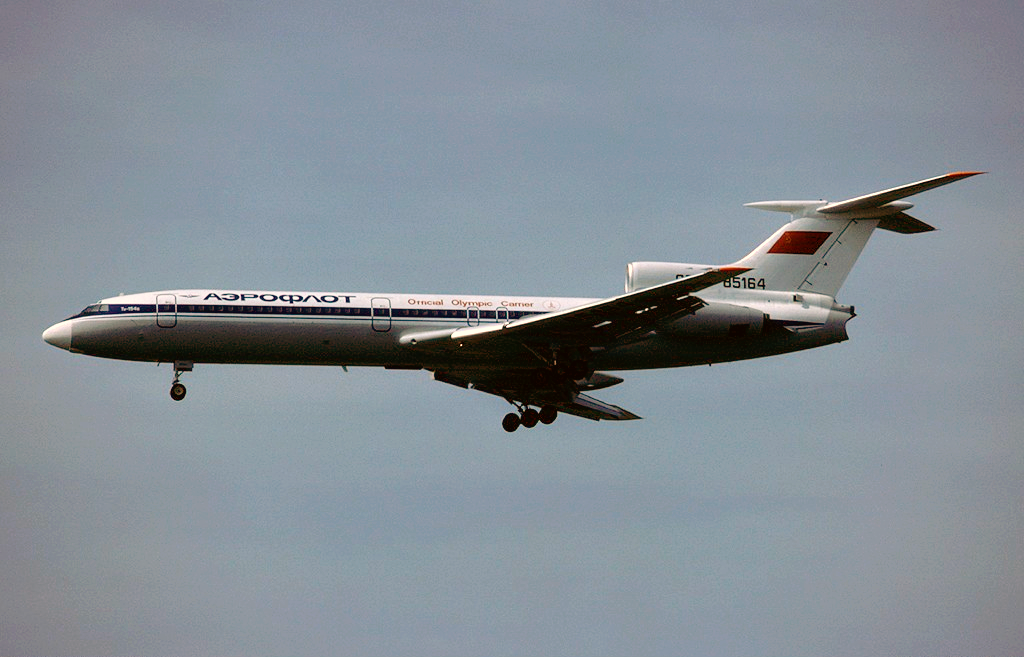
- The aircraft involved in the accident while in service with Aeroflot in 1979.

Accident
- Date: 7 December 1995
- Summary: Loss of control
- Site: Bo-Dzhausa Mountain; 48°08′32″N 138°50′38″E

Aircraft
- Aircraft type: Tupolev Tu-154B-1
- Operator: Khabarovsk United Air Group
- IATA flight No.: DA3949
- ICAO flight No.: KHV3949
- Registration: RA-85164
- Flight origin: Khabarovsk Novy Airport, Khabarovsk, Russia
- 1st stopover: Yuzhno-Sakhalinsk Airport, Yuzhno-Sakhalinsk, Russia
- 2nd stopover: Khabarovsk Novy Airport, Khabarovsk, Russia
- Last stopover: Baikal International Airport, Ulan-Ude, Russia
- Destination: Tolmachevo Airport, Novosibirsk, Russia
- Occupants: 98
- Passengers: 90
- Crew: 8
- Fatalities: 98
- Survivors: 0

Khabarovsk United Air Group Flight 3949 was a Russian domestic passenger flight from Yuzhno-Sakhalinsk to Khabarovsk, that crashed on 7 December 1995 local time (6 December UTC), killing all ninety-eight people aboard. The crash occurred after the aircraft had entered into a steep downward spiral during automated flight at an altitude of 10,600 metres (34,800 ft).

Investigation by Russian Interstate Aviation Committee (IAC) concluded that the crash was caused by a combination of mechanical failure, pilot error and design flaw. The aircraft had instantaneously banked to the left shortly after taking off due to mechanical failure. The crew resorted to conduct a fuel transfer from the left tank to the right tank, creating imbalance towards the right. The crew were unaware that the aircraft had banked to the right. Without proper monitoring and lack of alarm, the aircraft managed to enter a heavy turn to the right, spiralling down without any possible recovery and crashed at high-speed.

The crash was the second accident involving the Tupolev Tu-154 aircraft in nearly two years, after the crash of Baikal Airlines Flight 130 in January 1994. It was also the second major Russian air disaster involving a jet airliner within a year, after the Vanavara air disaster. The aircraft operator, Khabarovsk United Air Group, was later rebranded to Dalavia and became defunct in 2008.

== Aircraft ==
The aircraft Tupolev Tu-154B-1, involved in the accident, was manufactured on 30 July 1976 under a serial number 76А164. Like other former Soviet aircraft, it was previously registered as USSR-85164, being operated by the flag carrier of USSR, Aeroflot. Following the Soviet Union dissolution in 1991, the aircraft was re-registered as RA-85164 and was sent to Khabarovsk United Air Group, though the livery would not be changed from the former operator.

Prior to the accident the Tupolev Tu-154 had accumulated 30,001 flight hours and undergone four repairs, the last one on 23 September 1991. During the last maintenance, two of its engines were replaced. Following said maintenance, the aircraft had a tendency to roll to the left without any command from the pilots. The issue was not rectified and pilots kept flying with the unresolved problem.

== Passengers and crew ==
The aircraft was carrying 90 passengers and 8 crew members, including 5 children and 1 infant. The list of nationalities of those on board was not disclosed.

At the time of the accident, the flight crew were consisted of:

- The commander of the flight was 46-year-old Captain Viktor Konstantinovich Sumarokov. Graduated from Buguruslan Flying School, he had accrued a total flying experience of more than 12,000 hours, of which 5,054 hours were on the Tupolev Tu-154. He had never been involved in any accidents or incidents during his flights in the past.
- The second-in-command was 43-year-old First officer Stanislav Aleksandrovich Revedovich. Graduated from Omsk Aviation Academy, he had accrued a total flying experience of around 10,000 hours, of which 1,620 hours were on the Tupolev Tu-154. He had been involved in an incident during landing in Irkutsk in 1994.

The other flight crews were 32-year-old Navigator Alexander Alekseevich Martynov with a flying experience of 5,008 hours, including 1,990 hours on the Tupolev Tu-154; and 30-year-old Flight engineer Grigory Alekseevich Moroz with a flying experience of 1,816 hours, all of which were on the Tupolev Tu-154.

== Sequence of events ==
=== Flight ===
The flight was the second leg of a round-trip flight from Khabarovsk to Yuzhno-Sakhalinsk, back to Khabarovsk before continuing to Novosibirsk with an intermediate stop in Ulan-Ude. During the trip to Yuzhno-Sakhalinsk, the flight was initially scheduled to take off at 16:45 local time, but due to deteriorating weather conditions, the flight was delayed for several hours. The aircraft eventually took off at around 23:00 local time with no passengers. During the flight, the aircraft was progressively banking to the left, causing the crew to constantly make a right bank input to stabilise the aircraft. They managed to level the wings, and the flight proceeded to its destination without any further incident.

The aircraft landed in Yuzhno-Sakhalinsk Airport at 00:34 local time and was parked for approximately 2 hours. First Officer Revidovich would be the pilot flying, while Captain Sumarokov would be the one handling the comms. The aircraft took off at 02:43 a.m with 90 passengers. The takeoff weight was within acceptable limits, at 82,600 kilograms (182,100 lb), and the fuel weight was 15,100 kilograms (33,300 lb).

=== Start of failure ===
During the climb, the aircraft instantaneously began a progressive bank towards the left. The crew, who had faced similar situations on prior flights, simply rolled the aircraft's control column to the right to level the wings. However, the aircraft kept banking towards the left, causing the control column to be turned even more to the right to prevent the aircraft from rolling over. It eventually reached an angle greater than the crew could normally handle, at one point reaching an angle of 30 degrees.

Seeing the significant asymmetry, Captain Sumarokov opined that they should work with a fuel transfer from the left wing tank to the right wing tank to counteract the bank angle, which was agreed upon by all of the crew. The crew had faced the same situation on prior flights, and the same exact action, commencing a fuel transfer, had been done before. On those flights, they successfully managed to balance the aircraft. After completing the transfer, the crew continued the flight.

The autopilot, which had been engaged earlier, sensed that the aircraft began to turn towards the right instead, causing the system to deflect the control column to the left. The bank angle, however, became progressively steeper, reaching 15 degrees. Exceeding the maximum angle that the autopilot could handle, the bank angle could not be controlled any longer, and the aircraft turned further to the right. The crew was conducting the pre-landing checklist and didn't notice that the aircraft had turned to the right instead of the left.

=== Plunge ===
As the pilots were diverting their attention to the pre-landing checklist, the bank angle continued to increase. It eventually reached an angle of more than 30 degree, prompting the aircraft's system to alert the crew on the issue by illuminating the warning lights. Both crew didn't react to the lights, but Captain Sumarokov sensed that something was wrong as the large bank angle had caused him to sense that the aircraft was excessively banking, causing him to order First Officer Revidovich to "slow down".

03:07:35	Captain	What are you doing, huh? Slow down!
03:07:36	Captain	Hold on! Turn off the autopilot!
03:07:39	First Officer	I see! It's leaving [the route]!
03:07:45	Captain	Well? What's there?
03:07:46	First Officer	Bank!
03:07:47	Captain	What the f...? Where to?!
03:07:48	First Officer	Bank! Bank! Bank! Big bank [angle]!

Captain Sumarokov eventually asked the autopilot to be turned off, but the aircraft kept banking. It somehow turned even faster to the right, reaching 2 degree per seconds. After reaching 45 degree, the control column was deflected to the left, but the angle kept increasing. Captain Sumarokov was perplexed by the situation and asked his fellow crew on what had happened on the aircraft. First Officer Revidovich told him that the aircraft was turning to the right, and with an angle larger than usual.

As the aircraft kept turning, it gained more speed. Exceeding the upper limit of the airspeed that the aircraft could handle, the overspeed alarm blared. The crew, realizing that the aircraft was in danger of crashing, tried to reduce the list by making a turn of approximately 45 degree to the left on the control column. The aircraft didn't budge, and instead it kept listing to the right.

03:07:49	Commentary	Sound of overspeed alarm
03:07:50	First Officer	Bank is too big!
03:07:51	Captain	Reduce the bank!
03:07:52	First Officer	Speed is high!
03:07:53	Captain	Y... mother. Where are we right now? System one!
03:07:55	First Officer	Bank! Can't you see?!
03:07:57	Captain	Which way are you banking?!
03:08:58	First Officer	Can't you see the bank?
03:08:01	Flight Engineer	Speed! Speed!
03:08:02	First Officer	What is the speed?
03:08:03	Captain	Correct the bank! Take your time! Slowly, slowly!

=== Crash ===
External videos
- In-flight recordings
- Partial CVR recording of the flight on YouTube
- Partial FDR recording of the flight on YouTube

The aircraft continued to plunge to the ground at a terrific speed of at least 100 meters per second. Desperate, the crew frantically moved the control column in every direction to counter the increasing right bank. They had lost all sense of spatial orientation, and all of their attempts to save the aircraft failed. The aircraft continued to spiral down and gained more speed. The flight crew had lost all control of their aircraft.

03:08:06	Commentary	Sounds of bank angle alarm
03:08:12	Captain	We're falling! We're falling!
03:08:14	First Officer	Altitude! E-e-e-e!
03:08:16	Captain	That's it, fuck! That's it, fuck!
03:08:19	First Officer	Well...
03:08:20	Commentary	Sound of impact
03:08:21		End of recording

The aircraft crashed into Bo-Dzhausa Mountain with a vertical speed of about 300 m/s and a pitch angle of about 70 degrees. The aircraft disintegrated into numerous fragments. All 98 people on board were killed instantly upon impact.

== Response ==
The aircraft was cruising at 10,600 metres (34,800 ft) (according to the investigation report; alternatively, at 9,600 metres (31,500 ft).) and disappeared from radar shortly after making a routine ATC report. The last contact with ATC was made on 03:00 a.m. local time (17:00 UTC). At the time, Flight 3949 was at a distance of approximately 160 km from Khabarovsk. It eventually missed its estimated time of arrival at 03:45 local time. Nearly an hour later, the search and rescue operation commenced. An Antonov An-12 and a Russian Air Force Antonov An-26 were deployed to scour the site for the missing aircraft but were later called off by midnight as they couldn't find the crash site due to heavy snow and low visibility.

Radio Moscow initially reported that the wreckage, which was claimed to have been in flames, had been spotted approximately 120 km from Khabarovsk. The report was denied by the Russian Ministry of Emergency Situations.

Villagers in Koppi reported that they had heard low-flying aircraft in the vicinity, meanwhile in Grossevichi there were claims that the aircraft had crashed within the village. Multiple personnel were deployed to the area, but no traces of the aircraft could be found. The search area was eventually widened, reaching the Tatar Strait. Multiple ships were sent to scour the area for any wreckage of the aircraft.

On 9 December, Deputy Prime Minister of Russia Oleg Soskovets arrived in Khabarovsk to observe and supervise the search and rescue operation. A total of 22 ships were deployed to the Tatar Strait. According to authorities, a Tupolev Tu-134 aircraft equipped with metal-detecting technology would be involved in the search. The Russian Ministry of Defense also announced that they would assist the operation by using satellite imagery, in hopes of finding the wreckage.

Paratroopers had been deployed by the Russian Army to assist the operation. Rescuers eventually managed to find some debris before realizing that it had belonged to other airliner accidents that had happened prior to the crash of Flight 3949. A total of 14,000 square meters of areas had been scoured to search the wreckage. However, there were still no signs of the wreckage. Satellite imagery in the area suggested that some wreckages were spotted near Berezovaya, though this was later confirmed to be not true. Other reports, which stated that the wreckage had been spotted following the discovery of oil slicks in the north of the Sea of Japan and claims of smoke being seen in Sukpai, were dismissed by officials.

Getting desperate after days of no results in finding the crash site, authorities asked the assistance of then-famous Russian clairvoyant Juna, who told them that the search area should have been widened. She indicated that the crash site was located within an area twice as large as the area that had been searched by the rescuers, near the Samarga River. However, after an extensive search, the crew found no luck with the pinpointed site.

The crash site was found by chance on 18 December 1995, on the Sikhote-Alin Ridge of Bo-Dzhausa Mountain, by the crew of a Vostok Aviation Company Mil Mi-8 pilot who didn't even take part in the operation. While making an emergency landing at a taiga, he noticed that the soil on a nearby mountain had different colors than the rest and a part of the fuselage could be seen protruding from the ground. He later reported it to authorities, who subsequently awarded him the Nesterov medal due to the finding.

Later reports suggested that rescuers had flown over the crash site for at least four times but couldn't find it due to inclement weather and rocky terrain.

The crash left a crater 6 ft deep and 70 ft wide. The crash site suggested that the aircraft had impacted the mountain at a terrific speed, as there were barely any recognizable pieces of wreckage. The site was strewn with bits of human tissues and personal belongings that had been shredded to small pieces due to the force of the impact. More than 50 personnel were sent to recover the bodies of the victims.

Authorities stated that relatives who wished to visit the site would be assigned to a special flight.

The Russian aviation industry was immediately put into the spotlight following the crash, as it was the fifth air disaster in just a week and the second major air disaster in less than 22 months. The crash caused further strain on the industry as, coincidentally, the Federation of Air Traffic Controllers' Trade Union was planning to hold an indefinite worker's strike within a week after. Russian media Kommersant stated that the then-aviation surveillance system was inadequate and inefficient to handle the industry in the country, which had just been growing exponentially following the dissolution of the USSR.

About two months after the crash, Russian authorities ordered the grounding of all Tupolev Tu-154Bs throughout the country, following findings that an unknown mechanical error might have caused the crash by making the aircraft to unintentionally bank to the right without the crew noticing. All Tupolev Tu-154Bs are to be grounded until the investigation is completed.

== Investigation ==
=== Preliminary investigation ===
The crash site suggested that the aircraft might have impacted terrain at high speed due to the size of the crater and the distribution of the wreckage, likely crashing with its nose first. Authorities initially didn't rule out an in-flight explosion or an explosive decompression but stated that a mechanical failure was the most likely suspect for the cause of the crash. The crew didn't issue a mayday call, and the last radio contact didn't indicate any distress from the pilots.

The flight recorders were found on the same day when the wreckage was found, both of which were considerably damaged by the impact. The housing was crumpled and the tapes inside had cuts and ruptures. Decoding of the stored information could only be done in fragments.

=== Cause of crash ===
During the climb, the aircraft banked instantaneously to the left without any input from the crew due to a fault in one of its flight control systems, and as a result, the crew had to maintain a constant right bank input. The bothersome problem led Captain Sumarokov to opine that they should use the same method that had been applied earlier to counteract such left bank by conducting a fuel transfer, as it had resulted in multiple successes when the aircraft encountered the exact same problem in previous flights. The aircraft manual didn't specify the actions that the crew should take when such problems occur, and hence said move would be deemed a non-standard procedure. Despite this, the crew agreed with Sumarokov's idea and decided to follow through with it.

The transfer from the left tank and middle tank produced rolling forces to the right. Asymmetrical fuel transfer was not prohibited, as long as it was still within the tolerated limits. The instruments gave information that the amount of fuel imbalance between the tanks was minimal. Likely due to faulty gauge reading, the crew didn't notice that they had pumped fuel of more than the allowable amount to the right tank, which had already been filled with more than 3,600 kg of fuel. The left tank, meanwhile, was only filled with less than 1,000 kg.

The autopilot was initially able to counteract the unwanted left bank, but due to the addition of fuel into the right tank, the rolling forces to the right exceeded the forces that the system could control, and hence the aircraft started to bank right instead. When the aircraft started to bank to the right, it was unfortunately not noticed by the crew as they didn't think that there was anything wrong and thought that the autopilot was working normally, aggravated by the fact that they were focusing on the pre-landing checklist.

When the bank had reached an angle large enough to alert the pilots, they weren't able to identify which way it had banked. Add to the pitch-black sky; the crew could not make sense of their spatial orientation. Instead of working together, they kept panicking with the state of their aircraft, which was getting nearer to the ground by the minute. The crew was not trained in handling spatial orientation, which led to Cockpit Resource Management (CRM) breakdown, eventually causing them to be unable to resolve the issue.

=== Further deficiencies ===
The instantaneous banking to the left was attributed to an improperly installed aileron part of the control system of the Tupolev Tu-154. The part had been substituted from another aircraft of the same type for cost-saving reasons. The result of the maintenance was not checked, and there were only few test flights that had been conducted on the aircraft. The failure was not detected by the maintenance workers. By the time pilots noticed the failure and filed complaints, the company eliminated those comments and ignored their concerns altogether.

The flight manual didn't add the steps that the crew should have taken in case such a situation occurred; hence, the crew opted to use the procedure that they had taken before, which was proven to be successful. The fuel transfer method was non-standard, though not prohibited. The aircraft involved in the accident, however, had faulty fuel gauge readings, causing the pilots to be unable to accurately know the amount of fuel that they had moved to the other tanks. Even though the crew conducted asymmetric fuel transfer, such practice was not considered abnormal as it was common for the operation of the Tupolev Tu-154. The procedure was permissible as long as the aircraft's balance remained within the considerable tolerance.

As soon as the aircraft entered a steep right bank, the crew immediately lost their spatial orientation. Years before the crash, the Tupolev Tu-154 aircraft had been equipped with an audible alarm that would have alerted the crew on the large bank angle. However, in 1986 authorities decided to remove it entirely from the aircraft. The lack of an alarm might have contributed to the crew's lack of rapid intervention to the aircraft's sudden change in bank angle.

=== Conclusion ===
The investigation listed five possible causes, whose combination might have led to the crash. It is believed that in order to counteract the left-wing low flying tendency fuel-feed was selected from left wing fuel tanks only. The fuel imbalance likely caused the aircraft to bank to the right and the autopilot was able to counteract it for 35 minutes after take-off.

The investigation report further criticized the navigational operation in the region, which was severely deficient. The radar operating the Khabarovsk region was damaged following the passage of a recent storm. The radio-technical support, however, was not used by workers. The conversation between the pilots and the ATC was not recorded due to a failure within the tape. The aircraft was not actively tracked by the worker who was on duty, and there was barely any communication from ATC and workers from Air Defence following the disappearance of the aircraft.

In response to the accident, an audible bank angle alarm would be re-installed to the Tupolev Tu-154 aircraft.

== See also ==
- Sriwijaya Air Flight 182
