= List of airports in Croatia =

Civil airports in Croatia

This is a list of airports in Croatia, grouped by type and sorted by location.

== Airports ==
Airport names shown in bold indicate the airport has scheduled service on commercial airlines.

City served	ICAO	IATA	Airport name	Location
**Civil airports**				
Brač	LDSB	BWK	**Brač Airport**	43.2858330800°N 16.6797220300°E
Dubrovnik	LDDU	DBV	**Dubrovnik Airport**	42.5622383800°N 18.2657594100°E
Mali Lošinj	LDLO	LSZ	Lošinj Airport	44.5655036300°N 14.3979867300°E
Osijek	LDOS	OSI	**Osijek Airport**	45.4589001100°N 18.8232948400°E
Pula	LDPL	PUY	**Pula Airport**	44.8926854400°N 13.9166197000°E
Rijeka	LDRI	RJK	**Rijeka Airport**	45.2198913100°N 14.5674886900°E
Split	LDSP	SPU	**Split Airport**	43.5385091500°N 16.2985301000°E
Zadar	LDZD	ZAD	**Zadar Airport**	44.0944431800°N 15.3528740800°E
Zagreb	LDZA	ZAG	**Zagreb Airport**	45.7383556500°N 16.0606726300°E
**Sport airports**				
Čakovec	LDVC		Sport Airport Čakovec	
Čepin	LDOC		Sport Airport Čepin	
Grobnik	LDRG		Sport Airport Grobničko Polje	
Hvar	LDSH		Sport Airport Hvar	
Ivanić Grad			Sport Airport Ivanić	
Koprivnica	LDVK		Sport Airport Koprivnica	
Lučko	LDZL		Lučko Airfield	
Otočac	LDRO		Sport Airport Otočac	
Sinj	LDSS		Sport Airport Sinj	
Sisak	LDZS		Sport Airport Šašna Greda	
Slavonski Brod	LDOR		Sport Airport Slavonski Brod	
Varaždin	LDVA	QRD	Sport Airport Varaždin	
Vrsar	LDPV		Sport Airport Vrsar	
Zabok	LDZK		Sport Airport Zabok	
**Military airports**				
Divulje	LDHD			
Udbina	LDZU		Udbina Airport	
Zaton			Šepurine Training Base	

== See also ==
- Transport in Croatia
- List of airports by ICAO code: L § LD – Croatia
