= List of the busiest airports in Croatia =

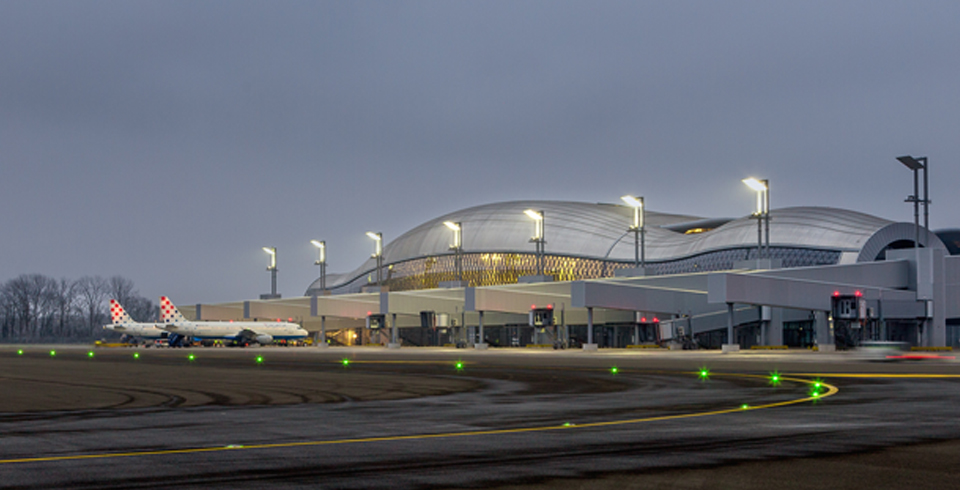
Zagreb Airport, with over 4.7 million passengers in 2025, makes it the busiest airport in Croatia

The following are lists of busiest airports in Croatia ranked by total passenger traffic, compiled from Croatian Civil Aviation Agency data from 2017 to 2025.

Croatia is home to some of Europe's busiest airports. Zagreb Airport, which handled over 4.7 million passengers in 2025, is the largest airport in Croatia. Zagreb also serves as the largest cargo hub in the country. Airports in Croatia welcomed more than 13 million passengers in 2024 and more than 14 million passengers in 2025.

The other larger airports by passenger traffic are Split Airport and Dubrovnik Airport which served 3.8 and 3 million passengers respectively, in 2025.

== By passenger traffic ==
Rank	Airport	City / town	IATA	ICAO	2017	2018	2019	2020	2021	2022	2023	2024	2025
1	Zagreb Airport	Zagreb	ZAG	LDZA	3,092,047	3,366,310	3,435,531	913,703	1,404,478	2,876,869	3,723,650	4,316,619	4,721,563
2	Split Airport	Split	SPU	LDSP	2,818,176	3,124,067	3,301,930	659,350	1,577,584	2,871,387	3,358,902	3,624,150	3,881,186
3	Dubrovnik Airport	Dubrovnik	DBV	LDDU	2,323,065	2,539,412	2,896,277	322,601	927,934	2,130,526	2,416,818	2,954,934	3,090,245
4	Zadar Airport	Zadar	ZAD	LDZD	589,841	603,819	801,347	111,179	513,093	1,101,089	1,230,835	1,593,413	1,639,167
5	Pula Airport	Pula	PUY	LDPL	595,812	717,187	777,568	78,832	264,093	392,890	424,000	509,397	542,315
6	Rijeka Airport	Rijeka	RJK	LDRI	142,111	183,606	200,841	25,460	56,388	162,657	154,367	145,148	160,249
7	Osijek Airport	Osijek	OSI	LDOS	43,373	67,235	46,361	6,382	11,515	14,519	36,791	45,756	42,963
8	Brač Airport	Brač	BWK	LDSB	21,596	30,170	25,339	3,369	8,061	15,935	19,073	22,360	17,518
9	Lošinj Airport	Mali Lošinj	LSZ	LDLO	6,042	6,939	6,495	1,156	5,835	3,265	1,756	1,554	1,990
TOTAL					9,632,423	10,637,848	11,491,689	2,122,032	4,768,981	9,569,137	11,366,192	13,213,331	14,097,196
