= Croatia Airlines =

Flag carrier of Croatia; based in Zagreb

Croatia Airlines Ltd.

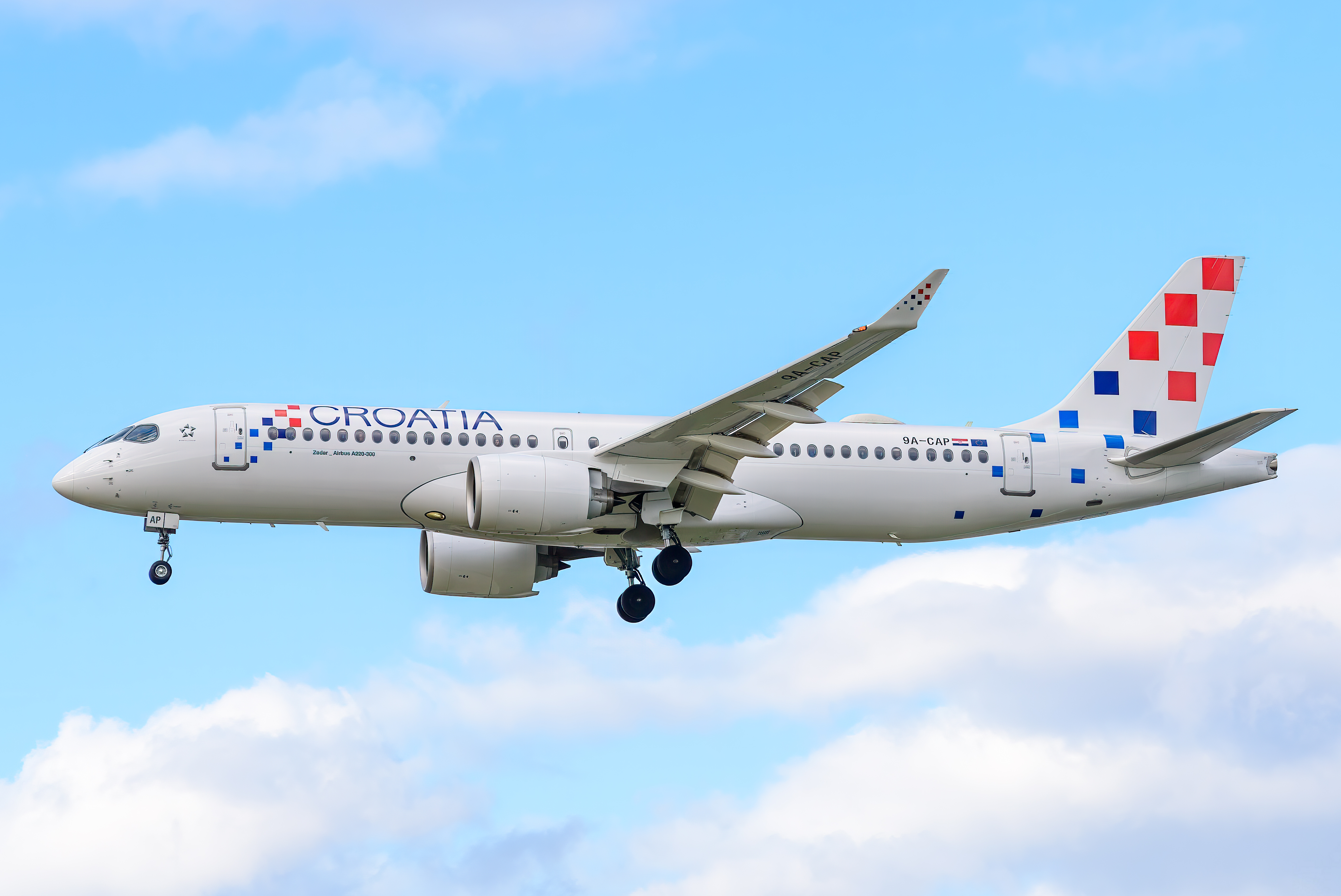
- Airbus A220-300
IATA	ICAO	Call sign
OU	CTN	CROATIA
- Founded: 7 August 1989; 37 years ago (as Zagal - Zagreb Airlines)
- Hubs: Zagreb
- Focus cities: Dubrovnik; Split; Zadar
- Frequent-flyer program: Miles & More
- Alliance: Star Alliance
- Subsidiaries: Amadeus Croatia; Obzor Holidays
- Fleet size: 19
- Destinations: 31
- Headquarters: Zagreb, Croatia
- Key people: Jasmin Bajić (President and CEO)
- Employees: 994 (31 December 2025)
- Website: www.croatiaairlines.com

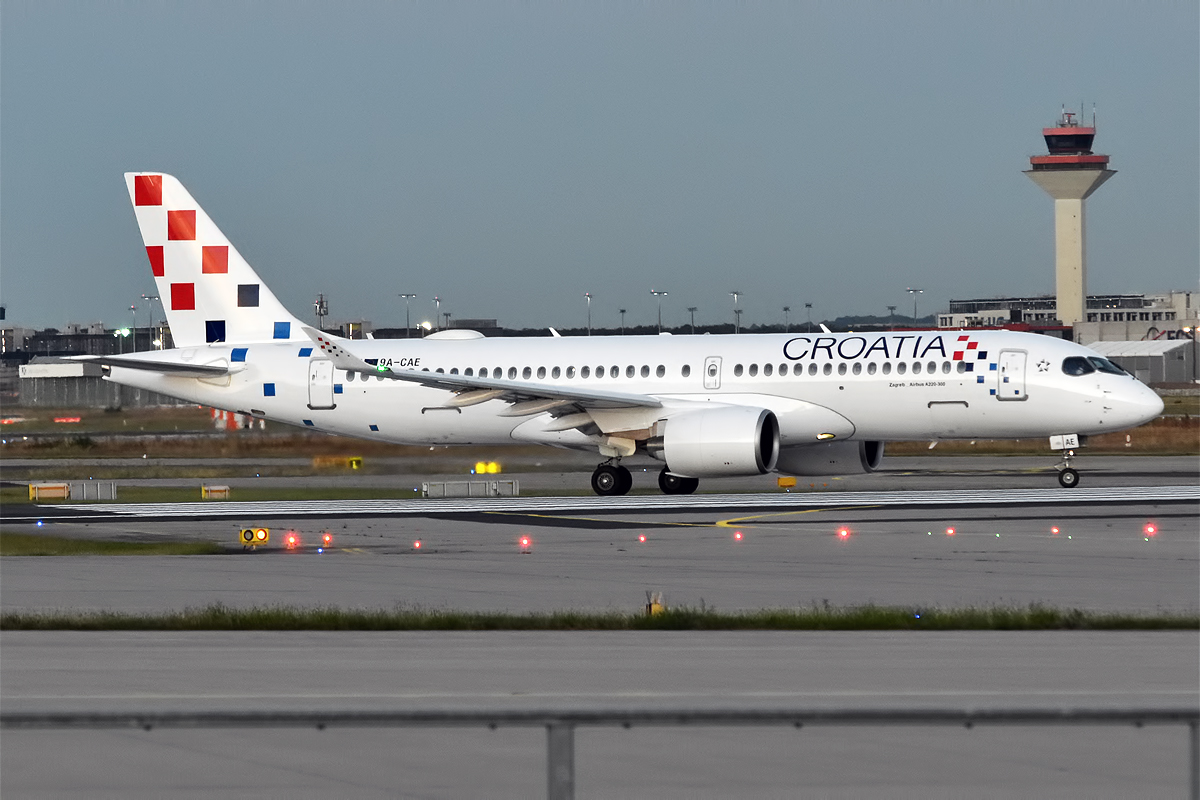
Airbus A220

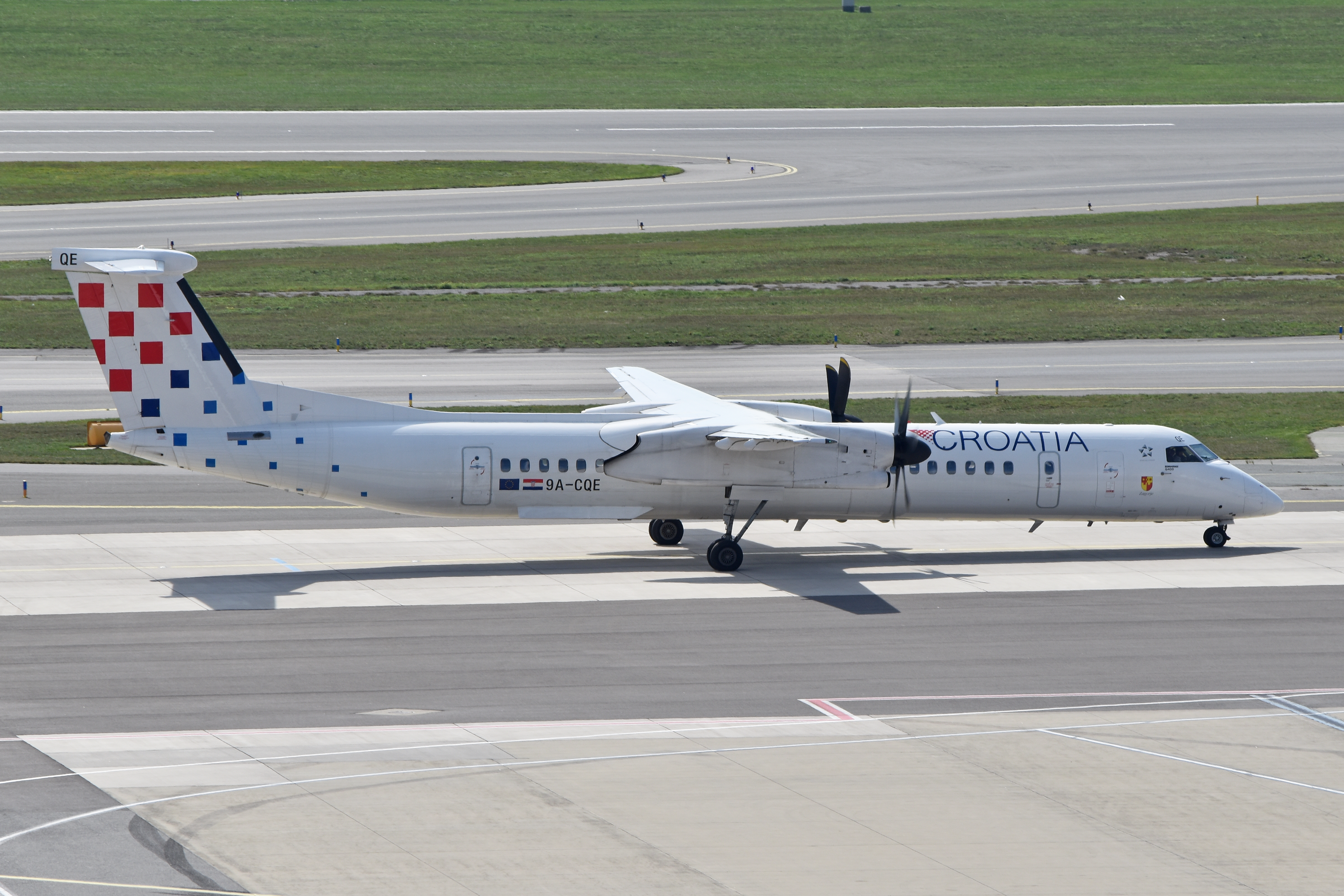
De Havilland Canada Dash 8-Q400

Croatia Airlines Ltd. is the flag carrier of Croatia. Its headquarters are in the Zagreb neighborhood of Buzin and operates domestic and international services mainly to European destinations. Its main hub is Zagreb Airport with focus cities being Dubrovnik, Split, and Zadar. Since November 2004, the airline has been a member of Star Alliance.

== History ==
=== Early years ===
Established on 7 August 1989, as Zagal - Zagreb Airlines it started operations with a single twin-engined Cessna 402 aircraft on 18 September of that same year. Apart from private flights some operations were just freight runs. After the very first democratic election in Croatia (May 1990) the airline was renamed Croatia Airlines on 23 June 1990. Despite this in 1991 no commercial planes were at hand and the concern seemed to have poor economic prospects. Later in that year, Croatia Airlines signed an agreement with Adria Airways which allowed it to lease a McDonnell Douglas MD-82 to commence domestic jet services between Zagreb and Split in the month of May. Croatia Airlines acquired three Boeing 737s from Lufthansa and became a member of the International Air Transport Association (IATA). As the flag carrier of newly independent Croatia, the airline launched its first international service on 5 April 1992, from Zagreb to Frankfurt.

In 1993, two new ATR 42s and two more 737s joined the fleet and representative offices were opened in several European cities and the company bought the travel agency Obzor to organize travel packages for groups and individuals. By 1994, Croatia Airlines had welcomed its millionth passenger. Later that year, Pope John Paul II flew the airline on a trip to Croatia.

In 1995, another ATR 42 was welcomed, as was the two millionth passenger. In 1996, Croatia Airlines became the first airline to fly to Sarajevo after the Bosnian War. In 1997, the airline's first Airbus A320 arrived and was named Rijeka. In 1998, another first plane of a new type arrived when the airline's first Airbus A319 joined the fleet. This airplane was named Zadar. In the same year, Croatia Airlines became a member of the Association of European Airlines (AEA). By 1999, two more Airbus jets had arrived and Croatia Airlines started selling the Boeing part of their fleet. The airline flew its five millionth passenger.

=== Development since 2000 ===
In 2000, two more Airbus planes arrived and an automated ticketing system was inaugurated. In 2001, the airline received maintenance and technical performing certificates from the German aviation authority Luftfahrt-Bundesamt. On 18 November 2004, Croatia Airlines joined Star Alliance.

Airbus and Croatia Airlines announced on 22 October 2008 the order of four additional 132-seat A319 aircraft, to be delivered from 2013. By March 2009, the airline also retired its fleet of three ATR 42 short-haul aircraft, after operating the type since 1993, and replaced it with a fleet of six Bombardier Dash 8 Q400s, the first of which was delivered in May 2008.

The airline carried its 20,000,000th passenger in July 2009, and has carried well over 1 million passengers annually from 2000.

Croatia Airlines and maintenance partner Lufthansa announced on 23 May 2011 the introduction of new slim-line Recaro economy seats to be retrofitted into certain A320 Family aircraft from summer 2012, increasing seating capacity by two rows.

Losses have been made for several years; in November 2012, the government announced that it would provide HRK 800m ($ 136m) for Croatia Airlines to become cost-effective from 2013 on. The government is seeking to restructure the airline, which includes plans to cut its workforce by ten percent within two years and it is also looking for a strategic investor.

In February 2020, Croatia Airlines announced two new seasonal flights to Podgorica and Sofia operated by Bombardier Dash 8 Q400.

In April 2024, Croatia Airlines concluded an agreement on the lease of an Airbus A319 aircraft with the Croatian airline Fly Air41, which is otherwise a sister company to SundAir.

=== Fleet renewal ===
In October 2022, Croatia Airlines announced plans to reduce their fleet and replace all current aircraft with six new Airbus A220-300 by 2026. The airline decided against the competing Embraer E2 as it was able to use downpayments for a former and since cancelled orders for Airbus A319s nearly 15 years ago. In November 2022, it has been stated that the airline will operate up to 15 A220 aircraft with 9 additional aircraft to be leased. In January 2023, a lease was agreed for the first six aircraft of four A220-300 aircraft and two A220-100 aircraft. The lease was concluded with Air Lease Corporation Clover based in the Republic of Ireland as the lessor.

In September 2023, Croatia Airlines sold and leased back its entire Airbus fleet from lessor World Star Aviation. Four Airbus A319 and one Airbus A320 were sold prior to the Airbus A220 delivery. In November 2023, Croatia Airlines has started retiring aircraft prior to its first Airbus A220 deliveries with the first aircraft to leave the fleet being an Airbus A319-100. The arrival of the first aircraft was confirmed for July 2024, while the second new A220 was expected at the end of the same year. The following six aircraft would be delivered in 2025, then four in 2026, and the last three in 2027. On 30 July 2024, first airplane named Zagreb, landed on Zagreb Airport. Second airplane arrived on 20 December 2024 and it was named Split. Third airplane arrived on 14 May 2025 and it was named Vukovar. Sixth airplane arrived on 30 August 2025, named Zadar. To coincide with the fleet renewal, a new visual identity including a revised logo and livery was unveiled, to be equipped on the new aircraft.

== Corporate affairs ==
=== Ownership ===
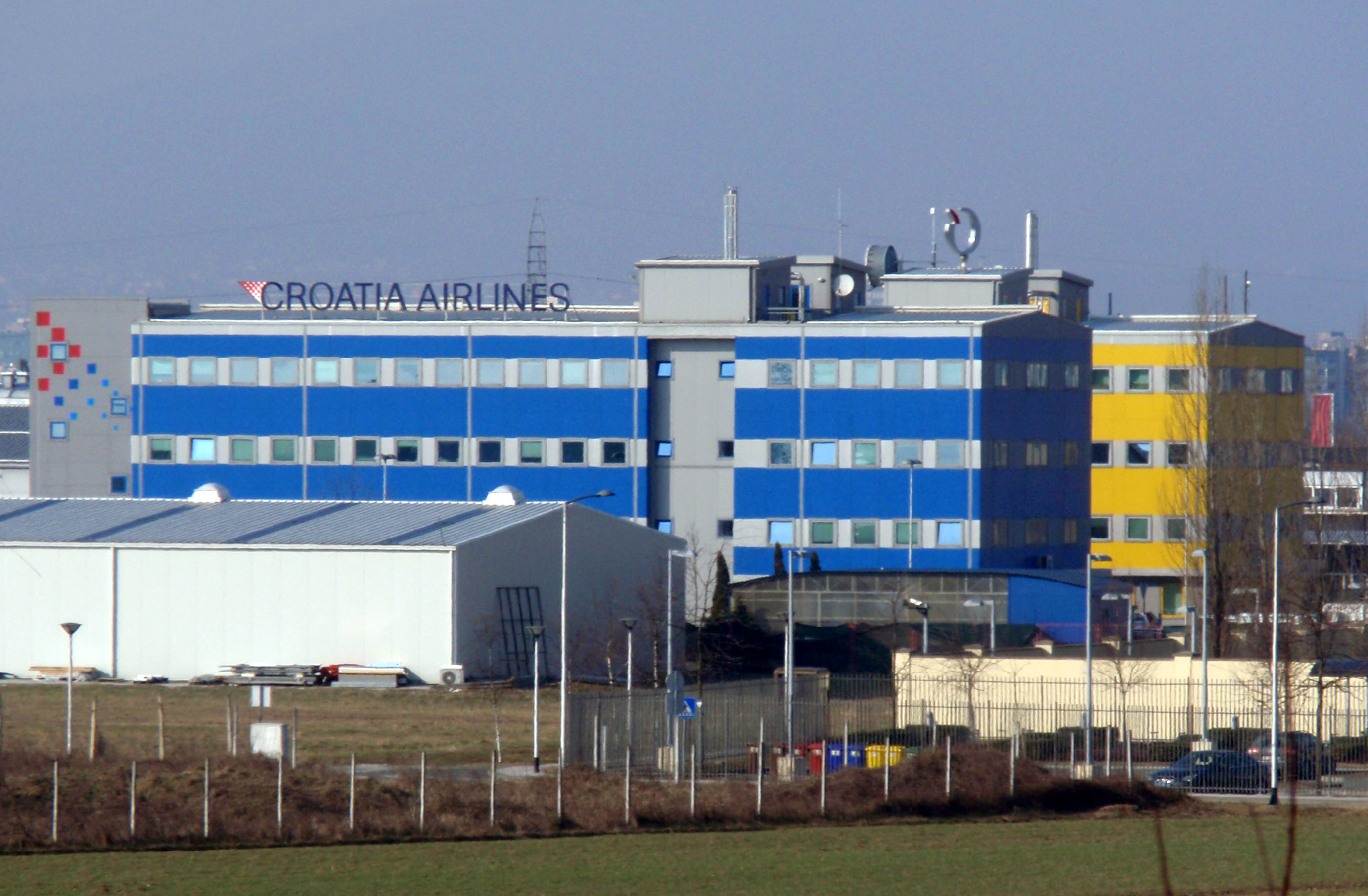
Headquarters in Buzin (Zagreb)

Croatia Airlines is a joint-stock company. Its share capital is divided into 213.266.509 shares (as of 2026):

Share owner	Number of shares	Percentage
Republic of Croatia	212.489.377	99.64%
Zagreb Airport Ltd.	477,121	0.22%
Hrvatska poštanska banka	173,768	0.08%
JANAF d.d.	22,000	0.01%
Others	104,243	0.05%

=== Business trends ===
The key trends for the Croatia Airlines Group over recent years are shown below (as at year ending 31 December):

Year	Turnover (€ m)	Net profit (€ m)	Number of employees (Note: at year end)	Number of passengers (m)	Passenger load factor (%)	Number of aircraft	Sources
2007	204	0.13	1,052	1.7	64.9	10	
2008	229	−11.9	1,113	1.8	65.2	10	
2009	192	−26.3	1,131	1.7	61.4	12	
2010	196	−20.7	1,117	1.6	62.0	13	
2011	234	−15.0	1,101	1.8	67.0	13	
2012	237	−64.7	1,086	1.9	69.1	13	
2013	219	0.19	1,041	1.7	68.8	12	
2014	218	1.1	908	1.8	69.2	12	
2015	214	1.9	898	1.8	69.7	12	
2016	215	1.0	967	1.9	70.7	12	
2017	233	3.5	924	2.1	75.2	12	
2018	236	−10.9	959	2.1	73.5	12	
2019	236	−10.6	999	2.1	73.6	12	
2020	100	−47.5	980	0.61	49.6	12	
2021	112	−38.3	920	0.78	49.9	13	
2022	210	−18.2	909	1.4	62.0	12	
2023	252	2.0	911	1.7	65.3	12	
2024	255	−19.6	943	1.8	65.1	13	
2025	269.4	−38.8	994	2.04	66.3	16	

== Destinations ==
As of April 2026, Croatia Airlines flies to the following destinations:

Country	City	Airport	Notes	Refs
Albania	Tirana	Tirana International Airport Nënë Tereza	Terminated	
Austria	Vienna	Vienna International Airport		
Belgium	Brussels	Brussels Airport		
Bosnia and Herzegovina	Mostar	Mostar International Airport		
Bosnia and Herzegovina	Sarajevo	Sarajevo International Airport		
Croatia	Brač	Brač Airport	Seasonal	
Croatia	Dubrovnik	Dubrovnik Airport	Focus city	
Croatia	Osijek	Osijek Airport		
Croatia	Pula	Pula Airport		
Croatia	Rijeka	Rijeka Airport		
Croatia	Split	Split Airport	Focus city	
Croatia	Zadar	Zadar Airport		
Croatia	Zagreb	Zagreb Airport	Hub	
Czech Republic	Prague	Václav Havel Airport Prague	Seasonal	
Denmark	Copenhagen	Copenhagen Airport		
France	Lyon	Lyon–Saint-Exupéry Airport	Seasonal	
France	Nantes	Nantes Atlantique Airport	Seasonal	
France	Paris	Charles de Gaulle Airport		
Germany	Berlin	Berlin Brandenburg Airport		
Germany	Düsseldorf	Düsseldorf Airport	Seasonal	
Germany	Frankfurt	Frankfurt Airport		
Germany	Munich	Munich Airport		
Germany	Stuttgart	Stuttgart Airport	Seasonal	
Greece	Athens	Athens International Airport	Seasonal	
Ireland	Dublin	Dublin Airport	Seasonal	
Israel	Tel Aviv	Ben Gurion Airport	Seasonal charter	
Italy	Milan	Milan Malpensa Airport	Seasonal	
Italy	Rome	Rome Fiumicino Airport		
Netherlands	Amsterdam	Amsterdam Airport Schiphol		
North Macedonia	Skopje	Skopje International Airport		
Norway	Oslo	Oslo Airport, Gardermoen	Seasonal	
Romania	Bucharest	Henri Coandă International Airport	Terminated	
Spain	Barcelona	Josep Tarradellas Barcelona–El Prat Airport		
Sweden	Stockholm	Stockholm Arlanda Airport	Seasonal	
Switzerland	Zürich	Zürich Airport		
Turkey	Istanbul	Istanbul Airport	Seasonal	
United Kingdom	London	Gatwick Airport	Seasonal	
United Kingdom	London	Heathrow Airport		

=== Codeshare agreements ===
Croatia Airlines has codeshare agreements with the following airlines:

- Air Canada
- Air France
- Air India
- Asiana Airlines
- Austrian Airlines
- Brussels Airlines
- ITA Airways
- KLM Royal Dutch Airlines
- LOT Polish Airlines
- Lufthansa
- Singapore Airlines
- Swiss International Air Lines
- TAP Air Portugal
- Turkish Airlines
- United Airlines

== Fleet ==
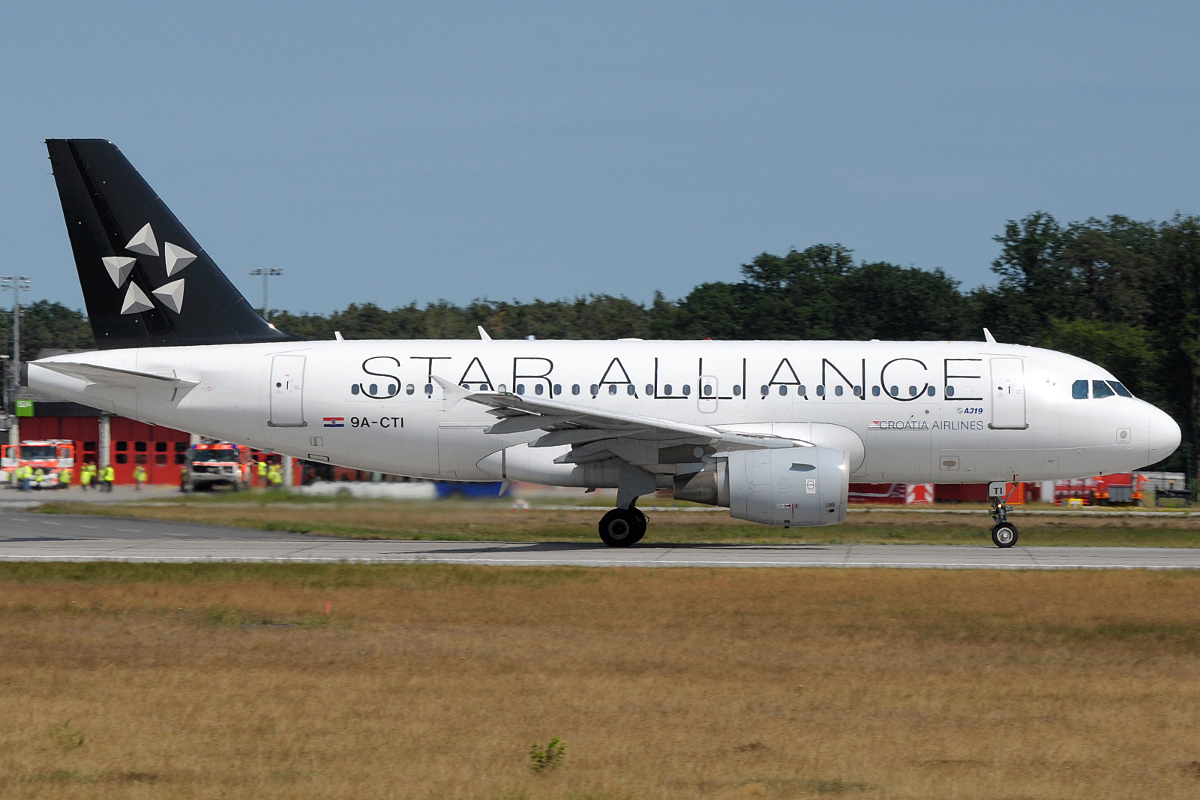
Airbus A319 in Star Alliance livery

=== Current fleet ===
As of October 2026, the Croatia Airlines fleet consists of the following aircraft:

Aircraft	In service	Orders	Passengers	Notes
Airbus A220-100	2	—	127	Deliveries since July 2024.
Airbus A220-300	11	2	149	Deliveries since July 2024.
Airbus A319	1	—	144	To be retired and replaced by Airbus A220 by 2027.
De Havilland Canada Dash 8-Q400	1	—	76	To be retired and replaced by Airbus A220 by 2027.
Total	15	2		

=== Former fleet ===
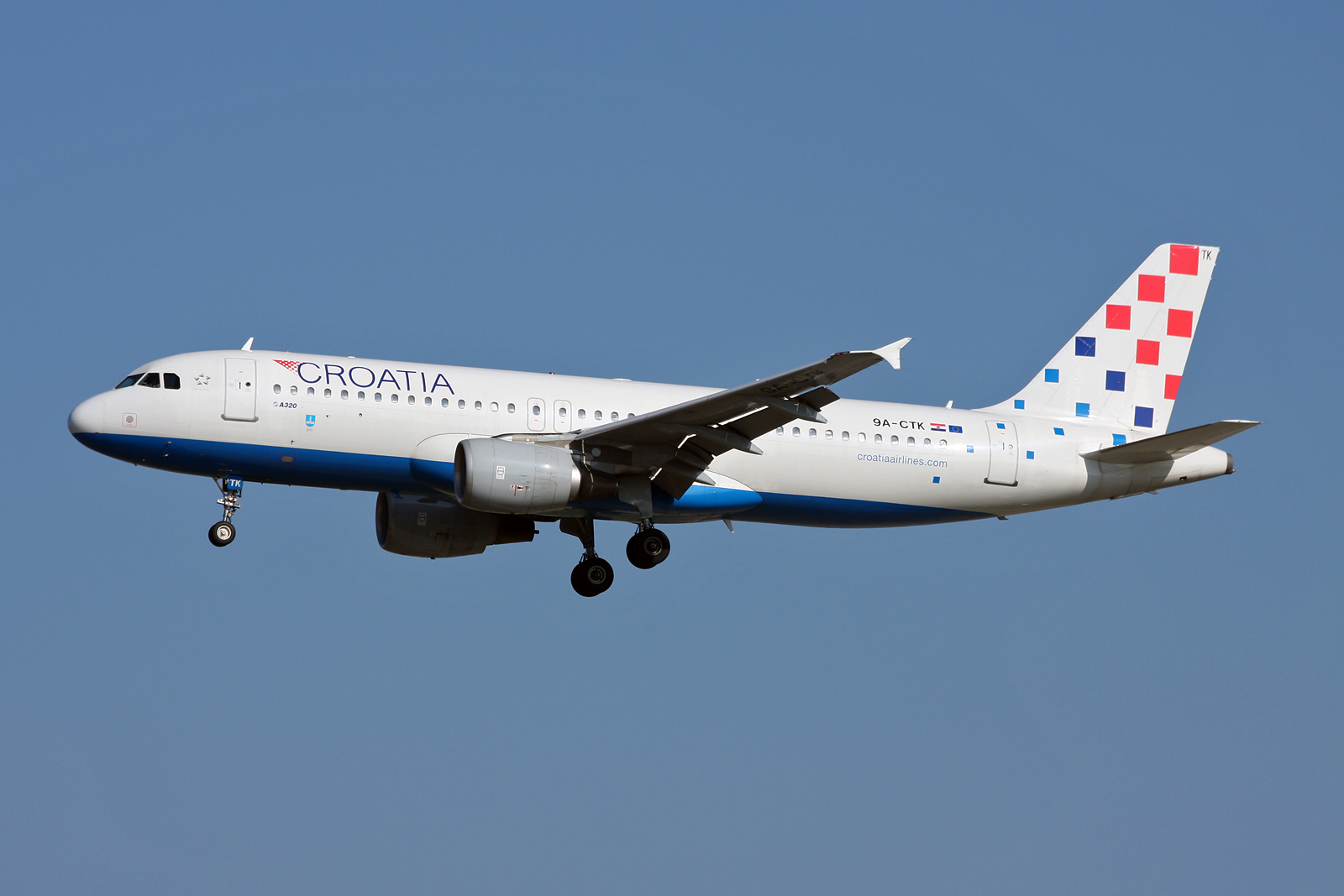
Airbus A320-200 in 2013.

Croatia Airlines formerly operated the following aircraft types:

- Airbus A320-200
- ATR 42
- British Aerospace 146 (leased)
- Boeing 737-200
- Cessna 402 C Type
- McDonnell Douglas MD-82 (leased from Adria Airways)

== Accidents and Incidents ==
- On 16 May 2026, Flight 412, an Airbus A220-300 registered 9A-CAN, suffered a runway excursion while aborting takeoff from Split Airport. During its takeoff roll from runway 23, the aircraft veered to the left and performed a high-speed rejected takeoff at the speed of 131 knots (243 km/h; 151 mph). The aircraft ended up off the runway, on a grassy area alongside it. None of the 132 passengers and five crew members were injured.
