= Split Airport =

Split Saint Jerome Airport Zračna luka Sveti Jeronim Split

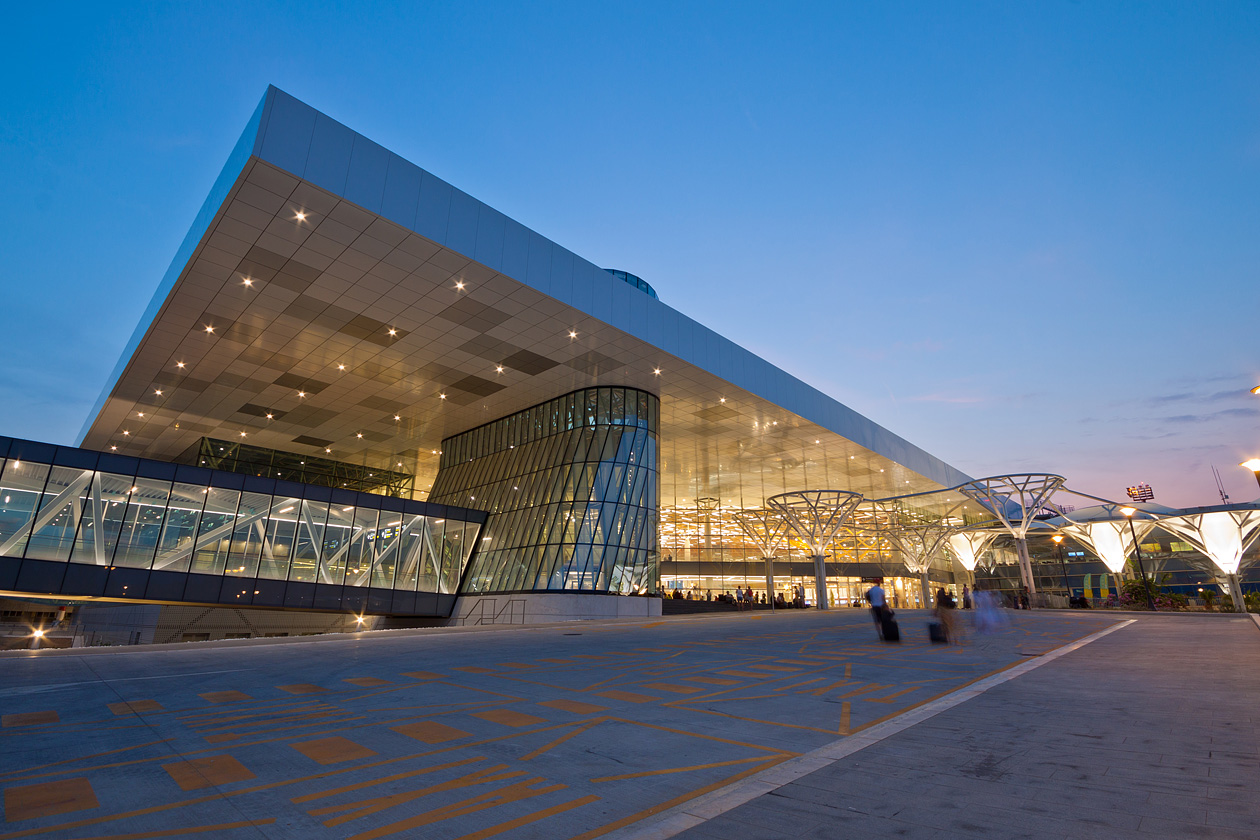
- IATA: SPU; ICAO: LDSP

Summary
- Airport type: Public
- Owner: Split Airport Ltd.
- Serves: Split/Kaštela/Trogir
- Location: Kaštela, Croatia
- Hub for: Croatia Airlines
- Focus city for: easyJet; Volotea; Wizz Air
- Elevation AMSL: 78 ft (24 m)
- Coordinates: 43°32′20″N 016°17′53″E
- Website: www.split-airport.hr/index.php?lang=en

Map
- Location of the airport in Croatia

Runways
Direction	Length		Surface
Direction	m	ft	Surface
05/23	2,550	8,366	Concrete

Statistics (2025)
- Passengers: 3,881,186 ▲7.1%
- Statistics from Split Airport site General information from Split Airport site Source: Croatian Aeronautical Information Publication

Split Saint Jerome Airport (Croatian: Zračna luka Sveti Jeronim Split; IATA: SPU, ICAO: LDSP), also known as Split Airport (Croatian: Zračna luka Split), is an international airport serving the city of Split, Croatia. It is located 19 km (12 mi) from Split, on the west side of Kaštela Bay, in the town of Kaštela, and extending into the adjacent town of Trogir. It is named after Saint Jerome, the patron saint of Split-Dalmatia County.

In 2025, the airport was the second busiest in Croatia after Zagreb Airport, handling 3.9 million passengers. It is a major destination for leisure flights during the European summer holiday season and an important seasonal base for Croatia Airlines that offers flights to European cities such as Athens, Frankfurt, London, Madrid and Paris.

== History ==
=== Foundation and early years ===
The first grass airfield was located in Sinj and the first commercial route was opened in 1931 by the Yugoslav airline Aeroput. It linked Zagreb with Belgrade through Rijeka, Split and Sarajevo, and maintained this route until the start of the Second World War. These flights connected Split either by its Divulje seaplane station, or by the Sinj airfield.

In the sixties, the airport was relocated from Sinj to Resnik. The new airport complex, designed by architect Darko Stipevski ("Tehnika", Zagreb), was opened on 25 November 1966. The apron had dimensions of only 200 m × 112 m (656 ft × 367 ft) and 6 parking positions with a planned capacity of 150,000 passengers. Nearby military underground hangar was built (43.532°N 16.277°E). In 1968, passenger numbers already stood at 150,737 and in 1969 at 235,000. In 1967, the apron was extended for the first time to accommodate 10 aircraft.

A new, larger terminal building designed by architect Branko Gruica ("Projektant", Mostar) was constructed and opened in 1979 to accommodate traffic for the 8th Mediterranean Games held in Split in September of that year. The largest pre-war passenger numbers were achieved in 1987, totalling 1,151,580 passengers and 7,873 landings.

In 1991, the passenger figures dropped to nearly zero, as the Croatian War of Independence and War in Bosnia and Herzegovina broke out. In the years that followed, most of the traffic were NATO and UN cargo planes, such as the C-5 Galaxy, MD-11, Boeing 747 and C-130 Hercules. After 1995, the civilian traffic figures began rising again, and eventually surpassed the 1987 level in 2008.

=== Development since 2000 ===
In 2005, the terminal got a major facelift by architect Ivan Vulić (VV-Projekt, Split) adding one more gate, the glass façade, as well as the award-winning Airport entrance structure consisting of steel/fabric "trees" illuminated by multi-colour LEDs.

The new apron designed by Ivan Vulić, Ivan Radeljak and Mate Žaja was constructed in 2011 with a capacity slightly over the old one but with better security conditions. The cost of this investment was €13 million leading to 34,000 m^{2} (366,000 sq ft) of new parking space for aircraft as well as space for future administrative works below the apron. The lower-level houses warehouses, workshops, offices and other objects that will support the new 34,500 m^{2} (371,000 sq ft), HRK 455 million terminal building that is being built next to it. New apron features an unusual sound barrier on the south side which can be closed when an aircraft is close by and opened in all other times to allow for fairly unobstructed view of the Adriatic sea from the terminal building.

The airport's busiest time are the months of June, July and August due to a large influx of tourists for the European summer holiday period. Weekends are the busiest part of the week with more than 200 flights and some 50,000 passengers.

Due to significant increase in passenger numbers, especially during the summer months, an expansion project was completed in summer of 2019, adding more than three times the floor space of the original terminal building and increasing the capacity to 5 million passengers per year. The original terminal has been refurbished and is still being used for some international departures, while check in, all domestic departures as well as both international and domestic arrivals including baggage claim is located in the new areas. As a part of the expansion project, an enclosed bridge was built over the state road D409, taking passengers to the newly built parking lot, bus terminal and rental car facilities. The decision not to include any jet bridges in the new expansion has been justified because of limited apron space as well as the fact that majority of the airlines at the airport are low-cost carriers.

== Airlines and destinations ==
The following airlines operate regular scheduled and charter flights at Split Airport:

Airlines	Destinations
Aegean Airlines	Seasonal: Athens
Air Baltic	Seasonal: Riga
Air France	Seasonal: Paris–Charles de Gaulle
Air Serbia	Belgrade
Austrian Airlines	Seasonal: Vienna
British Airways	Seasonal: Edinburgh (begins 15 May 2027), London–City, London–Heathrow
Brussels Airlines	Seasonal: Brussels
Condor	Seasonal: Frankfurt
Croatia Airlines	Copenhagen, Frankfurt, Istanbul, London–Heathrow, Munich, Rome–Fiumicino, Zagreb, Zürich; Seasonal: Athens, Berlin, Dublin, Düsseldorf, London–Gatwick, Lyon, Milan–Malpensa, Nantes, Osijek, Oslo, Paris–Charles de Gaulle, Prague, Stockholm–Arlanda, Vienna
Discover Airlines	Frankfurt
EasyJet	Seasonal: Amsterdam, Basel/Mulhouse, Berlin, Bristol, Geneva, Glasgow, Liverpool, London–Gatwick, London–Luton, Lyon, Manchester, Milan–Linate, Naples, Paris–Charles de Gaulle, Paris–Orly, Porto
Edelweiss Air	Zürich
Eurowings	Cologne/Bonn,Düsseldorf, Stuttgart; Seasonal: Berlin, Hamburg
Finnair	Seasonal: Helsinki
Iberia	Seasonal: Madrid
Jet2.com	Seasonal: Birmingham, Edinburgh, Leeds/Bradford, London–Stansted, Manchester
KLM	Amsterdam
LOT Polish Airlines	Seasonal: Warsaw–Chopin
Lufthansa	Seasonal: Munich
Norwegian Air Shuttle	Seasonal: Bergen, Copenhagen, Helsinki, Oslo, Stavanger, Stockholm–Arlanda, Trondheim
Ryanair	Seasonal: Dublin, Rome-Fiumicino
Scandinavian Airlines	Seasonal: Bergen, Copenhagen, Gothenburg, Oslo, Stavanger, Stockholm–Arlanda, Trondheim
SkyUp Airlines	Seasonal: Chișinău (begins 5 June 2027)
Smartwings	Seasonal: Prague
Trade Air	Dubrovnik, Pula, Rijeka
Transavia	Seasonal: Paris–Orly, Rotterdam/The Hague
TUI Airways	Seasonal: London–Gatwick, Manchester
TUI fly Belgium	Seasonal: Brussels
TUI fly Nordic	Stockholm–Arlanda
United Airlines	Seasonal: Newark
Volotea	Seasonal: Athens, Bari, Bordeaux, Lille, Lyon, Marseille, Nantes, Naples, Toulouse
Vueling	Seasonal: Barcelona, Bilbao
Wizz Air	Seasonal: Gdańsk, Katowice, Kraków, London–Luton, Lublin, Warsaw–Chopin, Wrocław

== Statistics ==
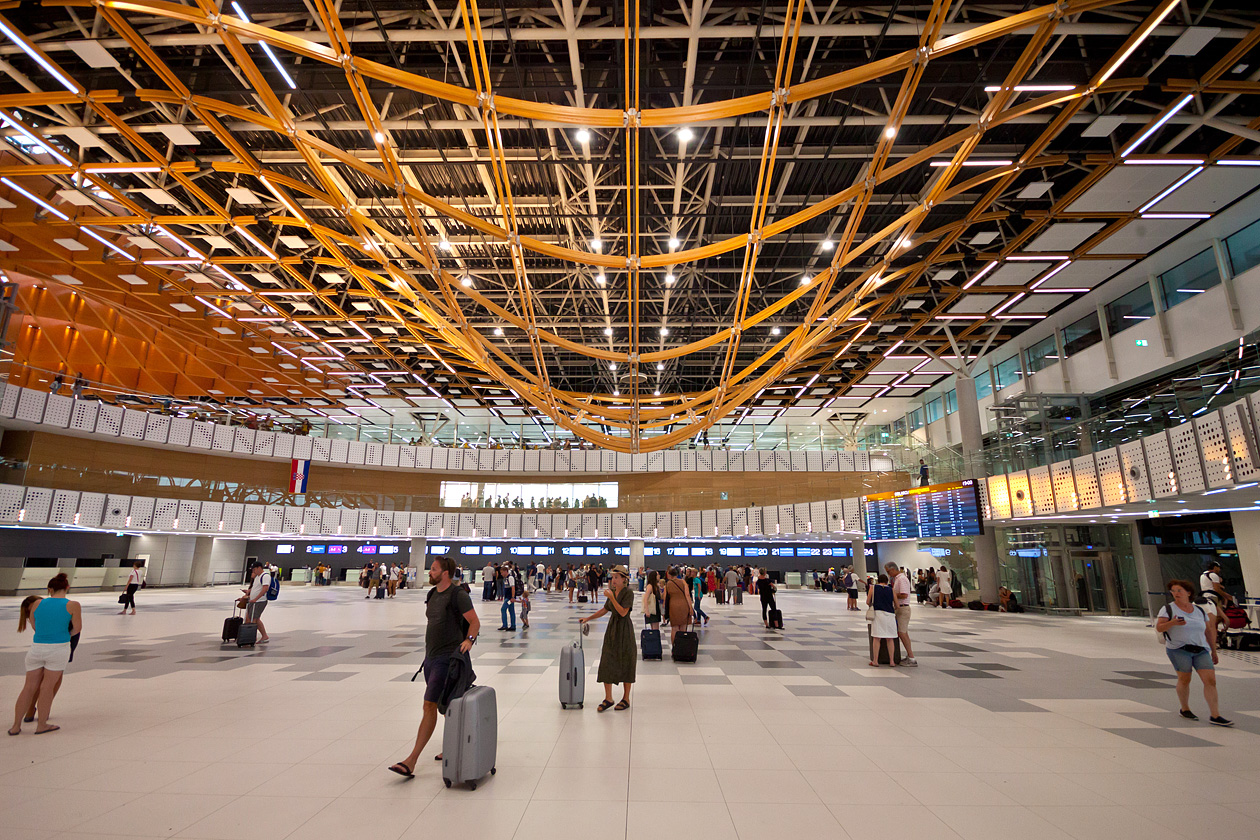
Split Airport new terminal interior

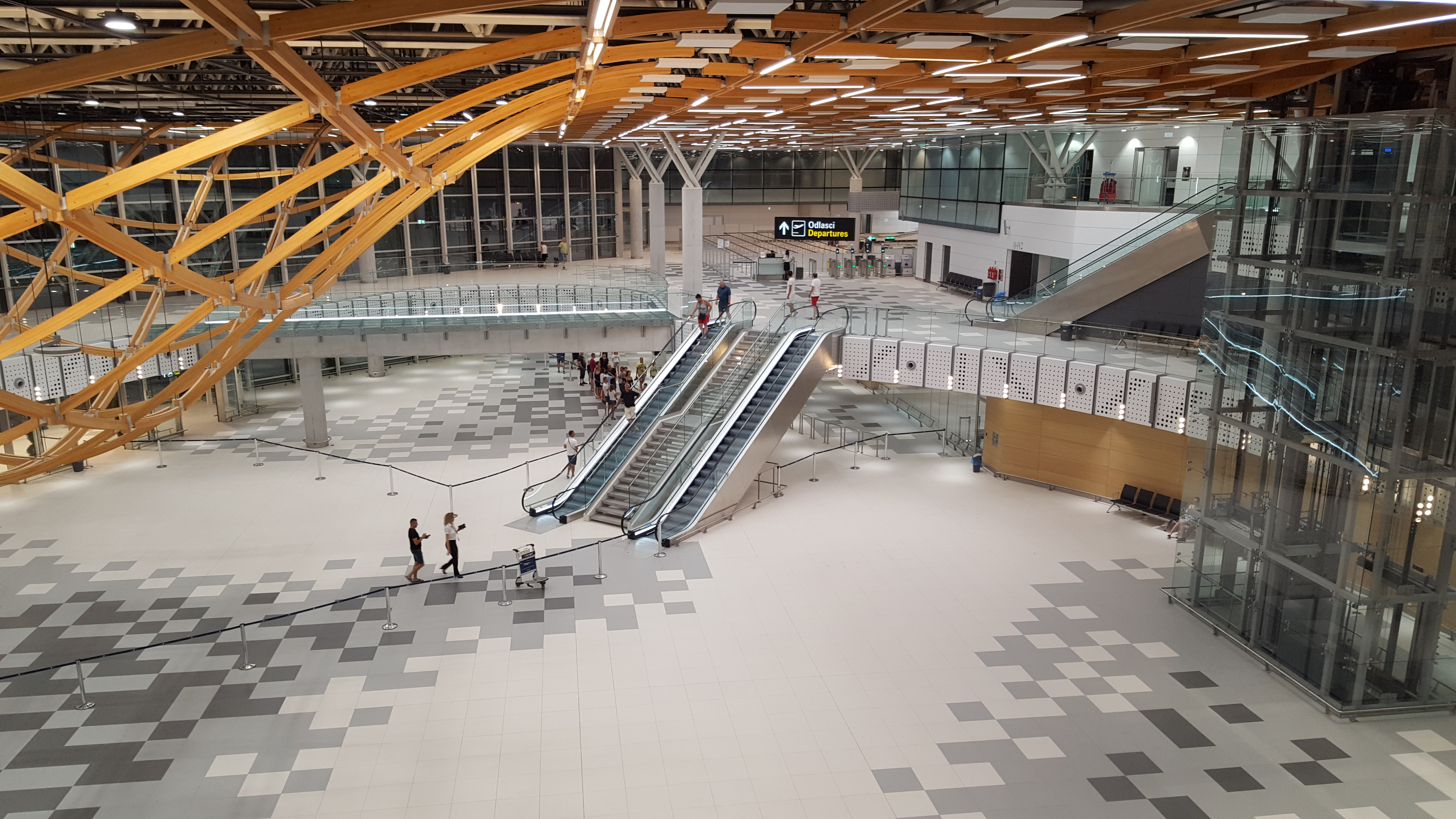
Terminal interior

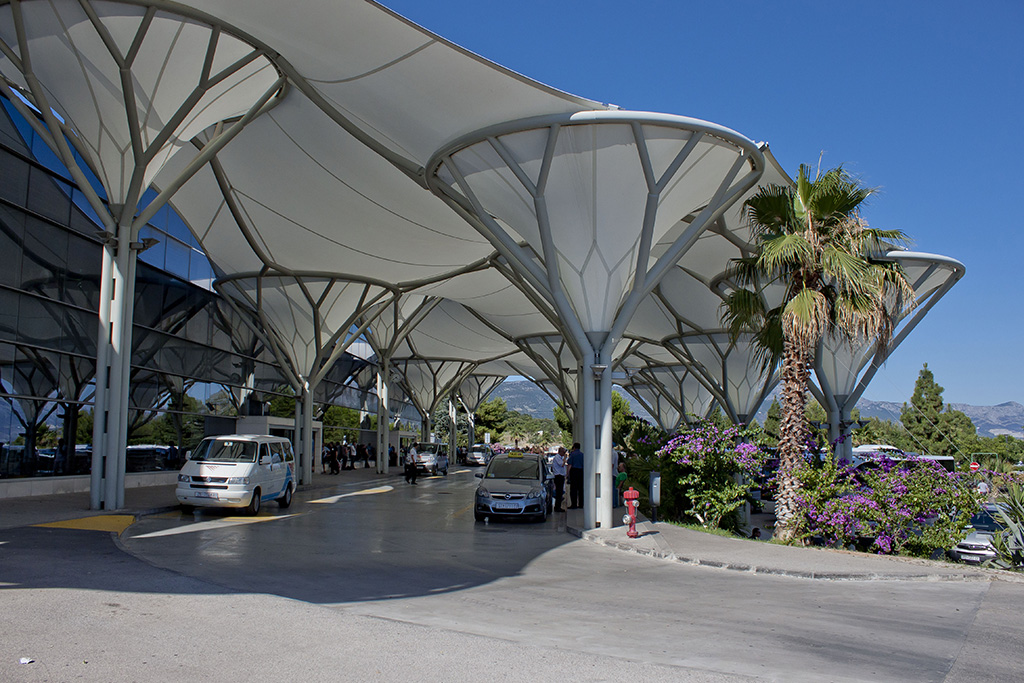
Split Airport old terminal entrance

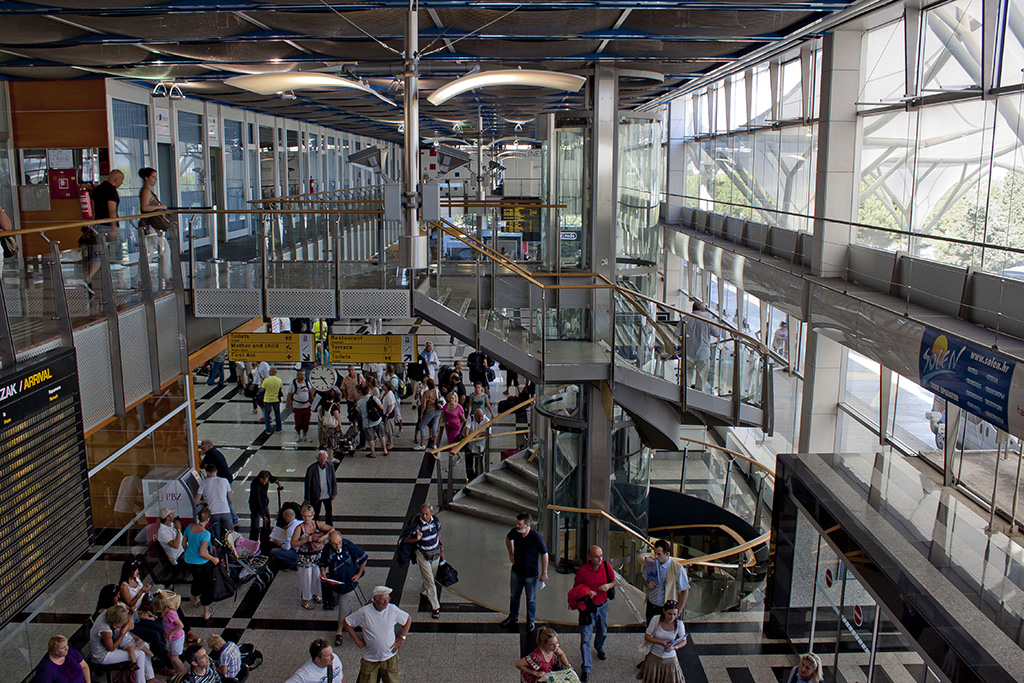
Split Airport old terminal interior

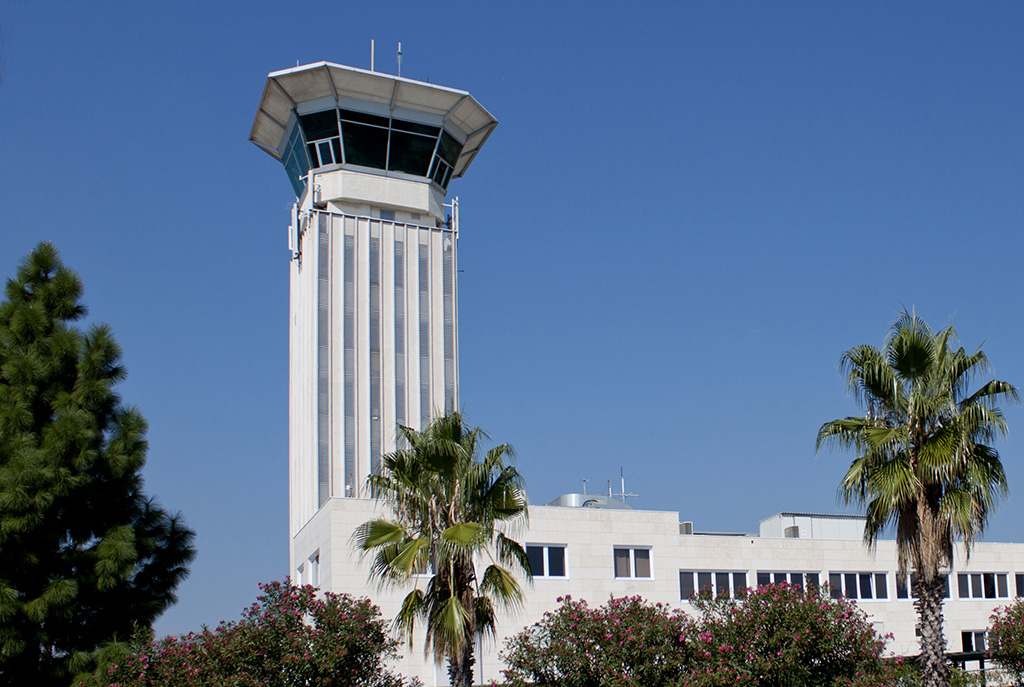
Air Traffic Control tower

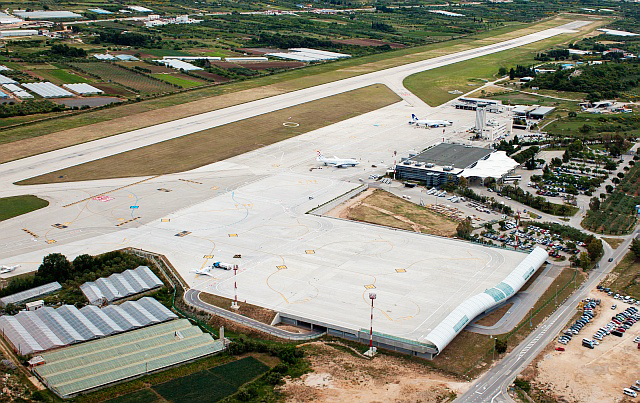
Aerial view of the airport

Traffic at Split Resnik Airport
Year	Passengers	Passenger % Change	Cargo	Cargo % Change
2015	1,955,400	11.57▲	551	10▲
2016	2,289,987	17.11▲	631	15▲
2017	2,818,176	23.1▲	747	18▲
2018	3,124,067	10.85▲	823	10▲
2019	3,301,930	5.69▲	866	5▲
2020	674,366	79.57▼	273	68▼
2021	1,577,584	133.93▲	n/a	n/a
2022	2,908,577	84.37▲	n/a	n/a
2023	3,358,902	15.48▲	n/a	n/a
2024	3,624,150	7.89▲	n/a	n/a
2025	3,881,186	7.1▲	n/a	n/a

=== Passenger numbers ===
2026
Month	Passengers	Passengers cumulatively	Change (%)
January	44,327	44,327	▲24.9%
February	39,188	83,515	▲8.7%
March	66,408	149,923	▲20.9%
April	207,600	357,523	▼2.9%
May	408,767	766,290	▲2.6%
June	562,882	1,329,172	▼3.2%
July	770,152	2,099,324	▼2.1%
August	736,235	2,835,559	▼3.3%
September	540,713	3,376,272	▼3.7%
October	319,485	3,695,757	▼4.4%
November			
December			

== Transport links ==
=== Bus ===
Split Airport can be reached from Split (and Trogir, where indicated) by public buses:

- Promet line no. 37 (Split-Airport-Trogir and Trogir-Airport-Split), terminating at the Sukoišan bus terminal in Split (about 10 minutes walking from the old town, and 20 minutes from the main bus/railway station), departing every 20 minutes on weekdays and every 30 minutes on Saturdays, Sundays and holidays
- Promet line no. 2 (Split-Strinje-Airport)

The airport is also easily reachable by shuttles, taxis or private cars. Numerous car rental companies are available on the site.

=== Ship ===
A catamaran service between the airport and Split harbour is available every 90 minutes in the peak tourist season (15 July – 30 September) and with lower frequency through October. Another line connecting the airport two additional times daily with Split harbour and Bol on Brač island is available from June to mid-September.

=== Rail ===
The airport is linked onto the Split suburban railway with a Promet bus line running eight times daily between the nearest train station (Kaštel Stari) and the airport with a joint ticket.

According to Split city administration plans, starting from 2025 to 2026 the Split suburban railway will be extended to the airport.

== Accidents and incidents ==
- 16 May 2026 – Croatia Airlines Flight 412, an Airbus A220 en route to Frankfurt, veered off the runway during a rejected takeoff at Split Airport. The aircraft veered to the left of the runway, struck runway edge lights and a vertical marker sign, and came to rest in the grass besides the tarmac. All passengers were evacuated with no injuries, and the aircraft received damage to the landing gear and engine cowlings. Split Airport was temporarily closed following the incident, and the Croatian Air, Maritime and Railway Accident Investigation Agency (AIN) launched an inquiry into the incident.
