= Pula Airport =

Airport serving Pula, Croatia

Pula Airport Zračna luka Pula

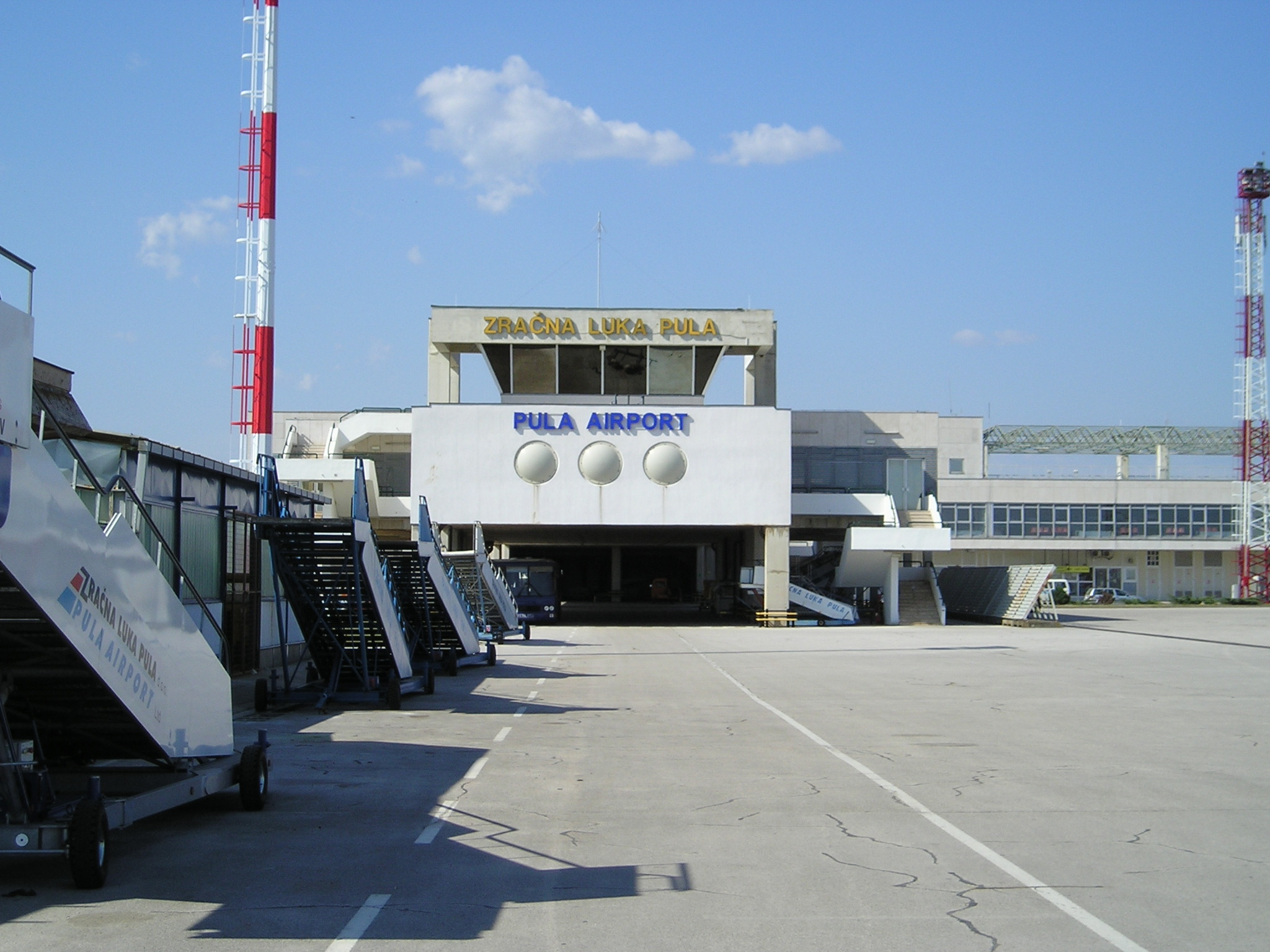
- IATA: PUY; ICAO: LDPL

Summary
- Airport type: Public
- Operator: Pula Airport Ltd.
- Serves: Pula, Croatia
- Elevation AMSL: 274 ft (84 m)
- Coordinates: 44°53′37″N 013°55′20″E
- Website: airport-pula.hr

Map
- Location of the airport in Croatia

Runways
Direction	Length		Surface
Direction	m	ft	Surface
09/27	2,950	9,678	Asphalt

Statistics (2024)
- Passengers: 509,397 ▲19,95%
- Source: Croatian Aeronautical Information Publication

Pula Airport (Croatian: Zračna luka Pula; Italian: Aeroporto di Pola; IATA: PUY, ICAO: LDPL) is the international airport serving the city of Pula, in northwestern Croatia, and is located 6 km from the city centre. It served 777,568 passengers in 2019. The airport is designated as the alternative airport for parts of Slovenia. It serves as a major access point to the city of Pula-Pola, as well as most of Istria, most notably Brijuni-Brioni national park. It is the fifth busiest airport in Croatia.

== History ==
Pula Airport at its current location was initially used only for military purposes but it was changed to a civilian airport as of 1 May 1967 and saw 701,370 passengers in 1987. In the same year, works on a new terminal building began and were completed by 1989 with a capacity of 1 million passengers per year. The Croatian War of Independence caused a sharp decline in passenger numbers.

The airport saw a steady increase in passenger volume over the next 3 decades. As most passengers flying to or from Pula airport are holiday makers, flight numbers have a significant seasonal character.

== Facilities ==
Pula Airport has a single terminal building with a capacity of 1 million passengers per year. The airport serves both domestic and international flights. Inside the terminal there are a couple of café/snack bars as well as duty-free shop. None of the gates are equipped with jet bridges but rather the passengers walk from the terminal building to the aircraft or are transferred by bus. Because of its location and fairly good weather conditions all year around, as well as lower flight numbers during the winter months, it is frequently used by European carriers for training flights.

== Airlines and destinations ==
The following airlines operate regular scheduled and charter flights at Pula Airport:

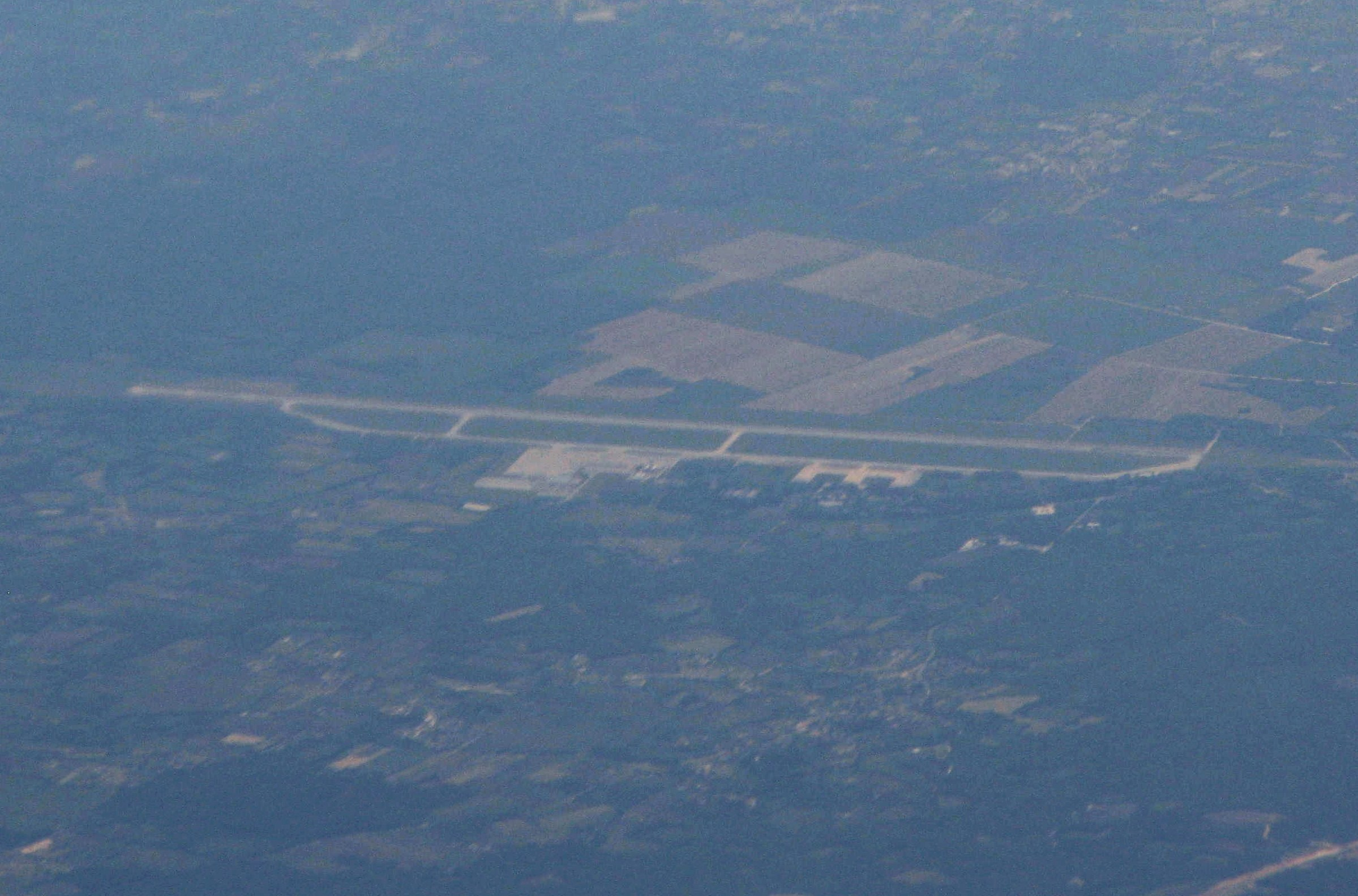
Aerial view

Airlines	Destinations
Air Dolomiti	Seasonal: Munich
Air Serbia	Seasonal: Belgrade
Croatia Airlines	Zadar, Zagreb
EasyJet	Seasonal: Amsterdam, Basel/Mulhouse, Berlin, Bristol, Glasgow, London–Gatwick, London–Luton
Edelweiss Air	Seasonal: Zürich
Eurowings	Seasonal: Cologne/Bonn, Düsseldorf, Hanover, Stuttgart
Jet2.com	Seasonal: Birmingham, East Midlands, Edinburgh (begins 2 May 2027), London–Gatwick, London–Stansted, Manchester
Lufthansa	Seasonal: Frankfurt, Munich
Norwegian Air Shuttle	Seasonal: Copenhagen, Oslo, Stockholm–Arlanda
Ryanair	Seasonal: Brussels-Charleroi, Gothenburg, Katowice, London–Stansted, Memmingen, Poznań, Vienna, Weeze
Scandinavian Airlines	Seasonal: Copenhagen, Oslo, Stockholm-Arlanda
SkyUp Airlines	Seasonal: Chișinău (begins 13 June 2027)
Trade Air	Osijek, Split
Transavia	Seasonal: Amsterdam (begins 2 June 2027), Rotterdam/The Hague
TUI Airways	Seasonal: Birmingham, London–Gatwick, Manchester
TUI fly Nordic	Seasonal charter: Gothenburg, Stockholm–Arlanda

== Climate ==
Since records began in 1978, the highest temperature recorded at the airport's weather station at an elevation of 83 metres (272 ft) was 38.2 °C (100.8 °F), on 5 August 2017. The coldest temperature was −10.3 °C (13.5 °F), on 8 January 1985.

== Ground transportation ==
The airport can be reached by a dedicated bus line from the centre of Pula which goes to/from the airport ("Zračna luka Pula") and the Pula central bus terminal ("Bus Kolodvor"). The schedule is adjusted on a monthly basis to meet the flights arrival/departure.

== Incidents and accidents ==
- On 2 August 2009, a private Piper PA-46-310P Malibu, from Frankfurt to Pula failed to extend its nose gear for landing. After several tries it ran out of fuel and landed on its main landing gear. When it landed, the nose of the airplane touched the runway and stopped, which resulted in substantial damage. There were no injuries reported among the five passengers.
- On 31 March 2023, a German-registered Flight Design CTSW crashed during takeoff killing both occupants.
