= Brač Airport =

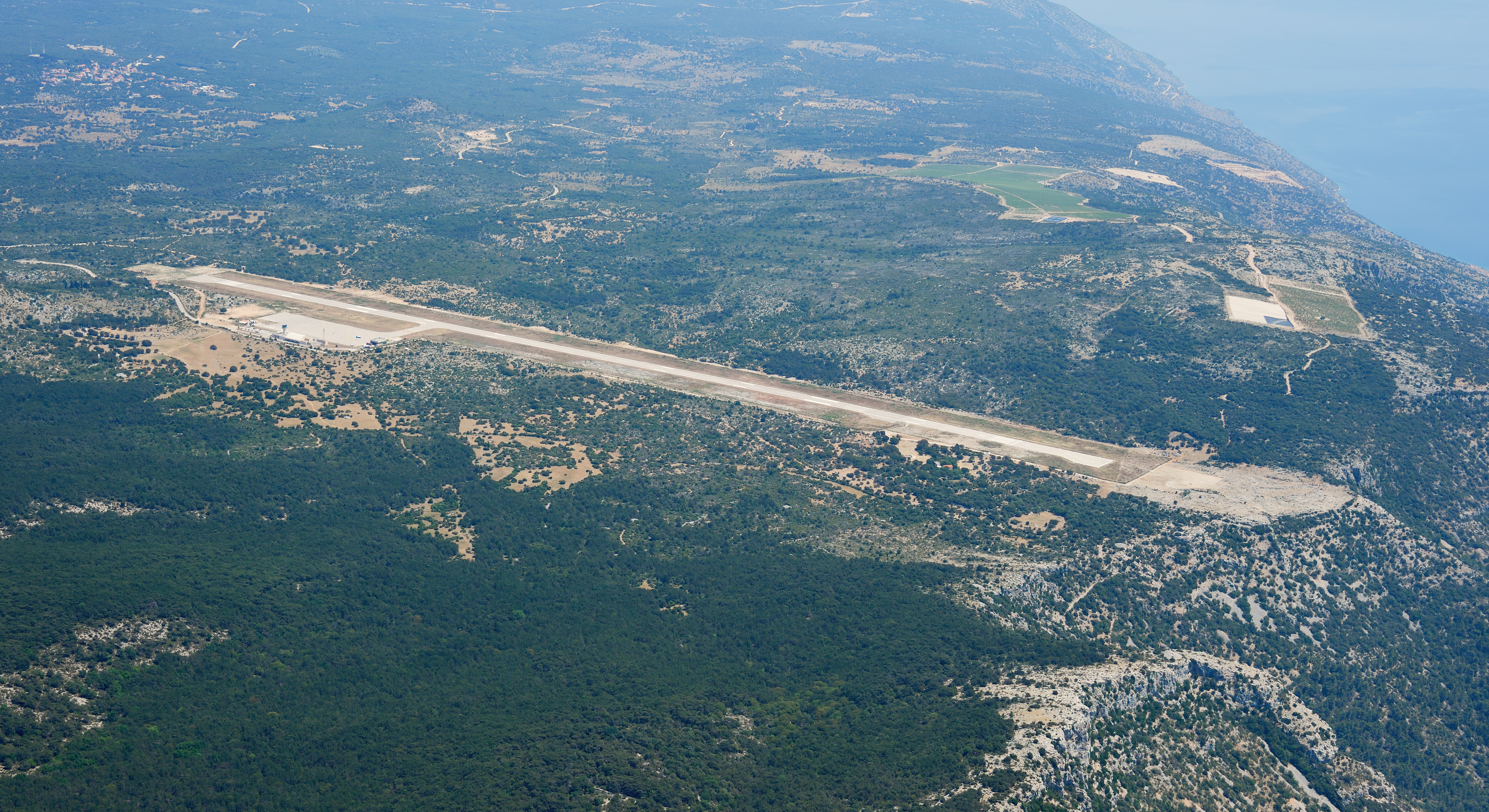
- IATA: BWK; ICAO: LDSB

Summary
- Airport type: Public
- Operator: Brač Airport Ltd.
- Serves: Brač, Croatia
- Location: Bol
- Elevation AMSL: 1,781 ft / 543 m
- Coordinates: 43°17′09″N 016°40′47″E
- Website: airport-brac.hr

Map
- Location of the airport in Croatia

Runways
| Direction | Length | | Surface |
| Direction | m | ft | Surface |
|---|---|---|---|
| 04/22 | 1,760 | 5,774 | Asphalt |

Statistics (2023)
- Passengers: 19,073 ▲19.60%
- Croatian Aeronautical Information Publication

Brač Airport (Croatian: Zračna luka Brač; IATA: BWK, ICAO: LDSB) is an airport on the Croatian island of Brač, close to the town of Bol, after which it is sometimes also named informally. It is one of three island airports in the country (the other two being Krk Island's Rijeka Airport and Lošinj Airport on the eponymous island) used for commercial passenger flights, mainly charter traffic from Europe during the summer season.

== Overview ==
Brač Airport is situated in Veško field, 543m above sea level. It is located some 14 km from Zlatni Rat (Golden horn) and 30 km from Supetar, the largest town on the island. Due to the airport's elevation as well as the vicinity of the highest island's peak, Vidova gora, there is a possibility of fog, low stratus and poor visibility. There is also a possibility of snow, but only for a few days during winter. The most frequent winds are bora (NE) and jugo (SE) and temporary light winds, such as maestral (W) and burin (NE).

Brač Airport is equipped for acceptance and dispatching of a smaller commercial aircraft up to 100 seats during daylight and at night. It is open all year long. Charters and scheduled flights typically operate only during the summer season. Public transportation is not organised, however, a taxi service is available during airport opening hours.

Brač Airport was opened on 22 May 1993, making it Croatia's youngest airport. The present terminal building opened in 2007.

Between November 2016 and March 2017 the runway was lengthened from 1,440 to 1,760 meters towards the southwest, allowing the airport to handle aircraft such as Airbus A319, Bombardier C-Series and Embraer 195. Work was valued at 666,000 euros.

The second phase of runway extension will see the runway lengthened towards the northeast from 1,760 to 2,350 meters, enabling unrestricted aircraft handling of Airbus A320 and Boeing 737-800.

== Airlines and destinations ==
The following airlines operate regular scheduled and charter flights at Brač Airport:

| Airlines | Destinations |
|---|---|
| Air Serbia | Seasonal: Belgrade |
| Croatia Airlines | Seasonal: Zagreb |
| Luxair | Seasonal: Luxembourg |
| Sky Alps | Seasonal: Bolzano, Bratislava |

== Statistics ==
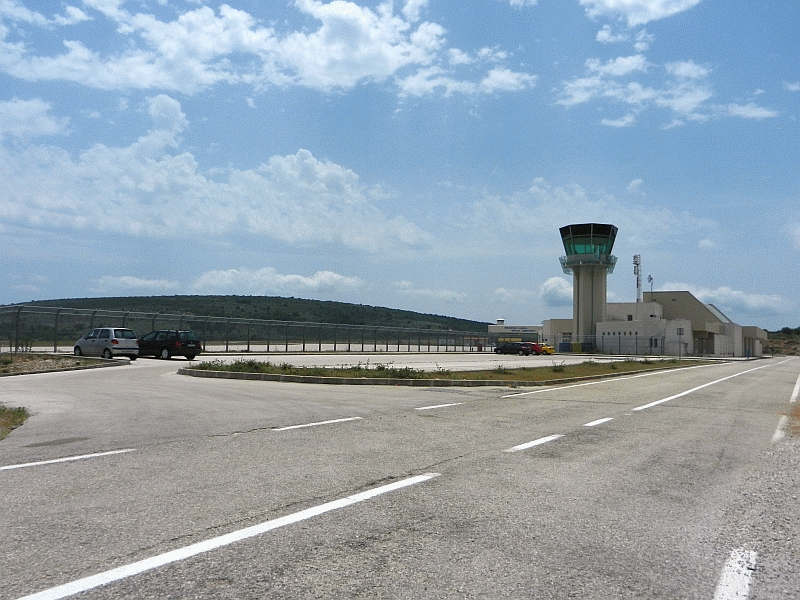
Control tower

Traffic at Brač Airport
| Year | Passengers | A/C Operations |
|---|---|---|
| 2000 | 29.036 | 1.448 |
| 2001 | 33.759▲ | 1.587▲ |
| 2002 | 31.966▼ | 1.815▲ |
| 2003 | 27.339▼ | 2.058▲ |
| 2004 | 26.965▼ | 1.875▼ |
| 2005 | 22.205▼ | 1.865▼ |
| 2006 | 17.721▼ | 2.266▲ |
| 2007 | 15.520▼ | 2.172▼ |
| 2008 | 14.784▼ | 1.862▼ |
| 2009 | 12.860▼ | 2.122▲ |
| 2010 | 11.747▼ | 1.390▼ |
| 2011 | 12.582▲ | 1.538▲ |
| 2012 | 12.634▲ | 1.426▼ |
| 2013 | 10.396▼ | 1.310▼ |
| 2014 | 10.431▲ | 1.382▲ |
| 2015 | 9.813▼ | 1.622▲ |
| 2016 | 13.119▲ | 2.010▲ |
| 2017 | 21.596▲ | TBC |
| 2018 | 30.170▲ | TBC |
| 2019 | 25.339▼ | TBC |
| 2020 | 4.250▼ | TBC |
| 2021 | 10.004▲ | TBC |
| 2022 | 15.948▲ | TBC |
| 2023 | 19.073▲ | TBC |
