= Zagreb Airport =

Main international airport serving Zagreb, Croatia

Zagreb Franjo Tuđman Airport Zračna luka Franjo Tuđman Zagreb

- IATA: ZAG; ICAO: LDZA

Summary
- Airport type: Public/military
- Owner: Groupe ADP
- Operator: MZLZ d.d.
- Serves: Zagreb
- Location: Velika Gorica, Croatia
- Hub for: Croatia Airlines
- Focus city for: Ryanair
- Elevation AMSL: 353 ft (108 m)
- Coordinates: 45°44′35″N 016°04′08″E
- Website: www.zagreb-airport.hr

Maps
- Airport diagram

- Location in Croatia
- Interactive map of Zagreb Franjo Tuđman Airport

Runways
Direction	Length		Surface
Direction	m	ft	Surface
04/22	3,252	10,669	Asphalt/ Concrete

Statistics (2025)
- Number of passengers: 4,721,563 ▲9.38%
- Aircraft movements: 51,664 ▲3.42%
- Cargo (Metric tonnes): 12,408 ▼4.74%
- Source: Zagreb Airport

Zagreb Franjo Tuđman Airport (Croatian: Zračna luka Franjo Tuđman Zagreb) or Zagreb Airport (Croatian: Zračna luka Zagreb) (IATA: ZAG, ICAO: LDZA) is an international airport serving Zagreb and its surrounding area, in Zagreb County, Croatia. It is the busiest airport in Croatia, handling 4.72 million passengers and 12,408 tons of cargo in 2025.

Named after Franjo Tuđman, the first president of Croatia, the airport is located some 10 km (6.2 mi) southeast of Zagreb Central Station in Velika Gorica. It is the hub of the Croatian flag carrier Croatia Airlines and a focus city for Trade Air. The main base of the Croatian Air Force is also located on the airport's premises, as is the Croatian Air Traffic Control's administration.

The airport has undergone several phases of development since the early history of aviation in Zagreb. The city's first airfield was established at Črnomerec in 1909, followed by Borongaj Airport in 1928 and Lučko Airport after the Second World War. In 1962, commercial operations were transferred to the new airport at Pleso, southeast of Zagreb. A new passenger terminal, opened in 2017, replaced the original terminal and includes modern check-in facilities, security and border control, baggage handling systems, retail and dining outlets, airline lounges, and other passenger amenities.

== History ==
=== Črnomerec Airport ===
The history of Zagreb civil aviation began in 1909, when the city of Zagreb—then part of Austria-Hungary, specifically the Kingdom of Croatia-Slavonia—established its first airfield near the western neighbourhood of Črnomerec. Although several European airlines later connected the city, it was primarily Aeroput that linked Zagreb with major destinations across Europe, significantly increasing air traffic in the period preceding the Second World War.

The famous Croatian inventor, engineer Eduard Slavoljub Penkala built a hangar next to the grassy runway where he constructed the first aircraft in Croatia. On June 23, 1910, his mechanic Dragutin Novak took off with Penkala's aircraft and went down in history as the first Croatian pilot. Later, during one of Novak's flights October 20 1910, the aircraft was damaged and Penkala gave up further research.

=== Borongaj Airport ===
The first airport with all the necessary facilities for landing and take-off was built at Borongaj, near the marshalling yard of the same name, then 6 km (3.7 miles) from the city itself. The airport was built in 1926 and on February 15, 1928 the first air route between Zagreb and Belgrade was opened. That year, 1,322 passengers and 10 tons of cargo were transported. In the following years, domestic routes were opened connecting Zagreb with Dubrovnik, Ljubljana, Split and Sarajevo, as well as other international routes with Graz, Klagenfurt, Vienna, Prague, Budapest, Trieste and Milan.

In 1937, Charles Lindbergh landed on Borongaj Airport. During the NDH, it served as a Nazi air base, and the only female Luftwaffe pilot, Hanna Reitsch, landed there. The airport also housed a swimming pool for military pilots. Later, the Allies bombed it several times and severely damaged it. Borongaj Airport was used for both civil air traffic and military purposes. At the beginning of the World War II, civil air traffic ceased and the airport was used exclusively for military purposes.

=== Lučko Airport ===
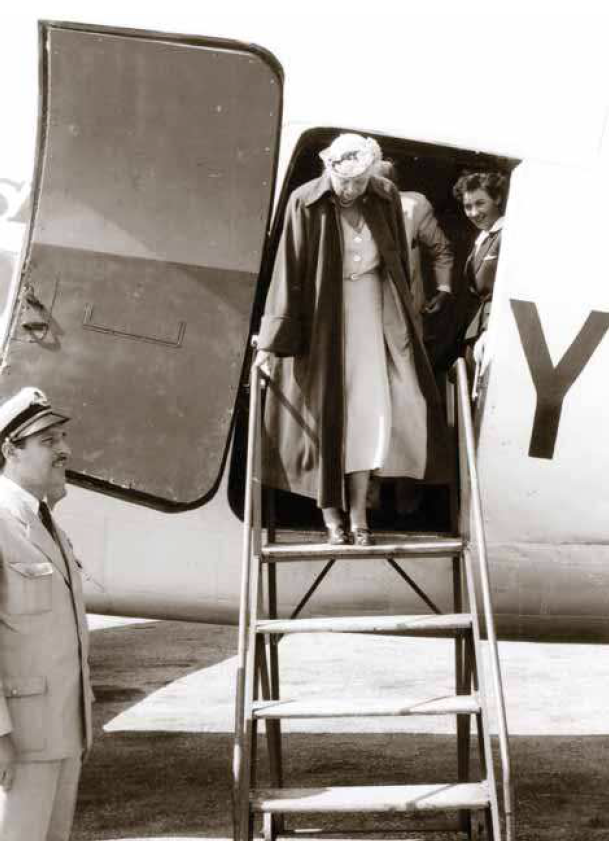
Eleanor Roosevelt in Lučko Airport, 1953

A third airport was built 11 km (6.8 miles) from Zagreb, in the settlement of Lučko, but it could not meet the needs of the increasingly developed Croatian aviation. The World Parachute Championship was held there in 1978, and the World Precision Flying Championship in 2002. Although it is still called Lučko, according to the new administrative division, the airport is now located in the suburban settlement of Ježdovec.

After the Second World War, air traffic was gradually restored, and Lučko Airport was used, which had a grass runway and a concrete platform for parking aircraft. At that time, aircraft weighing up to 15 tons landed at Lučko. Due to the grass runway and poor navigation equipment, Lučko Airport could not keep up with the rapid development of aviation. At the request of the then "Civil Aviation Administration", a new location was found between the City of Zagreb and Velika Gorica - Pleso.

Aerodrom Lučko is a centre for general aviation training in Croatia. Several flight schools at the airport provide instruction for pilot licences, including the Light Aircraft Pilot Licence (LAPL), Private Pilot Licence (PPL), Commercial Pilot Licence (CPL), and Airline Transport Pilot Licence (ATPL). The airport also hosts parachuting schools, aeromodelling activities, and aviation workshops and seminars focused on flight operations and aviation safety.

=== Pleso-Zagreb Airport ===
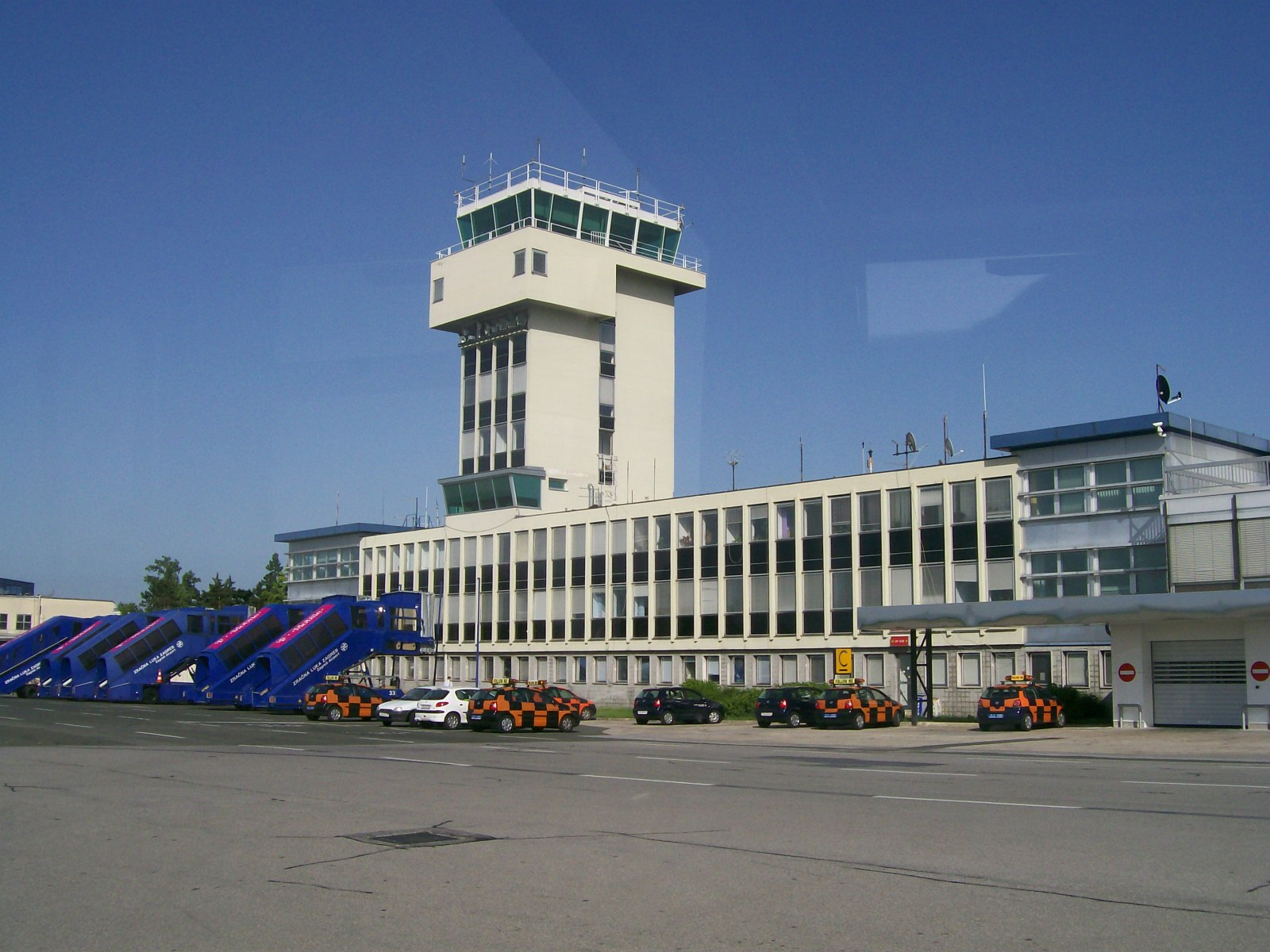
Old terminal, 2008

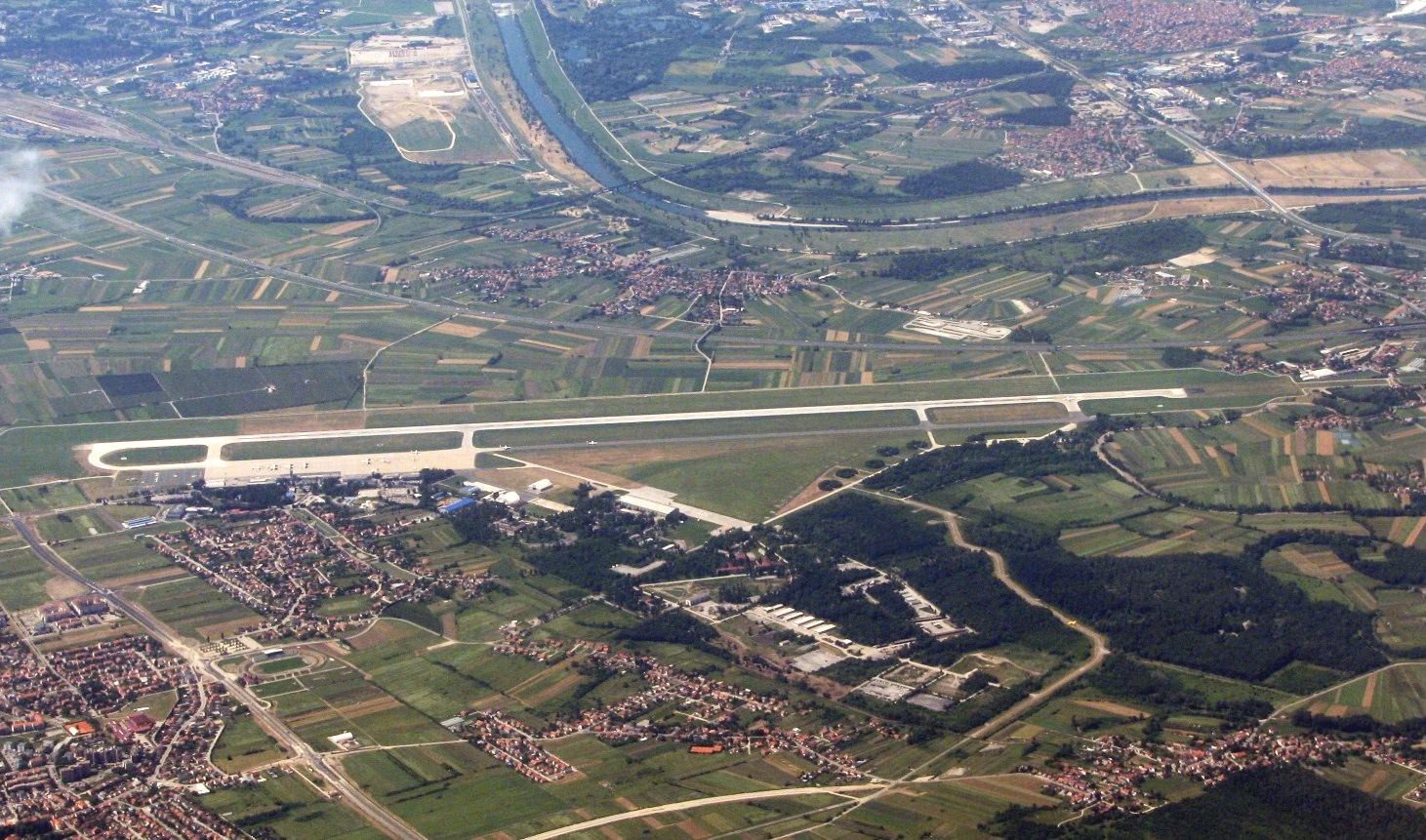
Aerial view, 2010

In 1959, a passenger terminal and apron were constructed at Pleso, and the airport was opened to civil air traffic later that year. Following the transfer of commercial operations, Lučko Airport was retained for sports aviation. The airport operating company, Zagreb Airport (Zračna luka Zagreb), was registered on 6 November 1961 and began operations on 20 April 1962. At the time, the airport featured a 2,500 m concrete runway, a passenger terminal with a floor area of 1,000 m^{2}, and an apron capable of accommodating five smaller aircraft. During its first year of operation, the airport handled 78,041 passengers, 633 tonnes of cargo, and 5,206 aircraft movements. In 1966, a new passenger terminal with a floor area of 5,000 m^{2} was completed. The runway was resurfaced and extended to 2,860 m, the apron was expanded to 60,000 m^{2}, and a new administrative building with an air traffic control tower was constructed. That year, the airport was officially renamed Zagreb Airport.

A further major expansion took place in 1974, during which the airport was closed for two months. The runway was reconstructed and extended to 3,259 m, radio navigation systems were upgraded, and operational equipment was modernized. By the 1980s, Zagreb Airport had become the second-busiest airport in Yugoslavia in terms of both passenger traffic and aircraft movements. The national carrier JAT operated a hub at the airport, serving numerous domestic and international destinations, including nonstop flights to New York City using McDonnell Douglas DC-10 aircraft.

In response to continued growth in air traffic, another phase of expansion began in 1984. New facilities included a customs office, an international freight forwarding and cargo terminal, and a fire station. The passenger terminal was enlarged to a total floor area of 11,000 m^{2}. In 1986, the apron was expanded by a further 30,000 m^{2}, and the taxiway system was upgraded.

Following Croatia's declaration of independence in 1991, the airport retained the official name Zagreb Airport. During the subsequent years, a series of renovations and upgrades were carried out to the passenger terminal, runway, and taxiways. Facilities for the national carrier Croatia Airlines were also established on the airport grounds.

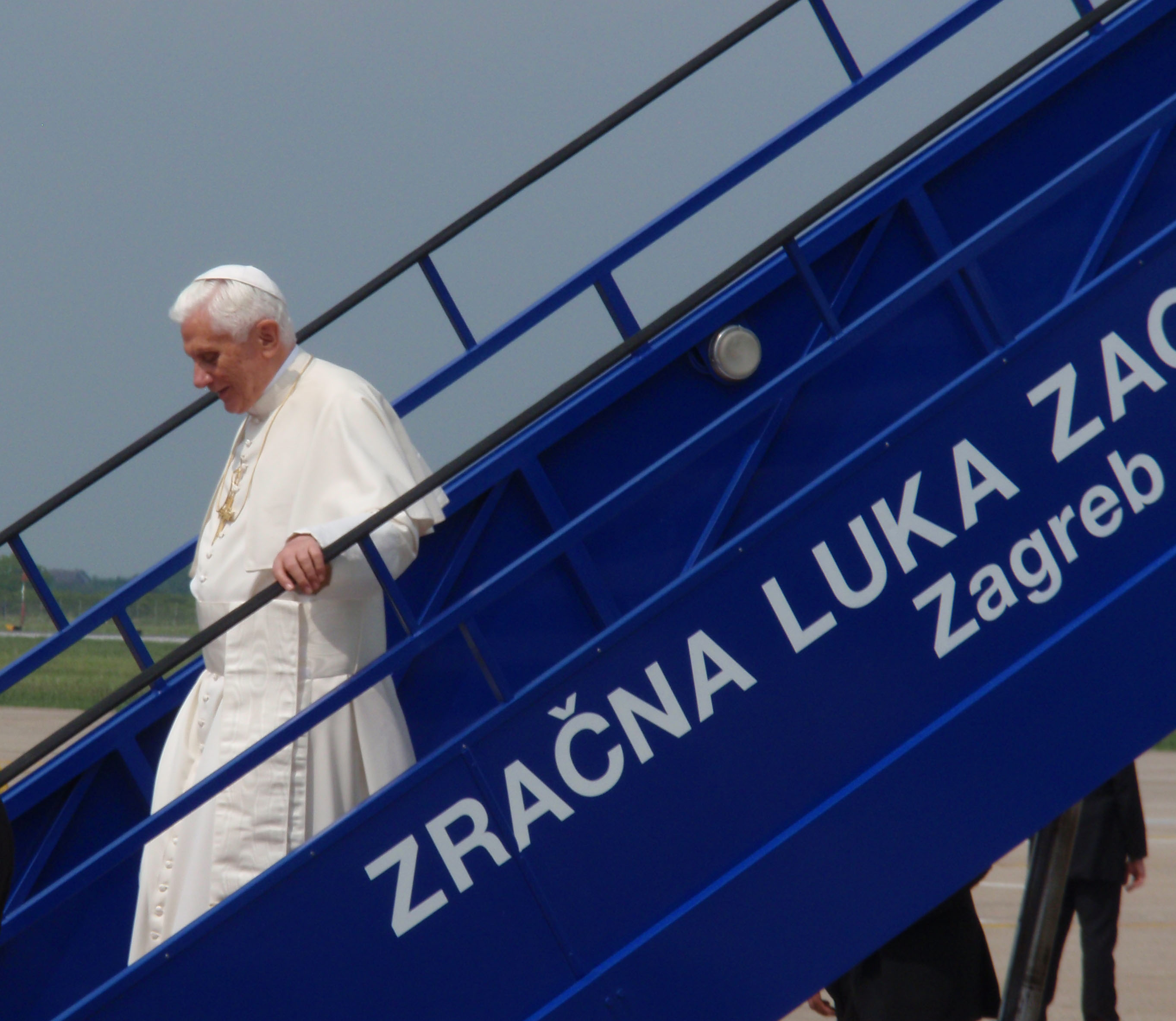
Pope Benedict XVI arriving at Zagreb Airport, June 2011

During the Croatian War of Independence, the airport was the site of several military incidents. On 31 August 1991, a Boeing 707 chartered by Anton Kikaš and carrying arms intended for Croatian forces was intercepted by Yugoslav People's Army (JNA) fighter aircraft and forced to land at Zagreb Airport. Croatian forces attempted to secure the aircraft by attacking the control tower and blocking access roads, but the JNA retained control of the airport, seized the aircraft, and flew it out. During the conflict, the airport also served as a logistics hub for United Nations humanitarian operations, facilitating the delivery of food and medical supplies to Croatia and Bosnia and Herzegovina. The British 24th Field Ambulance was stationed in a former JNA camp at the airport.

On 2 and 3 May 1995, during the Zagreb rocket attacks, the airport was among the sites struck by rockets fired by forces of the self-proclaimed Republic of Serbian Krajina under the command of Milan Martić.

=== Colonel Marko Živković Barracks ===
Within the "Franjo Tuđman" Airport, on its eastern part, there is the "Pukovnik Marko Živković" barracks, which is also the headquarters of the Croatian Air Force and Air Defense. The barracks is also home to the 91st Zagreb Air Base, which, in addition to transport aircraft and helicopters, also has a squadron of MiG-21 bisD fighters.

== Development since 2000 ==
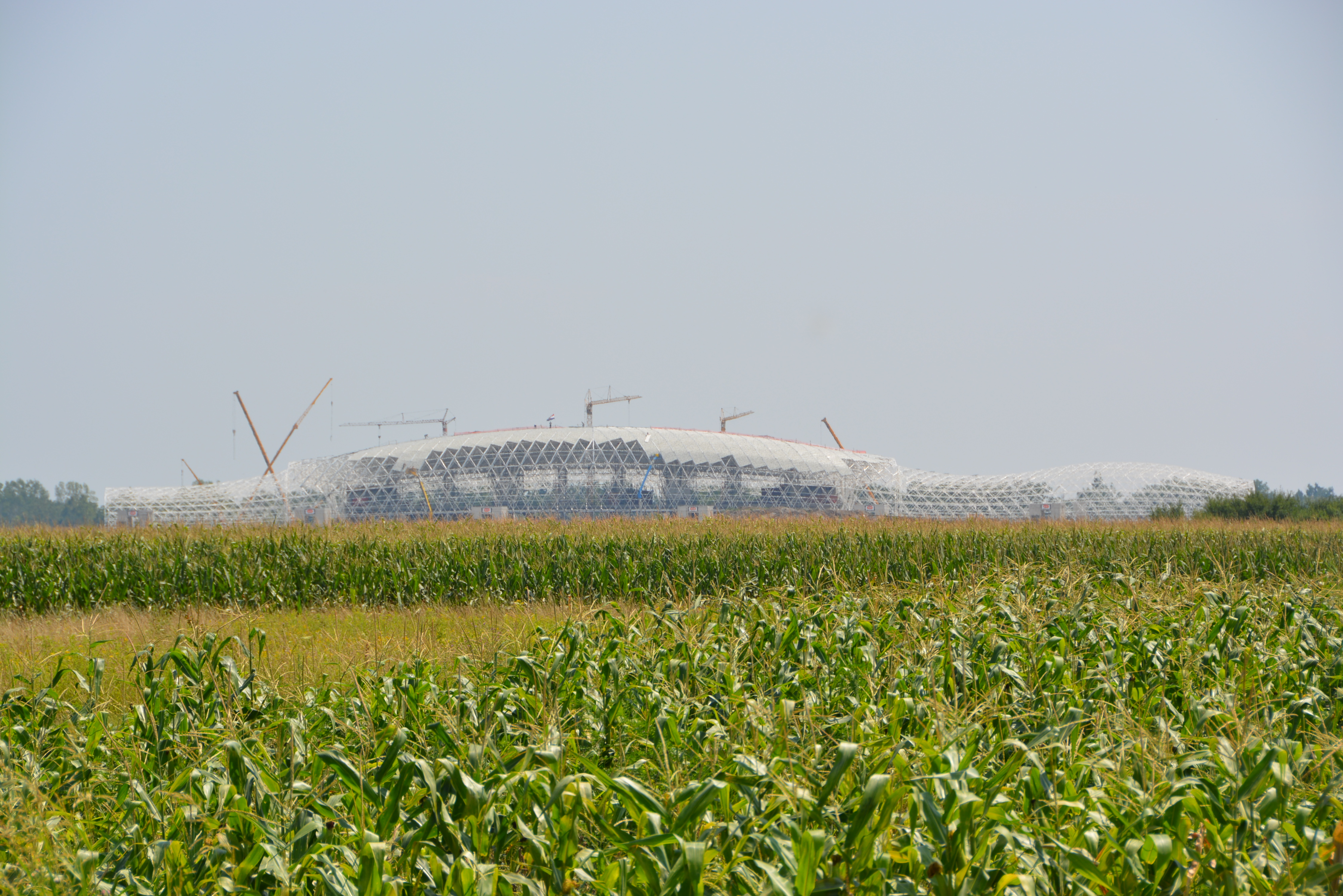
New terminal under construction, 2015

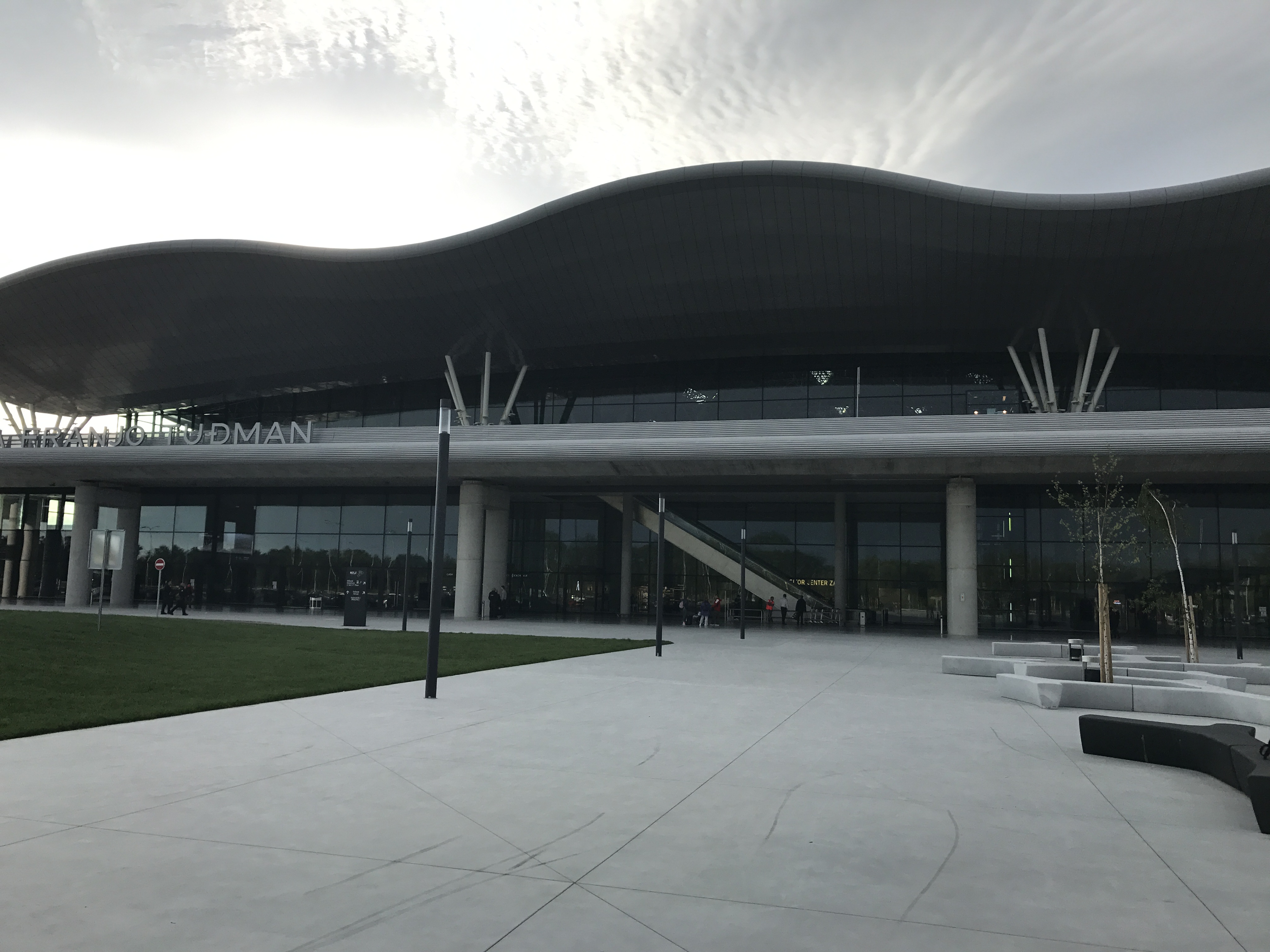
New passenger terminal after construction, 2017

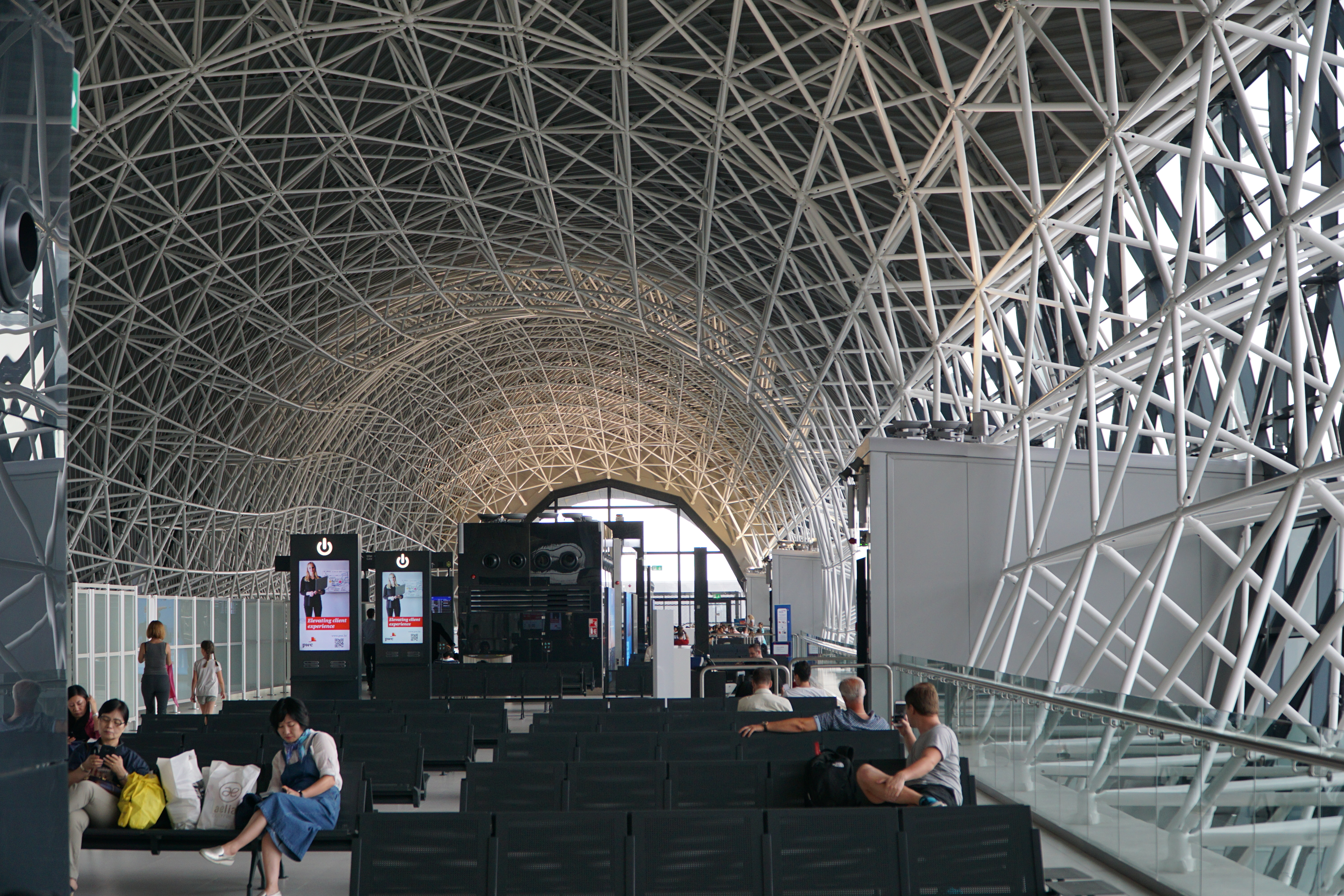
Departures area

Following an increase in passenger numbers and the necessity to upgrade its infrastructure, the airport installed a CAT-IIIb instrument landing system (ILS) in 2004. In 2008, a new VIP terminal was added and the terminal was extended to include extra amenities, restaurants and bars. The terminal was expanded to 15,500 m^{2} (167,000 sq ft). By 2010, the old terminal was nearing its maximum annual capacity. That year the passenger terminal received a major facelift in the course of which a viewing platform with a bar was added.

On 12 April 2012, the ZAIC consortium received a 30-year concession for the airport from the Government of Croatia. The consortium consists of Groupe ADP (21%), Bouygues Bâtiment International (21%), Marguerite Fund (21%), International Finance Corporation (17%), TAV Airports (15%) and Viadukt (5%). The concession includes financing, designing and constructing a new passenger terminal. The construction of a brand new 70,000 m^{2} (750,000 sq ft) terminal facility designed by Neidhardt architects of Zagreb and carried out by Bouygues Bâtiment International in partnership with Viadukt began on 18 December 2013 with the aim to replace the old terminal. It now has an initial annual capacity of 5.5 million passengers in the first phase and was officially completed in October 2016. The official inauguration of the terminal was on 28 March 2017. ZAIC now operates the entire airport, including the runways, passenger terminal, cargo terminal, car parks and future property developments, under a 30-year concession. This contract involves a total investment of around €324 million: €236 million for the design and construction of the new terminal and €88 million for operation of all airport infrastructure for the entire period of the concession.

On 27 February 2020, the runway, formerly designated as 05/23, was redesignated to 04/22 due to the change in magnetic declination.

On 30 March 2021, Irish low-cost airline Ryanair announced the opening of a new base in Zagreb commencing July 2021. The airline will be basing three Airbus A320-200 aircraft and start flights to 26 previously unserved destinations.

=== New terminal ===
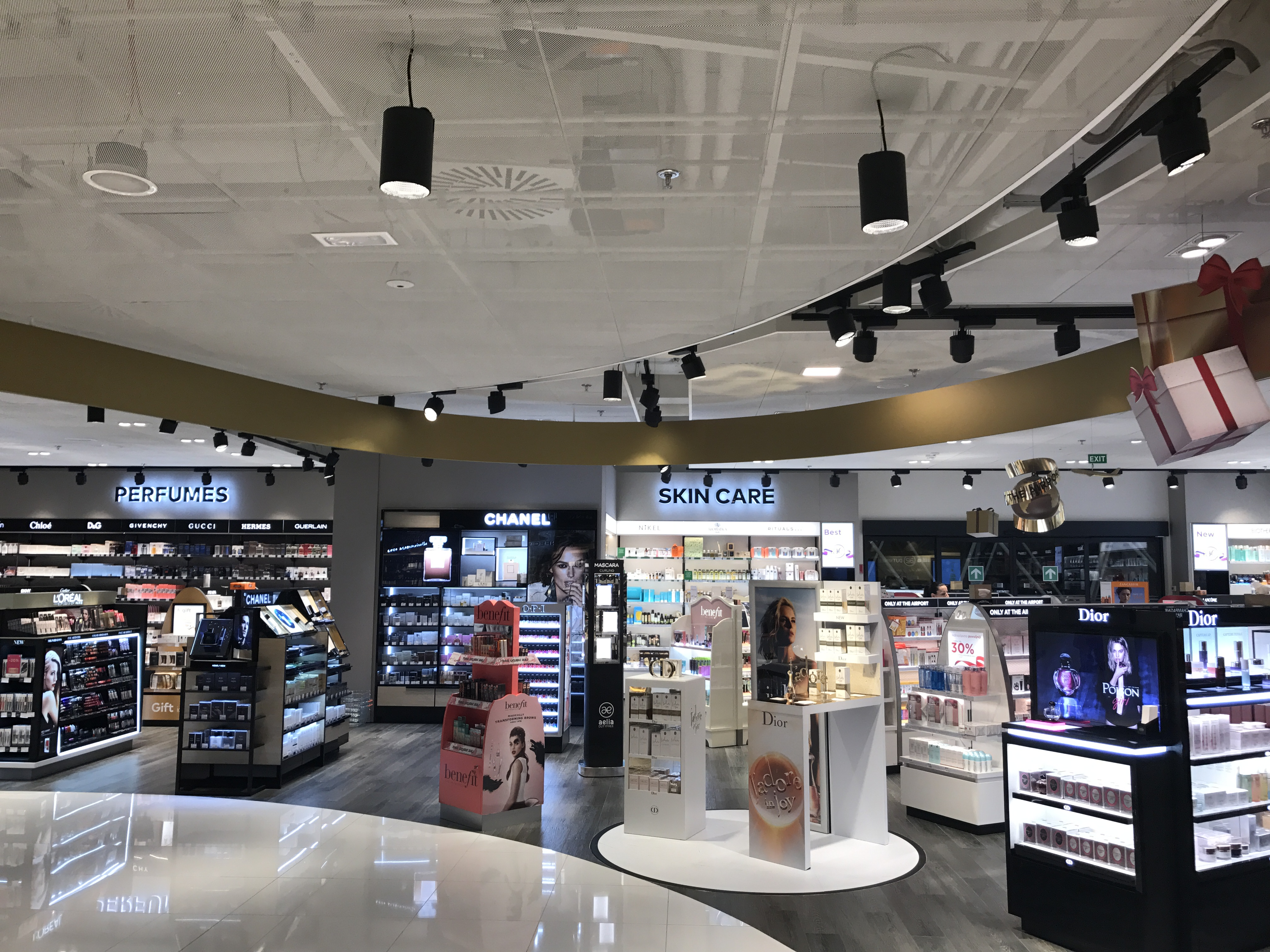
Duty-free shops

The current terminal building was opened to the public on 28 March 2017. It stretches over 65,800 m^{2} (708,000 sq ft) on three levels featuring four baggage carousels, eight air bridges, nine security checkpoints, 45 check-in desks, 23 passport control booths and a car park with the capacity of 1,250 vehicles. The new apron has three remote stands next to the terminal, while 23 stands at the old passenger building are also used during the peak season. Each of the aircraft parking positions at the facility includes a visual docking guidance system which gives information to a pilot on how to park their aircraft. The terminal itself features a large 600-square-metre (6,500 sq ft) duty-free shop operated by Aelia, 16 cafés, bars, restaurants and snack bars as well as 12 retail stores.

Enough space has been left for 30 additional check-in counters and two baggage carousels to be added once the new terminal reaches its current maximum capacity of 5 million passengers. Further extensions envisaged along the thirty-year concession period will potentially see expanding current apron from present 100,000 to 300,000 m^{2} (1,100,000 to 3,200,000 sq ft) and terminal capacity increased to 8 million through gradual expansion of the terminal in four Phase 2 expansions.

== Ground transportation ==
ZAG can be reached from the city centre by scheduled local bus services (No. 290) operated by ZET or scheduled coach services operated by Croatia Airlines' subsidiary Pleso Prijevoz.

== Climate ==
Since records began in 1981, the highest temperature recorded at the local weather station was 39.1 °C (102.4 °F), on 28 August 2012. The coldest temperature was −26.3 °C (−15.3 °F), on 17 January 1963.

== Airlines and destinations ==
=== Passenger ===
Airlines	Destinations
Aegean Airlines	Athens
Air China	Beijing–Capital, Bucharest–Otopeni
Air Dolomiti	Munich
Air France	Paris–Charles de Gaulle
Air Montenegro	Podgorica (begins 26 November 2026)
Air Serbia	Belgrade
Air Transat	Seasonal: Toronto–Pearson
Austrian Airlines	Vienna (ends 10 January 2027)
Croatia Airlines	Amsterdam, Barcelona, Berlin, Brussels, Copenhagen, Dubrovnik, Frankfurt, London–Heathrow, Madrid, Mostar, Munich, Paris–Charles de Gaulle, Pula, Rome–Fiumicino, Sarajevo, Skopje, Split, Stockholm–Arlanda, Vienna, Zadar, Zurich; Seasonal: Athens, Hamburg, Prague; Seasonal charter: Monastir, Tel Aviv
Eurowings	Cologne/Bonn, Stuttgart
flydubai	Dubai–International
Iberia	Seasonal: Madrid
KLM	Amsterdam
LOT Polish Airlines	Warsaw–Chopin
Lufthansa	Frankfurt, Munich
Pegasus Airlines	Istanbul–Sabiha Gökçen
Qatar Airways	Doha
Ryanair	Alicante, Basel/Mulhouse, Beauvais, Bergamo, Charleroi, Dublin, Eindhoven, Gothenburg, Karlsruhe/Baden-Baden, Lanzarote, London–Stansted, Málaga, Malta, Memmingen, Paphos, Rome–Fiumicino, Warsaw–Modlin, Weeze; Seasonal: Corfu, Girona, Kos, Malmö, Manchester, Naples, Palermo, Palma de Mallorca, Sandefjord, Thessaloniki
Sundor	Seasonal: Tel Aviv
Trade Air	Osijek
Trinity Airways	Seasonal: Seoul–Incheon
Turkish Airlines	Istanbul

=== Cargo ===
Airlines	Destinations
DHL Aviation	Leipzig/Halle

== Statistics ==
=== Traffic figures ===
Traffic at Zagreb Airport
Year	Passengers	Passenger % change	Aircraft movements	Aircraft movements% change	Cargo (tonnes)	Cargo % change
2014	2,430,971	▲5.7%	38,348	▲4.0%	8,855	▲15.0%
2015	2,587,798	▲6.4%	39,854	▲3.9%	9,225	▲4.2%
2016	2,766,087	▲6.9%	40,796	▲2.4%	10,074	▲9.2%
2017	3,092,047	▲11.8%	41,585	▲1.9%	11,719	▲11.7%
2018	3,336,310	▲7.9%	43,688	▲5.1%	13,676	▲16.7%
2019	3,435,531	▲3.0%	45,061	▲3.1%	12,881	▼5.8%
2020	924,823	▼73.1%	21,510	▼52.3%	9,852	▼22.3%
2021	1,404,478	▲51.9%	29,605	▲37.7%	10,834	▲10.0%
2022	3,124,605	▲122.5%	42,310	▲42.9%	11,372	▲5.0%
2023	3,723,650	▲19.2%	45,726	▲8.1%	10,859	▼6.7%
2024	4,316,619	▲15.9%	49,955	▲9.2%	13,025	▲19.9%
2025	4,721,563	▲9.4%	51,664	▲3.4%	12,408	▼4.7%
2026 (1.1.-31.10.)	4,070,188	▲0.6%	42,836	▼2.8%	9,590	▼8.0%

=== Passenger numbers ===
2025
Month	Passengers	Passengers cumulatively	Change (%)
January	280,524	280,524	▲12.4%
February	261,119	541,643	▲6.5%
March	315,323	856,966	▲4.8%
April	419,675	1,276,641	▲13.6%
May	437,568	1,714,209	▲9.5%
June	438,362	2,152,571	▲8.0%
July	470,365	2,622,936	▲8.7%
August	490,994	3,113,930	▲11.8%
September	470,887	3,584,817	▲11.4%
October	461,562	4,046,379	▲10.8%
November	340,201	4,386,580	▲7.8%
December	334,983	4,721,563	▲5.0%

2026
Month	Passengers	Passengers cumulatively	Change (%)
January	296,861	296,861	▲5.8%
February	281,489	578,350	▲7.8%
March	339,126	917,476	▲7.5%
April	415,218	1,332,694	▼1.1%
May	448,290	1,780,984	▲2.5%
June	438,575	2,219,552	▲0.05%
July	468,194	2,687,742	▼0.5%
August	479,275	3,167,017	▼2.4%
September	455,530	3,622,547	▼3.3%
October	447,641	4,070,188	▼3.0%
November			
December			

== See also ==
- Transport in Croatia
- List of airports in Croatia
- List of the busiest airports in Croatia
- List of the busiest airports in Europe
