= Zadar Airport =

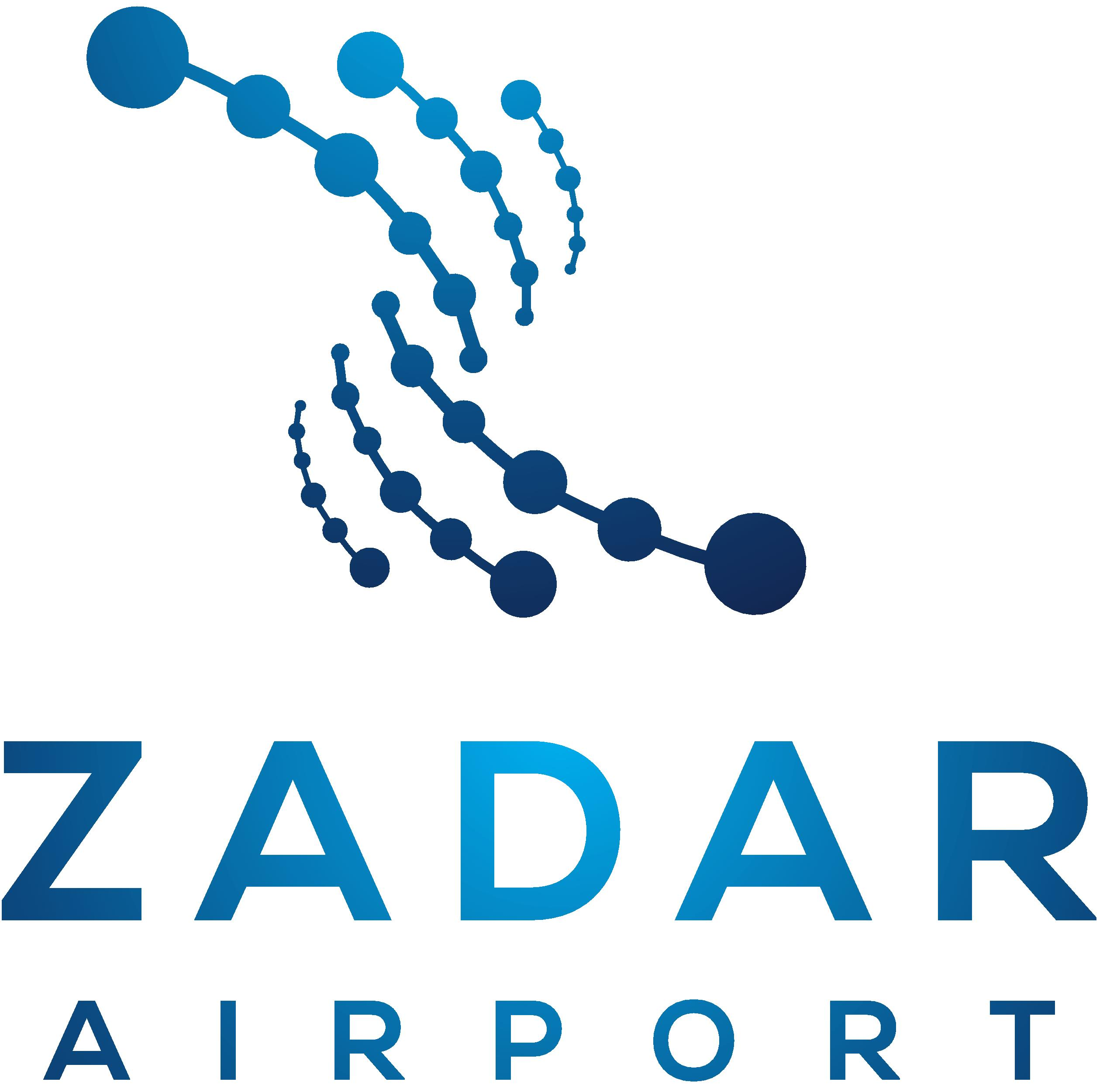

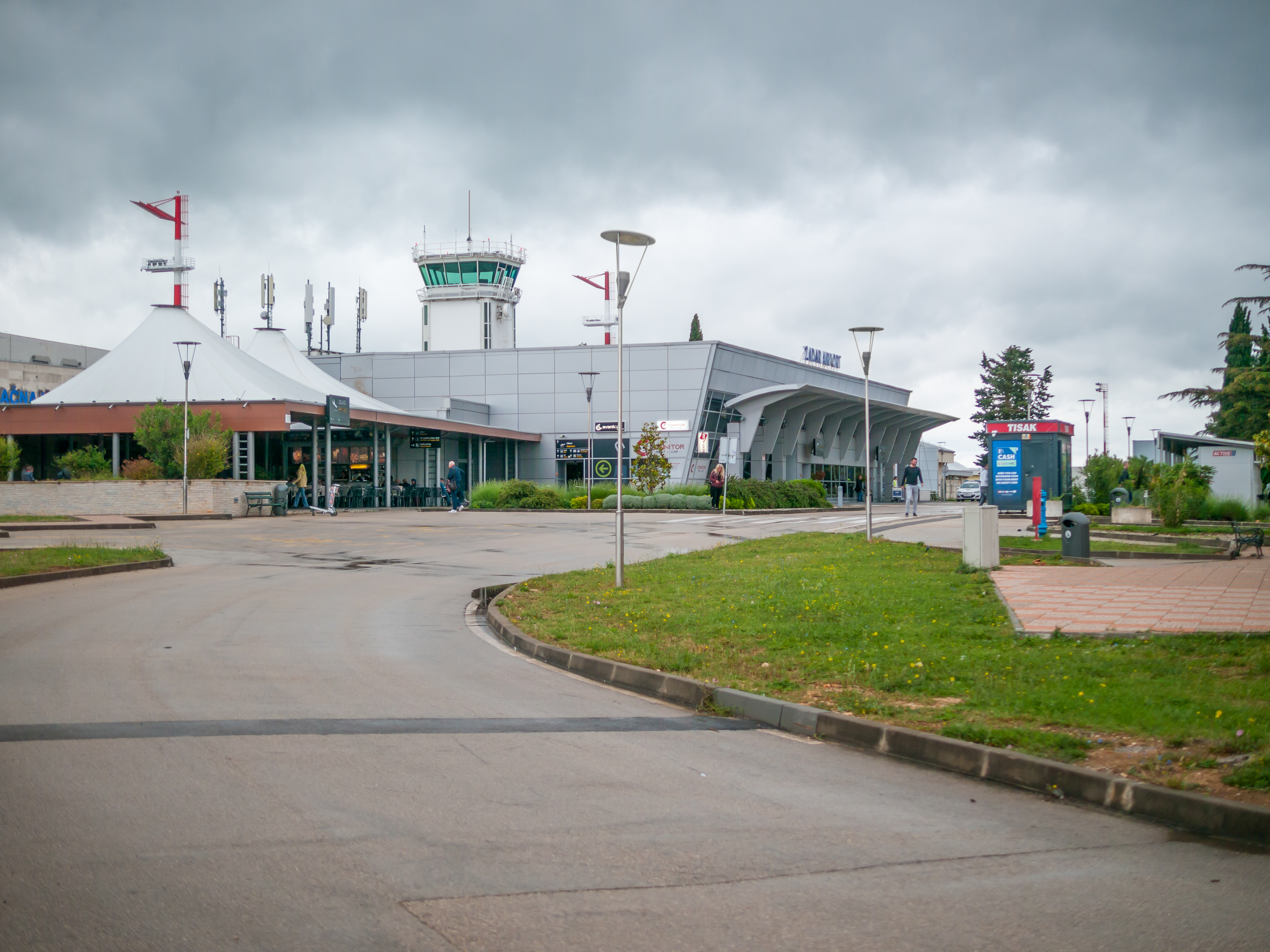
- IATA: ZAD; ICAO: LDZD

Summary
- Airport type: Public / Military
- Operator: Zadar Airport Ltd.
- Serves: Zadar
- Location: Zemunik Donji, Croatia
- Hub for: Ryanair
- Focus city for: Croatia Airlines
- Elevation AMSL: 289 ft (88 m)
- Coordinates: 44°06′30″N 015°20′48″E
- Website: www.zadar-airport.hr/en/

Maps
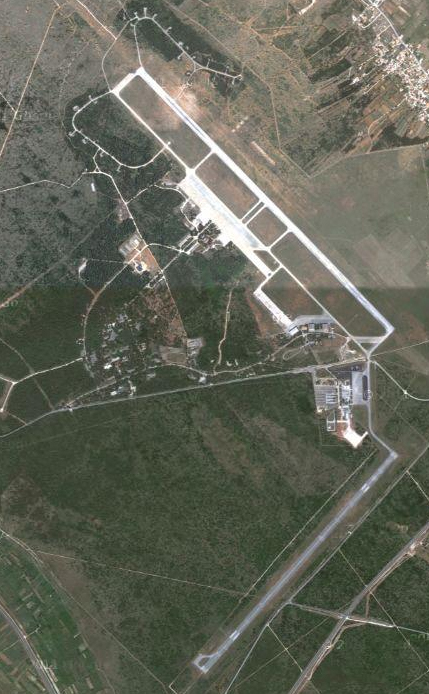
- Airport Satellite Diagram (2012)

- Location of the airport in Croatia

Runways
Direction	Length		Surface
Direction	m	ft	Surface
13/31	2,500	8,202	Concrete
04/22	2,000	6,562	Asphalt

Statistics (2025)
- Passengers: 1,639,167 ▲2.87%
- Croatian Aeronautical Information Publication

Zadar Airport (Croatian: Zračna luka Zadar; IATA: ZAD, ICAO: LDZD) is an international airport serving Zadar, Croatia. It is located in Zemunik Donji, 8 km (5 mi) from the centre of Zadar. With over 70 destinations on offer the airport handled around 1.6 million passengers in 2025. It is the fourth busiest airport in Croatia. It's the only airport in Croatia with 2 runways.

== History ==
As early as 1936, Zadar (then part of the Italian Province of Zara) had regular commercial flights, initially provided by Ala Littoria. Over time the airport has grown to become Croatia's fourth largest international airport. It used to be one of a few airports in the world where the taxiway crossed a public road. The road was closed on 7 April 2010 due to terms negotiated with the European Union during Croatian accession negotiations. In 2020, an underpass was built and the road was reopened.

In April 2013, Zadar Airport became a Ryanair base with a stationed Boeing 737-800. In December 2019, Lauda announced the stationing of three Airbus A320 aircraft during the summer 2020 timetable period. A set of 11 new routes was announced by the airline for summer 2020. Due to the ongoing COVID-19 pandemic the airline postponed the opening of the base to July 2021, where it will station two Airbus A320-200 and serve 37 destinations.

== Facilities ==
The airport is also a Croatian Air Force main training base. It used to be a base for Lufthansa's InterCockpit flight school.

== Airlines and destinations ==
The following airlines operate regular scheduled and charter flights at Zadar Airport:

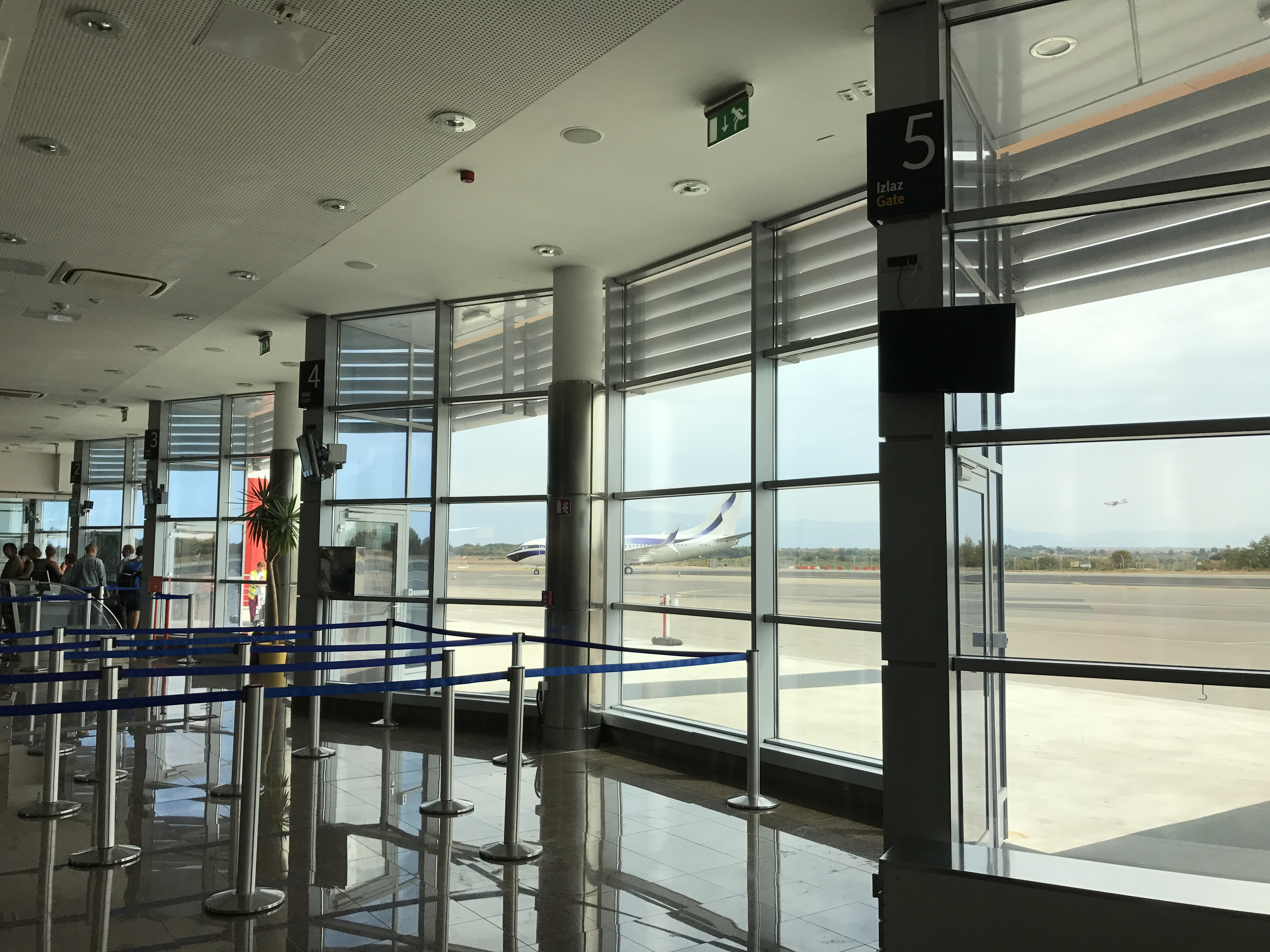
Waiting area

Airlines	Destinations
Air Serbia	Seasonal: Belgrade
Austrian Airlines	Seasonal: Vienna
Brussels Airlines	Seasonal: Brussels
Croatia Airlines	Pula, Zagreb; Seasonal: Munich
Discover Airlines	Seasonal: Frankfurt
EasyJet	Seasonal: Basel/Mulhouse, London–Gatwick
Edelweiss Air	Seasonal: Zürich
Eurowings	Seasonal: Cologne/Bonn, Düsseldorf, Hamburg, Stuttgart
Lufthansa	Seasonal: Munich
Luxair	Seasonal: Luxembourg
Norwegian Air Shuttle	Seasonal: Copenhagen
Ryanair	Seasonal: Aarhus, Barcelona, Bari, Beauvais, Bergamo, Berlin, Birmingham, Bologna, Bournemouth, Bratislava, Bucharest–Otopeni, Budapest, Charleroi, Cologne/Bonn, Copenhagen, Cork, Dublin, Edinburgh, Eindhoven, Gdańsk, Friedrichshafen (begins 3 May 2027), Gothenburg, Hahn, Helsinki, Karlsruhe/Baden-Baden, Katowice, Kaunas, Košice, Kraków, Leeds/Bradford, Liverpool, London–Stansted, Manchester, Marseille, Memmingen, Milan–Malpensa, Münster/Osnabrück, Newcastle upon Tyne, Nuremberg, Pisa, Poznań, Prague, Rome–Fiumicino, Rzeszów, Stockholm–Arlanda, Växjö, Vienna, Warsaw–Modlin, Weeze, Wrocław
Trade Air	Osijek; Seasonal: Rijeka
Transavia	Seasonal: Rotterdam/The Hague
Wizz Air	Seasonal: Budapest, Warsaw–Chopin

== Statistics ==
Traffic at Zadar Airport
Year	Passengers	Cargo (kg)
1976	146,000	N/A
2015	▼487,652	12,791
2016	▲520,226	26,450
2017	▲589,468	5,925
2018	▲604,039	19,953
2019	▲801,347	2,517
2020	▼120,747	50
2021	▲513,093	274
2022	▲1,102,381	1,045
2023	▲1,230,835	80
2024	▲1,593,413	150
2025	▲1,639,167	520
