= Grobničko Polje Airfield =

Grobničko Polje Airfield Zračna luka Grobničko Polje
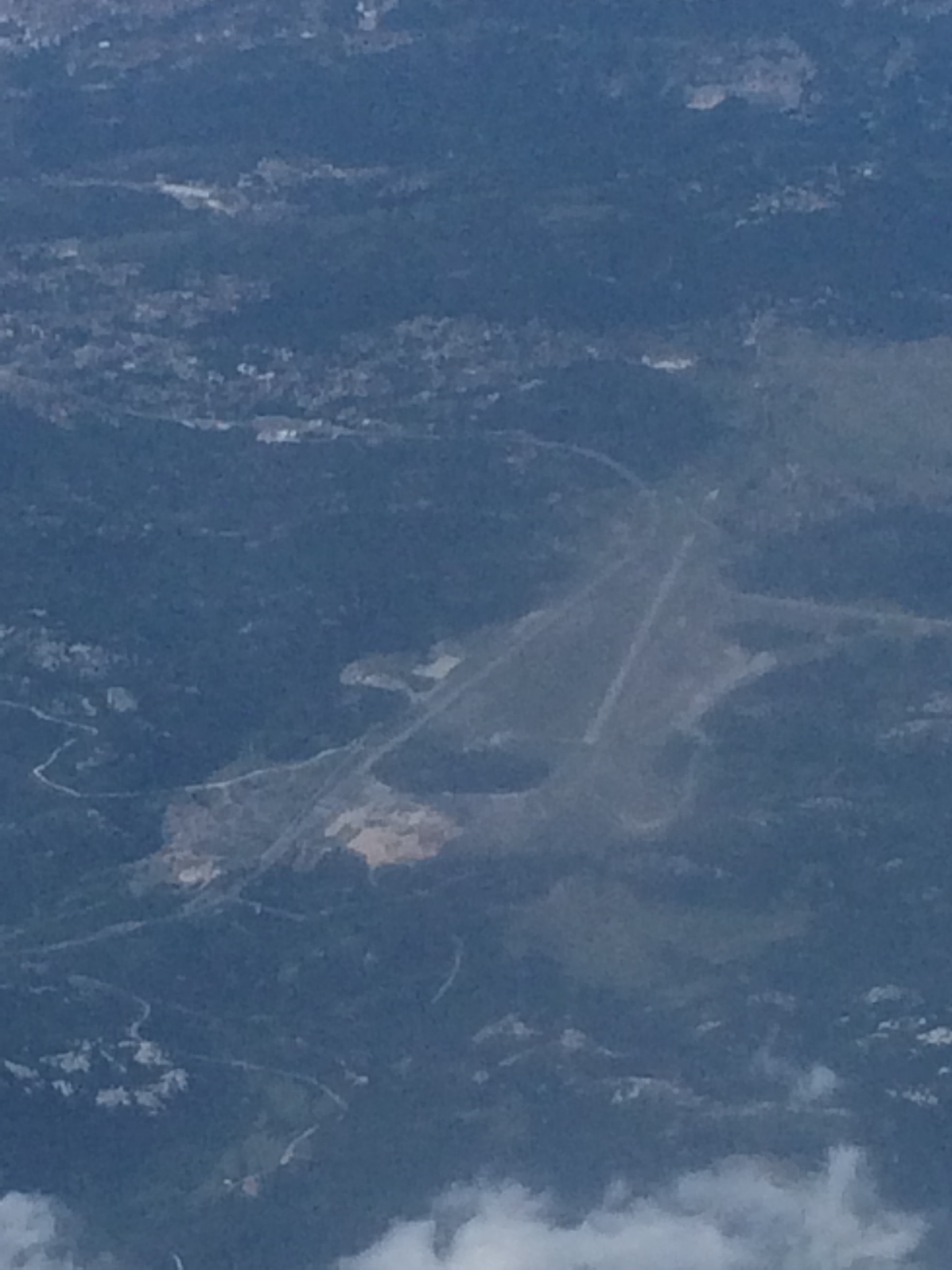
- IATA: none; ICAO: LDRG

Summary
- Serves: Grobnik, Croatia
- Elevation AMSL: 1,010 ft / 308 m
- Coordinates: 45°22′49″N 014°30′29″E

Map
- Location in Croatia

Runways
Direction	Length		Surface
Direction	m	ft	Surface
07/25	1,600	5,249	Concrete/asphalt
- Croatian Aeronautical Information Publication

Grobničko Polje Airfield (Croatian: Zračna luka Grobničko Polje) (ICAO: LDRG) is a recreational aerodrome in Grobnik, a small locality near Rijeka, in western Croatia.
