= Klisa =

Klisa may refer to:

- Klisa, Bihać, a village in Bosnia and Herzegovina
- Klisa, Serbia, a part of the city of Novi Sad, Serbia
- Klisa, Osijek-Baranja County, a village near Osijek, Croatia
- Klisa, Požega-Slavonia County, a village near Velika, Croatia
