= United Airlines =

Airline of the United States

United Airlines, Inc.

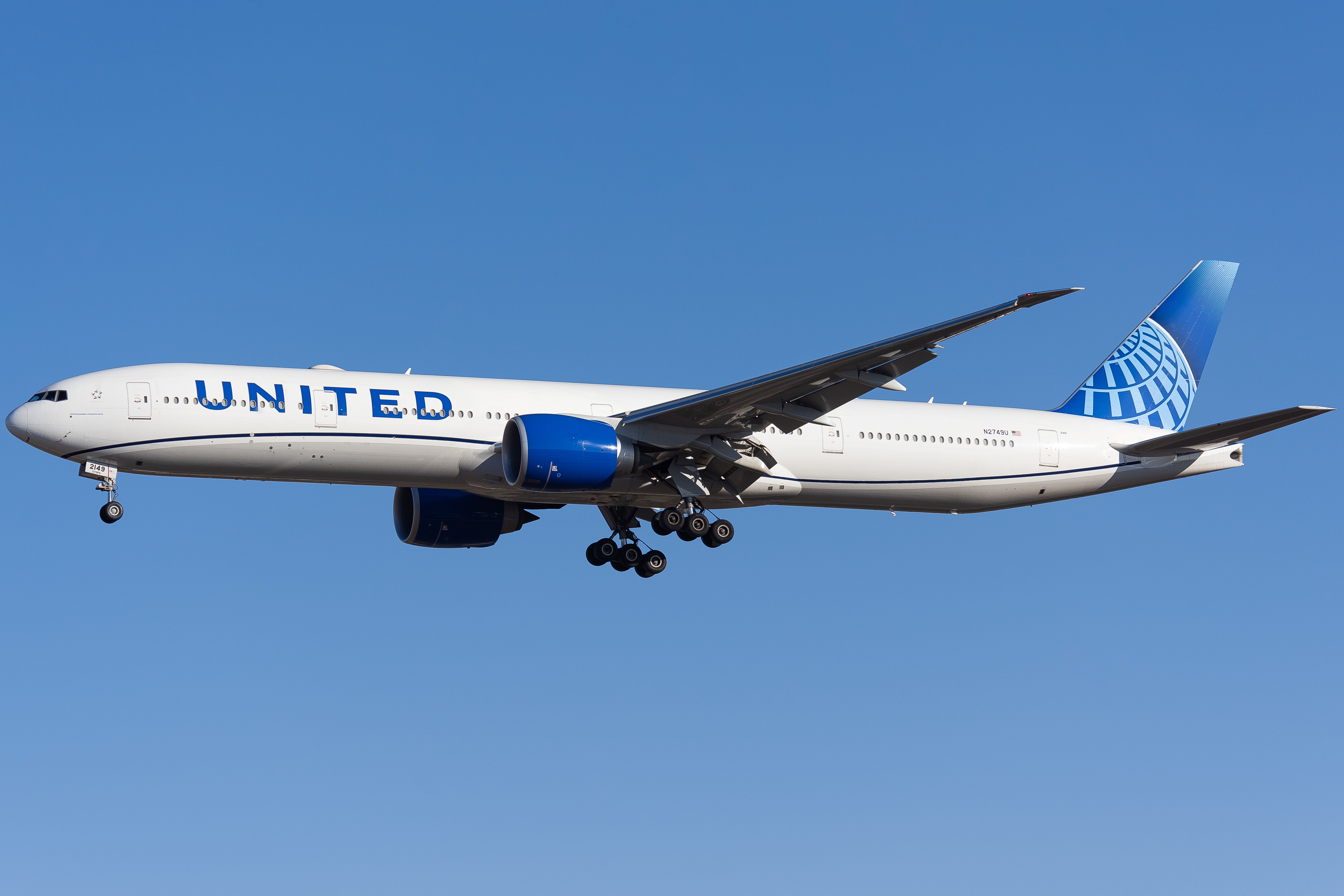
- A United Boeing 777-300ER
IATA	ICAO	Call sign
UA	UAL	UNITED
- Founded: March 28, 1931 (95 years ago) as a subsidiary of United Aircraft and Transport Corporation
- Commenced operations: March 28, 1931 (95 years ago)
- AOC #: CALA014A
- Hubs: Chicago–O'Hare; Denver; Guam; Houston–Intercontinental; Los Angeles; Newark; San Francisco; Washington–Dulles
- Frequent-flyer program: MileagePlus
- Alliance: Star Alliance
- Subsidiaries: United Express; Republic Airways Holdings (18.2%)
- Fleet size: 1,152
- Destinations: 411
- Parent company: United Airlines Holdings
- Traded as: Nasdaq: UAL; DJTA component; S&P 500 component
- ISIN: US9100471096
- Headquarters: Willis Tower, Chicago, Illinois, United States
- Key people: Scott Kirby (CEO); Edward Philip (chairman); Brett Hart (president)
- Founder: William E. Boeing
- Revenue: ▲US$59.1 billion (2025)
- Operating income: ▼US$4.7 billion (2025)
- Net income: ▲US$3.4 billion (2025)
- Total assets: ▲US$76.4 billion (2025)
- Total equity: ▲US$15.3 billion (2025)
- Employees: ▲113,200 (2025)
- Website: www.united.com

Notes
- Financials as of December 31, 2025. References

United Airlines, Inc. is a major airline in the United States headquartered in Chicago, Illinois. It operates an extensive domestic and international route network across the United States and to destinations on six continents. Regional service is provided by independent carriers operating under the United Express brand, and the Star Alliance, of which United was one of the five founding airlines, extends its network throughout the world.

The principal figure behind the formation of the airline was William E. Boeing, founder of the Boeing Aircraft Company in 1916. He launched an air service between Victoria, British Columbia, and Seattle and later acquired three additional airlines, completing the merger by 1931 to form United Air Lines. Through successive mergers and acquisitions, United has remained one of the largest airlines in the world for much of its history.

== History ==
United Airlines was formed in 1931 as a subsidiary of United Aircraft and Transport Corporation to manage a group of airlines controlled by William Boeing, including Boeing Air Transport, National Air Transport, Pacific Air Transport and Varney Air Lines, all of which held U.S. Air Mail contracts. Of its predecessor companies, the first to commence cargo (airmail) operations was Varney Air Lines on April 6, 1926, a date United later celebrated as its centenary. The 1934 Air Mail scandal led to the dissolution of the parent corporation, resulting in the separation of Boeing, United Aircraft (now RTX), and United Air Lines, all of which continued as independent major American companies.

As an independent company, United expanded rapidly. In 1933, it introduced the Boeing 247, the first modern airliner, enabling non-stop transcontinental travel. During World War II, United modified the aircraft for military use and transporting supplies. After the war, United capitalized on the aviation boom, and in 1961 merged with Capital Airlines, briefly becoming the world's second-largest airline. United was a major proponent of airline deregulation in the 1970s and would ultimately benefit from the post-deregulation decline of Pan American World Airways acquiring Pan Am's Pacific route authority in 1985, its London Heathrow operation in 1991, and its Latin America and Caribbean network in 1992. In 1997, United was one of the five airlines to launch Star Alliance, the first global airline alliance.

United suffered significant losses during the September 11 attacks, when two of its aircraft—a Boeing 757 and a Boeing 767—were hijacked and deliberately crashed. Already facing financial difficulties, the airline was further affected by the post-attack economic downturn and filed for bankruptcy in 2002. United emerged from bankruptcy in 2006 after restructuring and, in 2010, merged with Continental Airlines, creating one of the world's largest airlines.

== Network ==
=== Destinations ===
As of 2026, United Airlines flies (or has flown) to the following destinations. This table does not include destinations served by United's regional subsidiary, United Express.

Country or territory		City	Airport	Notes	Refs
Antigua and Barbuda		Coolidge	V. C. Bird International Airport		
Argentina	Autonomous City of Buenos Aires	Buenos Aires	Ministro Pistarini International Airport		
Aruba		Oranjestad	Queen Beatrix International Airport		
Australia	New South Wales	Sydney	Sydney Airport		
Australia	Queensland	Brisbane	Brisbane Airport		
Australia	Queensland	Cairns (Note: Cairns' sole Guam route was previously operated by Continental Airlines, United's now-defunct subsidiary.)	Cairns Airport	Terminated	
Australia	South Australia	Adelaide	Adelaide Airport	Seasonal	
Australia	Victoria	Melbourne	Melbourne Airport		
Bahamas		Nassau	Lynden Pindling International Airport		
Bahrain		Manama	Bahrain International Airport	Terminated	
Barbados		Bridgetown	Grantley Adams International Airport		
Belgium		Brussels	Brussels Airport		
Belize		Belize City	Philip S. W. Goldson International Airport		
Bermuda		Hamilton	L.F. Wade International Airport		
Bonaire		Kralendijk	Flamingo International Airport		
Brazil	Minas Gerais	Belo Horizonte	Tancredo Neves International Airport	Terminated	
Brazil	Rio de Janeiro	Rio de Janeiro	Rio de Janeiro/Galeão International Airport		
Brazil	São Paulo	São Paulo	São Paulo/Guarulhos International Airport		
Canada	Alberta	Calgary	Calgary International Airport		
Canada	Alberta	Edmonton	Edmonton International Airport		
Canada	British Columbia	Vancouver	Vancouver International Airport		
Canada	Manitoba	Winnipeg	Winnipeg James Armstrong Richardson International Airport		
Canada	Newfoundland and Labrador	St. John's	St. John's International Airport	Terminated	
Canada	Nova Scotia	Halifax	Halifax Stanfield International Airport		
Canada	Quebec	Montreal	Montréal–Trudeau International Airport	Seasonal	
Canada	Ontario	Toronto	Toronto Pearson International Airport		
Cayman Islands	Grand Cayman	George Town	Owen Roberts International Airport		
Chile		Santiago	Arturo Merino Benítez International Airport		
China		Beijing	Beijing Capital International Airport		
China		Chengdu	Chengdu Shuangliu International Airport	Terminated	
China		Hangzhou	Hangzhou Xiaoshan International Airport	Terminated	
China		Shanghai	Shanghai Pudong International Airport		
China		Xi'an	Xi'an Xianyang International Airport	Terminated	
Colombia		Bogotá	El Dorado International Airport		
Colombia		Medellín	José María Córdova International Airport		
Costa Rica		Liberia	Daniel Oduber Quirós International Airport		
Costa Rica		San José	Juan Santamaría International Airport		
Croatia		Dubrovnik	Dubrovnik Airport	Seasonal	
Croatia		Split	Split Airport	Seasonal	
Cuba		Havana	José Martí International Airport	Terminated	
Curaçao		Willemstad	Curaçao International Airport	Seasonal	
Denmark		Copenhagen	Copenhagen Airport	Terminated	
Dominican Republic		Puerto Plata	Gregorio Luperón International Airport		
Dominican Republic		Punta Cana	Punta Cana International Airport		
Dominican Republic		Santiago de los Caballeros	Cibao International Airport		
Dominican Republic		Santo Domingo	Las Américas International Airport		
Ecuador		Quito	Mariscal Sucre International Airport		
El Salvador		San Salvador	El Salvador International Airport		
Federated States of Micronesia	Chuuk	Weno	Chuuk International Airport		
Federated States of Micronesia	Kosrae	Tafunsak	Kosrae International Airport		
Federated States of Micronesia	Pohnpei	Palikir	Pohnpei International Airport		
Federated States of Micronesia	Yap	Colonia	Yap International Airport		
France		Marseille	Marseille Provence Airport	Begins 4 June 2027	
France		Nice	Nice Côte d'Azur Airport		
France		Paris	Charles de Gaulle Airport		
France		Toulouse	Toulouse–Blagnac Airport	Begins 26 April 2027	
French Polynesia	Tahiti	Papeete	Faa'a International Airport		
Germany	Baden-Württemberg	Stuttgart	Stuttgart Airport	Terminated	
Germany	Bavaria	Munich	Munich Airport		
Germany	Berlin	Berlin	Berlin Brandenburg Airport		
Germany	Berlin	Berlin	Berlin Tegel Airport	Airport closed	
Germany	Hamburg	Hamburg	Hamburg Airport	Terminated	
Germany	Hesse	Frankfurt	Frankfurt Airport		
Germany	North Rhine-Westphalia	Düsseldorf	Düsseldorf Airport	Terminated	
Ghana		Accra	Accra International Airport		
Greece		Athens	Athens International Airport	Seasonal	
Greenland		Nuuk	Nuuk Airport	Seasonal	
Guatemala		Guatemala City	La Aurora International Airport		
Honduras		Roatán	Juan Manuel Gálvez International Airport		
Honduras		San Pedro Sula	Ramón Villeda Morales International Airport		
Honduras		Tegucigalpa	Comayagua International Airport		
Hong Kong		Hong Kong	Hong Kong International Airport (Chek Lap Kok)		
Hong Kong		Hong Kong	Hong Kong International Airport (Kai Tak)	Airport closed	
Iceland		Reykjavík	Keflavík International Airport	Seasonal	
India	Maharashtra	Mumbai	Chhatrapati Shivaji Maharaj International Airport	Terminated	
India	National Capital Territory	Delhi	Indira Gandhi International Airport		
Ireland		Dublin	Dublin Airport		
Ireland		Shannon	Shannon Airport	Seasonal	
Israel		Tel Aviv	Ben Gurion Airport		
Italy	Apulia	Bari	Bari Karol Wojtyła Airport	Seasonal	
Italy	Campania	Naples	Naples International Airport	Seasonal	
Italy	Lazio	Rome	Leonardo da Vinci–Fiumicino Airport		
Italy	Lombardy	Milan	Milan Malpensa Airport		
Italy	Sardinia	Olbia	Olbia Costa Smeralda Airport	Begins 27 May 2027	
Italy	Sicily	Catania	Catania–Fontanarossa Airport	Begins 28 May 2027	
Italy	Sicily	Palermo	Palermo Airport	Seasonal	
Italy	Veneto	Venice	Venice Marco Polo Airport	Seasonal	
Jamaica		Montego Bay	Sangster International Airport		
Japan		Fukuoka	Fukuoka Airport	Terminated	
Japan		Hiroshima	Hiroshima Airport	Terminated	
Japan		Nagoya	Chubu Centrair International Airport		
Japan		Nagoya	Nagoya Komaki Airport	Terminated	
Japan		Naha	Naha Airport	Resumes 27 March 2027	
Japan		Niigata	Niigata Airport	Terminated	
Japan		Okayama	Okayama Airport	Terminated	
Japan		Osaka	Kansai International Airport		
Japan		Sapporo	New Chitose Airport	Terminated	
Japan		Sendai	Sendai Airport	Terminated	
Japan		Tokyo	Haneda Airport		
Japan		Tokyo	Narita International Airport		
Jordan		Amman	Amman International Airport	Terminated	
Kuwait		Kuwait City	Kuwait International Airport	Terminated	
Luxembourg		Luxembourg City	Luxembourg Airport	Begins 2 April 2027	
Marshall Islands		Kwajalein	Bucholz Army Airfield		
Marshall Islands		Majuro	Marshall Islands International Airport		
Mexico	Querétaro	Querétaro	Querétaro Intercontinental Airport		
Mexico	Baja California Sur	San José del Cabo	Los Cabos International Airport		
Mexico	Distrito Federal	Mexico City	Mexico City International Airport		
Mexico	Guanajuato	León	Bajío International Airport		
Mexico	Guerrero	Acapulco	Acapulco International Airport	Terminated	
Mexico	Guerrero	Ixtapa	Ixtapa-Zihuatanejo International Airport	Seasonal	
Mexico	Jalisco	Guadalajara	Guadalajara International Airport		
Mexico	Jalisco	Puerto Vallarta	Licenciado Gustavo Díaz Ordaz International Airport		
Mexico	Nuevo Leon	Monterrey	Monterrey International Airport		
Mexico	Quintana Roo	Cancún	Cancún International Airport		
Mexico	Quintana Roo	Cozumel	Cozumel International Airport		
Mexico	Sinaloa	Mazatlán	Mazatlán International Airport	Terminated	
Mexico	Yucatán	Mérida	Mérida International Airport		
Mexico	Veracruz	Veracruz	Veracruz International Airport		
Mongolia		Ulaanbaatar	Chinggis Khaan International Airport	Seasonal	
Morocco		Marrakesh	Marrakesh Menara Airport	Seasonal	
Netherlands		Amsterdam	Amsterdam Airport Schiphol		
New Zealand		Auckland	Auckland Airport		
New Zealand		Christchurch	Christchurch Airport	Seasonal	
Nicaragua		Managua	Augusto C. Sandino International Airport		
Nigeria	Lagos	Lagos	Murtala Muhammed International Airport		
Norway		Bergen	Bergen Flesland Airport	Terminated	
Norway		Oslo	Oslo Gardermoen Airport	Terminated	
Palau		Koror	Roman Tmetuchl International Airport		
Panama		Panama City	Tocumen International Airport		
Peru		Lima	Jorge Chávez International Airport		
Philippines		Cebu	Mactan–Cebu International Airport		
Philippines		Manila	Ninoy Aquino International Airport		
Portugal		Faro	Faro Airport	Seasonal	
Portugal		Funchal	Madeira Airport	Seasonal	
Portugal		Lisbon	Lisbon Airport		
Portugal		Ponta Delgada	Ponta Delgada Airport	Seasonal	
Portugal		Porto	Francisco Sá Carneiro Airport	Seasonal	
Portugal		Terceira	Lajes Airport	Begins 9 June 2027	
Qatar		Doha	Hamad International Airport	Terminated	
Russia	Moscow	Moscow	Domodedovo International Airport	Terminated	
Saint Lucia		Vieux Fort	Hewanorra International Airport		
Saudi Arabia		Dhahran	Dhahran International Airport	Airport closed	
Saudi Arabia		Jeddah	King Abdulaziz International Airport	Terminated	
Saudi Arabia		Riyadh	King Khalid International Airport	Terminated	
Senegal		Dakar	Blaise Diagne International Airport	Terminated	
Singapore		Singapore	Changi Airport		
Sint Maarten		Philipsburg	Princess Juliana International Airport		
Slovenia		Ljubljana	Ljubljana Airport	Begins 12 May 2027	
South Africa	Gauteng	Johannesburg	O. R. Tambo International Airport		
South Africa	Western Cape	Cape Town	Cape Town International Airport		
South Korea		Seoul	Gimpo International Airport	Terminated	
South Korea		Seoul	Incheon International Airport		
Spain	Andalusia	Málaga	Málaga Airport	Seasonal	
Spain	Balearic Islands	Ibiza	Ibiza Airport	Begins 31 May 2027	
Spain	Balearic Islands	Palma de Mallorca	Palma de Mallorca Airport	Seasonal	
Spain	Basque Country	Bilbao	Bilbao Airport	Seasonal	
Spain	Canary Islands	Tenerife	Tenerife South Airport	Terminated	
Spain	Catalonia	Barcelona	Josep Tarradellas Barcelona–El Prat Airport		
Spain	Community of Madrid	Madrid	Adolfo Suárez Madrid–Barajas Airport		
Spain	Galicia	Santiago de Compostela	Santiago–Rosalía de Castro Airport	Seasonal	
Spain	Valencian Community	Valencia	Valencia Airport	Begins 2 June 2027	
St. Kitts and Nevis	Saint Kitts	Basseterre	Robert L. Bradshaw International Airport	Seasonal	
Sweden		Stockholm	Stockholm Arlanda Airport	Seasonal	
Switzerland	Geneva	Geneva	Geneva Airport		
Switzerland	Zürich	Zürich	Zürich Airport		
Taiwan		Kaohsiung	Kaohsiung International Airport		
Taiwan		Taipei	Taoyuan International Airport		
Thailand		Bangkok	Don Mueang International Airport	Terminated	
Thailand		Bangkok	Suvarnabhumi Airport		
Trinidad and Tobago		Port of Spain	Piarco International Airport		
Turkey		Istanbul	Istanbul Atatürk Airport	Terminated	
Turks and Caicos Islands		Providenciales	Providenciales International Airport		
United Arab Emirates	Dubai	Dubai	Dubai International Airport		
United Kingdom	England	Birmingham	Birmingham Airport	Terminated	
United Kingdom	England	London	Heathrow Airport		
United Kingdom	England	Manchester	Manchester Airport	Terminated	
United Kingdom	England	Newcastle upon Tyne	Newcastle Airport	Terminated	
United Kingdom	Northern Ireland	Belfast	Belfast International Airport	Terminated	
United Kingdom	Scotland	Edinburgh	Edinburgh Airport		
United Kingdom	Scotland	Glasgow	Glasgow Airport	Seasonal	
United States	Alabama	Birmingham	Birmingham–Shuttlesworth International Airport		
United States	Alabama	Huntsville	Huntsville International Airport		
United States	Alabama	Mobile	Mobile Regional Airport		
United States	Alaska	Anchorage	Ted Stevens Anchorage International Airport		
United States	Alaska	Fairbanks	Fairbanks International Airport	Seasonal	
United States	Arizona	Phoenix	Phoenix Sky Harbor International Airport		
United States	Arizona	Prescott	Prescott Regional Airport		
United States	Arizona	Tucson	Tucson International Airport		
United States	California	Burbank	Bob Hope Airport		
United States	California	Eureka	Arcata–Eureka Airport		
United States	California	Fresno	Fresno Yosemite International Airport		
United States	California	Los Angeles	Los Angeles International Airport	Hub	
United States	California	Oakland	Oakland International Airport	Terminated	
United States	California	Ontario	Ontario International Airport		
United States	California	Orange County/Santa Ana	John Wayne Airport		
United States	California	Palm Springs	Palm Springs International Airport		
United States	California	Redding	Redding Municipal Airport		
United States	California	Sacramento	Sacramento International Airport		
United States	California	San Diego	San Diego International Airport		
United States	California	San Francisco	San Francisco International Airport	Hub	
United States	California	San Jose	San Jose International Airport		
United States	California	Santa Barbara	Santa Barbara Municipal Airport		
United States	Colorado	Colorado Springs	Colorado Springs Airport		
United States	Colorado	Denver	Denver International Airport	Hub	
United States	Colorado	Denver	Stapleton International Airport	Airport closed	
United States	Colorado	Montrose	Montrose Regional Airport	Seasonal	
United States	Colorado	Vail	Eagle County Airport		
United States	Connecticut	Hartford	Bradley International Airport		
United States	District of Columbia	Washington, D.C.	Ronald Reagan Washington National Airport		
United States	District of Columbia	Washington, D.C.	Dulles International Airport	Hub	
United States	Florida	Fort Lauderdale	Fort Lauderdale–Hollywood International Airport		
United States	Florida	Fort Myers	Southwest Florida International Airport		
United States	Florida	Jacksonville	Jacksonville International Airport		
United States	Florida	Miami	Miami International Airport		
United States	Florida	Orlando	Orlando International Airport		
United States	Florida	Panama City	Northwest Florida Beaches International Airport	Seasonal	
United States	Florida	Pensacola	Pensacola International Airport		
United States	Florida	Sarasota	Sarasota–Bradenton International Airport		
United States	Florida	Tampa	Tampa International Airport		
United States	Florida	West Palm Beach	Palm Beach International Airport		
United States	Georgia	Atlanta	Hartsfield–Jackson Atlanta International Airport		
United States	Georgia	Savannah	Savannah/Hilton Head International Airport		
United States	Guam	Hagåtña	Antonio B. Won Pat International Airport	Hub	
United States	Hawaii	Honolulu	Daniel K. Inouye International Airport		
United States	Hawaii	Kahului	Kahului Airport		
United States	Hawaii	Kailua-Kona	Kona International Airport		
United States	Hawaii	Lihue	Lihue Airport		
United States	Idaho	Boise	Boise Airport		
United States	Illinois	Chicago	O'Hare International Airport	Hub	
United States	Illinois	Chicago	Midway International Airport	Terminated	
United States	Indiana	Indianapolis	Indianapolis International Airport		
United States	Iowa	Cedar Rapids	Eastern Iowa Airport		
United States	Iowa	Des Moines	Des Moines International Airport		
United States	Kansas	Wichita	Wichita Dwight D. Eisenhower National Airport		
United States	Kentucky	Louisville	Louisville International Airport		
United States	Louisiana	New Orleans	Louis Armstrong New Orleans International Airport		
United States	Maine	Portland	Portland International Jetport		
United States	Maryland	Baltimore	Baltimore/Washington International Airport		
United States	Massachusetts	Boston	Logan International Airport		
United States	Michigan	Detroit	Detroit Metropolitan Airport		
United States	Michigan	Grand Rapids	Gerald R. Ford International Airport		
United States	Michigan	Traverse City	Cherry Capital Airport		
United States	Minnesota	Duluth	Duluth International Airport	Terminated	
United States	Minnesota	Minneapolis/St. Paul	Minneapolis–Saint Paul International Airport		
United States	Minnesota	Rochester	Rochester International Airport	Terminated	
United States	Missouri	Kansas City	Kansas City International Airport		
United States	Missouri	St. Louis	St. Louis Lambert International Airport		
United States	Montana	Billings	Billings Logan International Airport		
United States	Montana	Bozeman	Bozeman Yellowstone International Airport		
United States	Montana	Kalispell	Glacier Park International Airport		
United States	Montana	Missoula	Missoula International Airport		
United States	Nebraska	Omaha	Eppley Airfield		
United States	Nevada	Las Vegas	Harry Reid International Airport		
United States	Nevada	Reno	Reno–Tahoe International Airport		
United States	New Hampshire	Manchester	Manchester–Boston Regional Airport		
United States	New Jersey	Newark	Newark Airport	Hub	
United States	New Mexico	Albuquerque	Albuquerque International Sunport		
United States	New York	Albany	Albany International Airport		
United States	New York	Buffalo	Buffalo Niagara International Airport		
United States	New York	New York City	John F. Kennedy International Airport	Terminated	
United States	New York	New York City	LaGuardia Airport		
United States	New York	Rochester	Greater Rochester International Airport		
United States	New York	Syracuse	Syracuse Hancock International Airport		
United States	North Carolina	Charlotte	Charlotte Douglas International Airport		
United States	North Carolina	Greensboro	Piedmont Triad International Airport		
United States	North Carolina	Raleigh	Raleigh–Durham International Airport		
United States	North Carolina	Wilmington	Wilmington International Airport		
United States	Northern Mariana Islands	Saipan	Francisco C. Ada International Airport		
United States	Ohio	Cincinnati	Cincinnati/Northern Kentucky International Airport		
United States	Ohio	Cleveland	Cleveland Hopkins International Airport		
United States	Ohio	Columbus	John Glenn Columbus International Airport		
United States	Ohio	Dayton	Dayton International Airport	Terminated	
United States	Oklahoma	Oklahoma City	Will Rogers World Airport		
United States	Oklahoma	Tulsa	Tulsa International Airport		
United States	Oregon	Eugene	Eugene Airport		
United States	Oregon	Medford	Rogue Valley International–Medford Airport		
United States	Oregon	Portland	Portland International Airport		
United States	Oregon	Redmond/Bend	Roberts Field		
United States	Pennsylvania	Harrisburg	Harrisburg International Airport		
United States	Pennsylvania	Philadelphia	Philadelphia International Airport		
United States	Pennsylvania	Pittsburgh	Pittsburgh International Airport		
United States	Puerto Rico	Aguadilla	Rafael Hernández Airport		
United States	Puerto Rico	San Juan	Luis Muñoz Marín International Airport		
United States	Rhode Island	Providence	Rhode Island T. F. Green International Airport	Seasonal	
United States	South Carolina	Charleston	Charleston International Airport		
United States	South Carolina	Myrtle Beach	Myrtle Beach International Airport		
United States	South Dakota	Rapid City	Rapid City Regional Airport		
United States	South Dakota	Sioux Falls	Sioux Falls Regional Airport		
United States	Tennessee	Knoxville	McGhee Tyson Airport		
United States	Tennessee	Memphis	Memphis International Airport		
United States	Tennessee	Nashville	Nashville International Airport		
United States	Texas	Austin	Austin–Bergstrom International Airport		
United States	Texas	Dallas/Fort Worth	Dallas Fort Worth International Airport		
United States	Texas	El Paso	El Paso International Airport		
United States	Texas	Houston	George Bush Intercontinental Airport	Hub	
United States	Texas	Houston	William P. Hobby Airport	Terminated	
United States	Texas	McAllen	McAllen Miller International Airport		
United States	Texas	Midland/Odessa	Midland International Air and Space Port		
United States	Texas	San Antonio	San Antonio International Airport		
United States	U.S. Virgin Islands	Saint Thomas	Cyril E. King Airport		
United States	Utah	Salt Lake City	Salt Lake City International Airport		
United States	Vermont	Burlington	Burlington International Airport		
United States	Virginia	Newport News/Williamsburg	Newport News/Williamsburg International Airport	Terminated	
United States	Virginia	Norfolk	Norfolk International Airport		
United States	Virginia	Richmond	Richmond International Airport		
United States	Washington	Everett	Paine Field	Terminated	
United States	Washington	Seattle/Tacoma	Seattle–Tacoma International Airport		
United States	Washington	Spokane	Spokane International Airport		
United States	Wisconsin	Madison	Dane County Regional Airport		
United States	Wisconsin	Milwaukee	Milwaukee Mitchell International Airport		
United States	Wyoming	Jackson Hole	Jackson Hole Airport		
Uruguay		Montevideo	Carrasco International Airport	Terminated	
Venezuela	Capital District	Caracas	Simón Bolívar International Airport	Terminated	
Vietnam		Ho Chi Minh City	Tan Son Nhat International Airport		

=== Hubs ===
As of 2026, United operates eight hubs:

- Chicago–O'Hare
- Denver
- Guam
- Houston–Intercontinental
- Los Angeles
- Newark
- San Francisco
- Washington–Dulles

=== United Express ===
United Express is a regional airline network that supports United Airlines operations, primarily by serving smaller cities and connecting traffic to United's main hubs. Representing six percent of United's total capacity for 2024, United Express operates through partnerships with regional carriers, including CommuteAir, GoJet Airlines, Mesa Airlines, Republic Airways, and SkyWest Airlines. These carriers operate under capacity purchase agreements, wherein United contracts for flight services, pays fixed and performance-based fees, and covers additional costs, like fuel and landing fees. The regional carriers operate United-branded flights following schedules set by the airline, while United manages pricing, revenue, and loyalty programs for passengers.

=== Alliance and codeshare agreements ===
United Airlines is a member of Star Alliance that has 26 member airlines that operate a combined fleet of over 5,000 aircraft, with more than 19,000 flights, serving more than 1,150 airports with access to over 1,000 lounges in 190 countries.

United has codeshare agreements with the following airlines:

- Aegean Airlines
- Aer Lingus
- Air Canada
- Air China
- Air Dolomiti
- Air India
- Air Link
- Air New Zealand
- All Nippon Airways
- Asiana Airlines
- Austrian Airlines
- Avianca
- Azul Brazilian Airlines
- Brussels Airlines
- Cape Air
- Copa Airlines
- Croatia Airlines
- Discover Airlines
- Edelweiss Air
- Egyptair
- Emirates
- Ethiopian Airlines
- Eurowings
- EVA Air
- Flydubai
- Hawaiian Airlines
- ITA Airways
- JSX
- Juneyao Air
- Lufthansa
- Lufthansa City Airlines
- Olympic Air
- Shenzhen Airlines
- Singapore Airlines
- South African Airways
- Swiss International Air Lines
- TAP Air Portugal
- Thai Airways International
- Turkish Airlines
- Virgin Australia

== Fleet ==
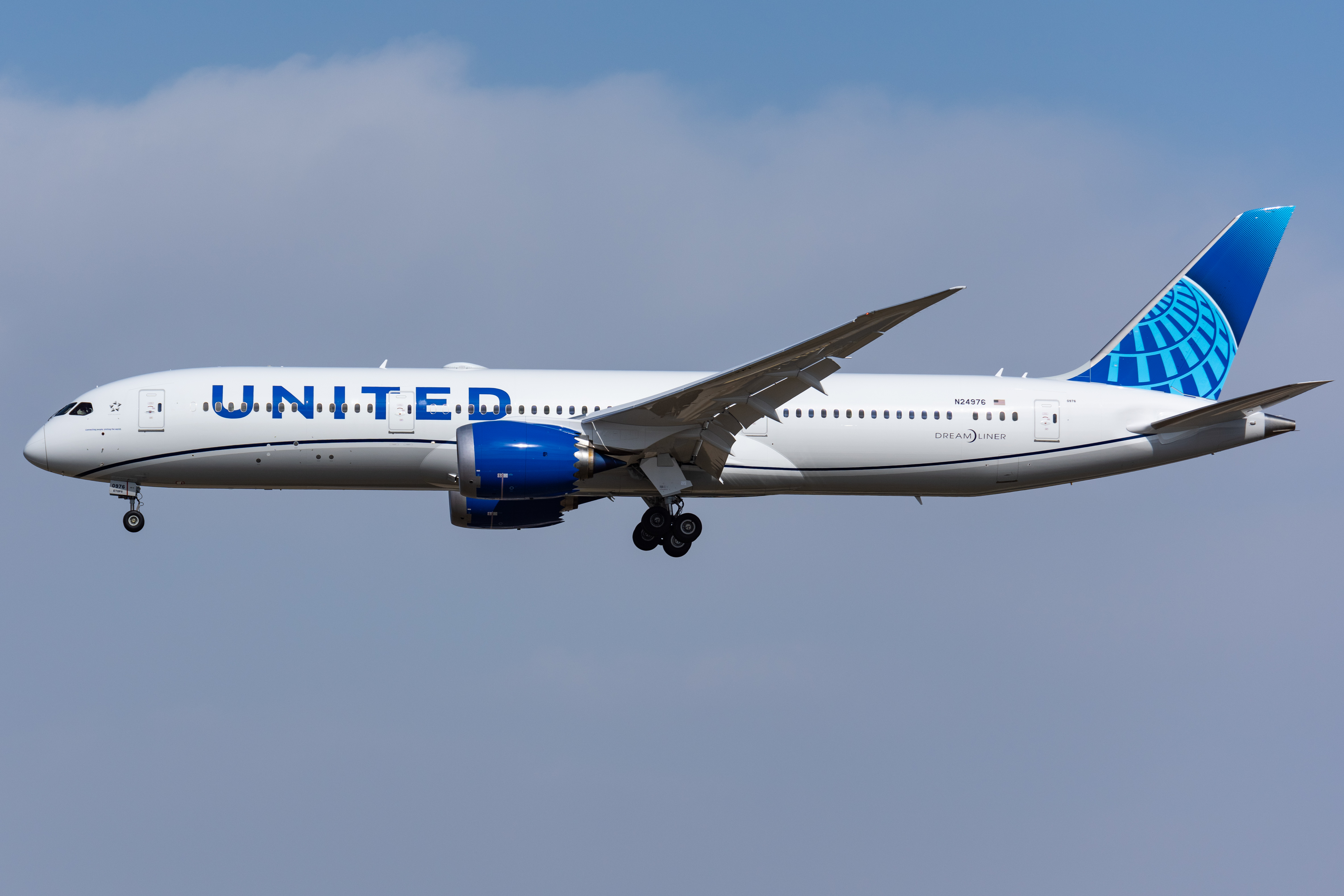
United Airlines Boeing 787-9 in the most recent livery in 2020

As of November 2026, the United Airlines fleet consists of 1,152 mainline aircraft, the largest of any airline worldwide. United Airlines operates a mix of narrow-body aircraft from Airbus and Boeing and an all Boeing wide-body fleet, with more wide-bodies than any other North American passenger airline. The average age of United's fleet is 14.7 years.

=== Strategy ===
The "United Next" strategy introduced during the COVID-19 pandemic is United Airlines' plan to modernize and expand its fleet while enhancing operational efficiency and the passenger experience. Unlike other major U.S. airlines, United retained its wide-body aircraft during the pandemic, allowing the airline to meet the surge in travel demand, especially internationally as recovery progressed.

Since 2021, United has placed orders for over 500 various narrow-body jets and 150 wide-body Boeing 787 Dreamliner jets as part of its strategy, which also includes retiring older mainline aircraft and at least 200 single-class regional jets.

The strategy emphasizes improving the passenger experience. United's "Signature Interior" concept features seatback entertainment systems with Bluetooth connectivity, power outlets at every seat, and larger overhead bins designed to accommodate a roller bag for each passenger. All new aircraft will include the updated interior, with retrofitting of existing mainline aircraft. United has also selected SpaceX's Starlink as its in-flight internet connectivity provider for mainline and two-class regional aircraft. This high-speed, low-latency satellite internet service will enable live streaming, cloud-based work applications, and gaming with complimentary access provided to all passengers.

== Cabins ==
=== United Polaris ===
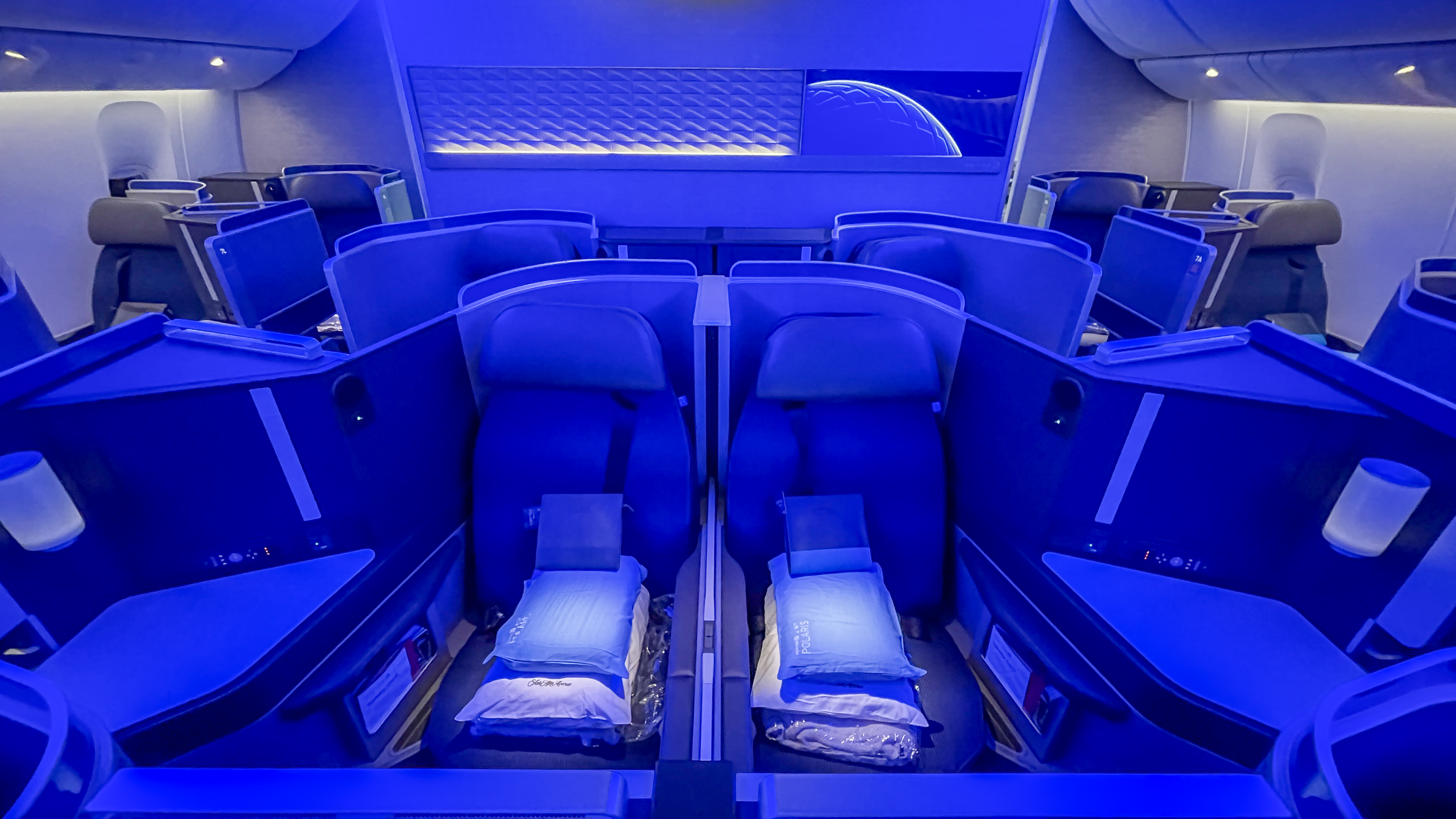
United Polaris business class on a Boeing 777

United Polaris is the airline's international business class product. The seats convert into a 6-foot-6-inch (1.98 m) flatbed and include personal storage areas, power outlets and upgraded dining and amenity offerings.

Polaris seats are available on all Boeing 767s and 787s, internationally configured 757s and 777s, and Airbus A321XLRs. Boeing 757s use a 2–2 layout without direct aisle access from each seat, while widebody aircraft and Airbus A321XLRs provide aisle access for all passengers.

United has introduced an updated Polaris suite for newer Boeing 787s and Airbus A321XLRs. These suites include sliding doors and larger 4K screens. On the 787s, the bulkhead row of each Polaris cabin is designated as "Polaris Studio" seats with additional space and features.

Polaris passengers receive priority check-in and boarding along with access to United Polaris lounges or partner lounges.

=== United First and United Business ===
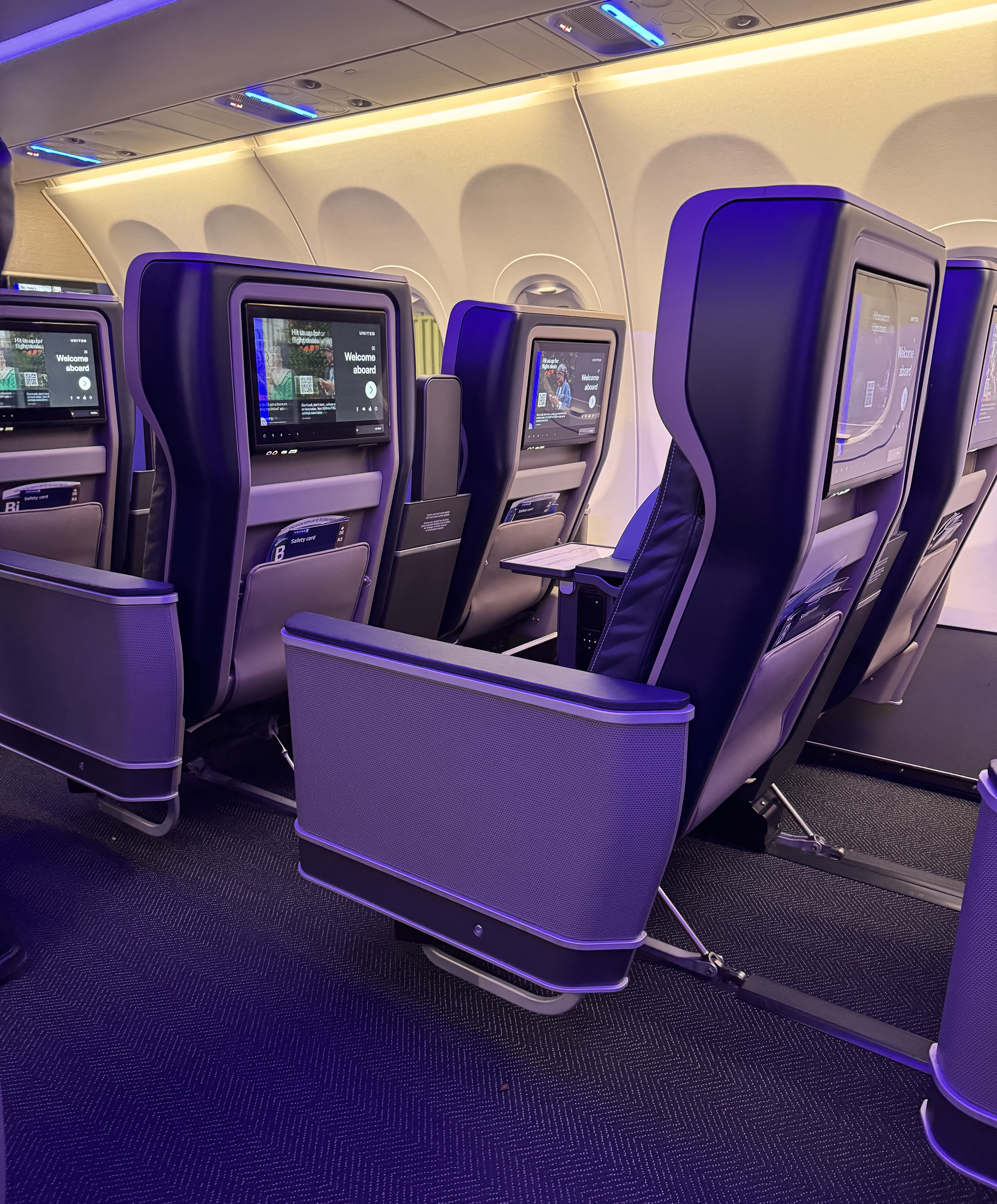
United First on an Airbus A321neo

United First is the highest cabin offered on domestically configured aircraft. When these aircraft operate internationally, the cabin is marketed as United Business. Seats on narrowbody aircraft have a 38-inch (970 mm) seat pitch, while domestically configured Boeing 777-200ERs feature fully flat seats in a staggered layout. Amenities include priority services, complimentary alcoholic beverages and meals on longer flights, and dedicated check-in areas.

United introduced a redesigned domestic first-class seat in 2015, initially on Airbus A320 family aircraft, subsequently rolling it out across the mainline fleet.

In 2019, United announced a fleet-wide increase in first and business class seating, including the introduction of the premium-configured CRJ550 and later the CRJ450 regional aircraft.

United's newest narrowbody interiors debuted on the Airbus A321neo in 2023.

=== United Premium Plus ===
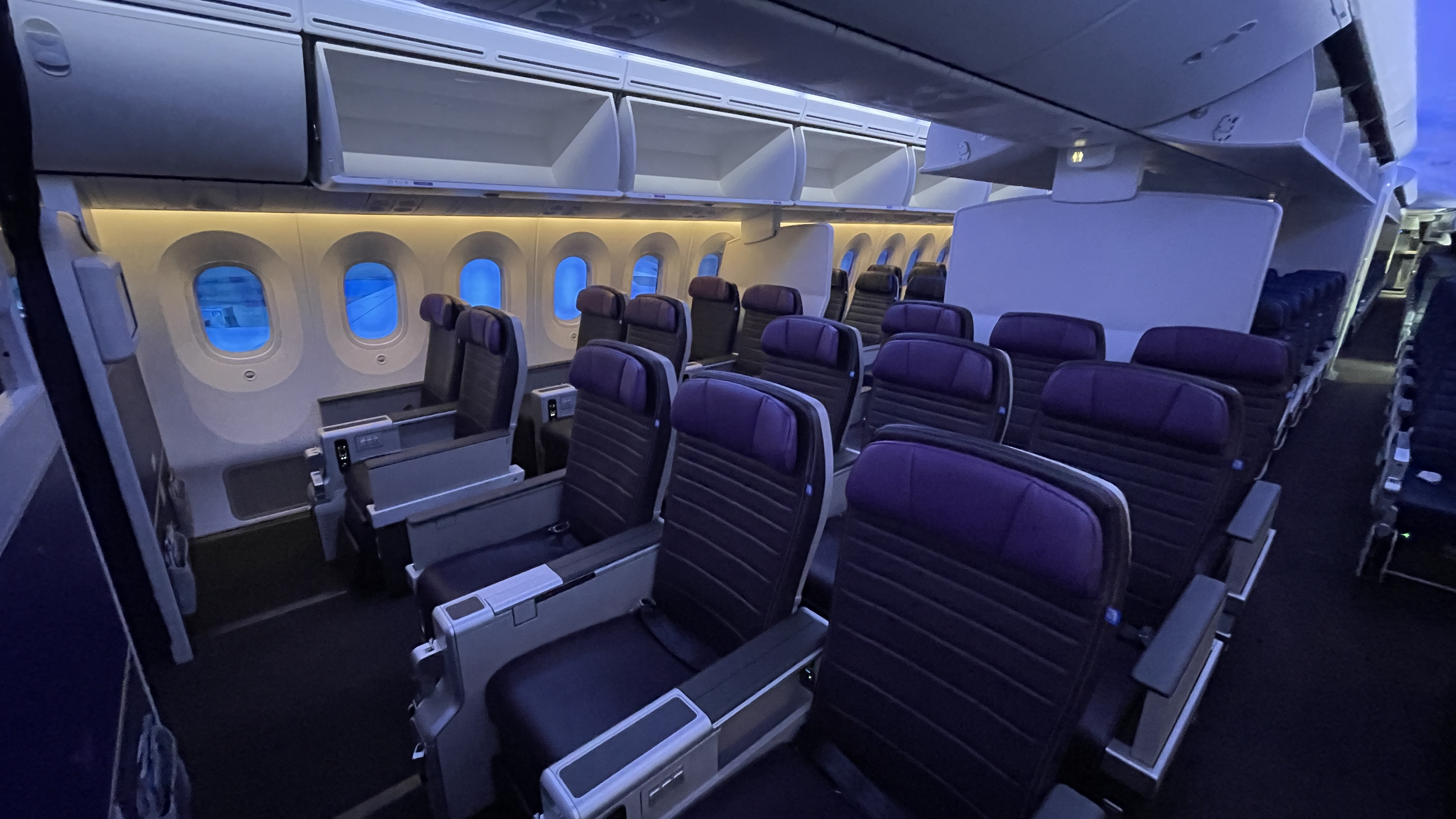
United Premium Plus on a Boeing 787

United Premium Plus is the airline's international premium economy class cabin. It is available on all internationally configured widebody aircraft and Airbus A321XLRs, featuring recliner seats with increased width, legroom and footrests. On newer Boeing 787s and A321XLRs, the seats also feature privacy dividers. Typical layouts are 2–2–2 on Boeing 767s, 2–3–2 on 787s, 2–4–2 on 777s, and 2-2 on A321XLRs.

Premium Plus includes enhanced dining, complimentary alcoholic beverages and upgraded bedding and amenities. The product entered service in 2019 after initially being sold as extended-legroom seating during the rollout period.

=== Economy Plus ===
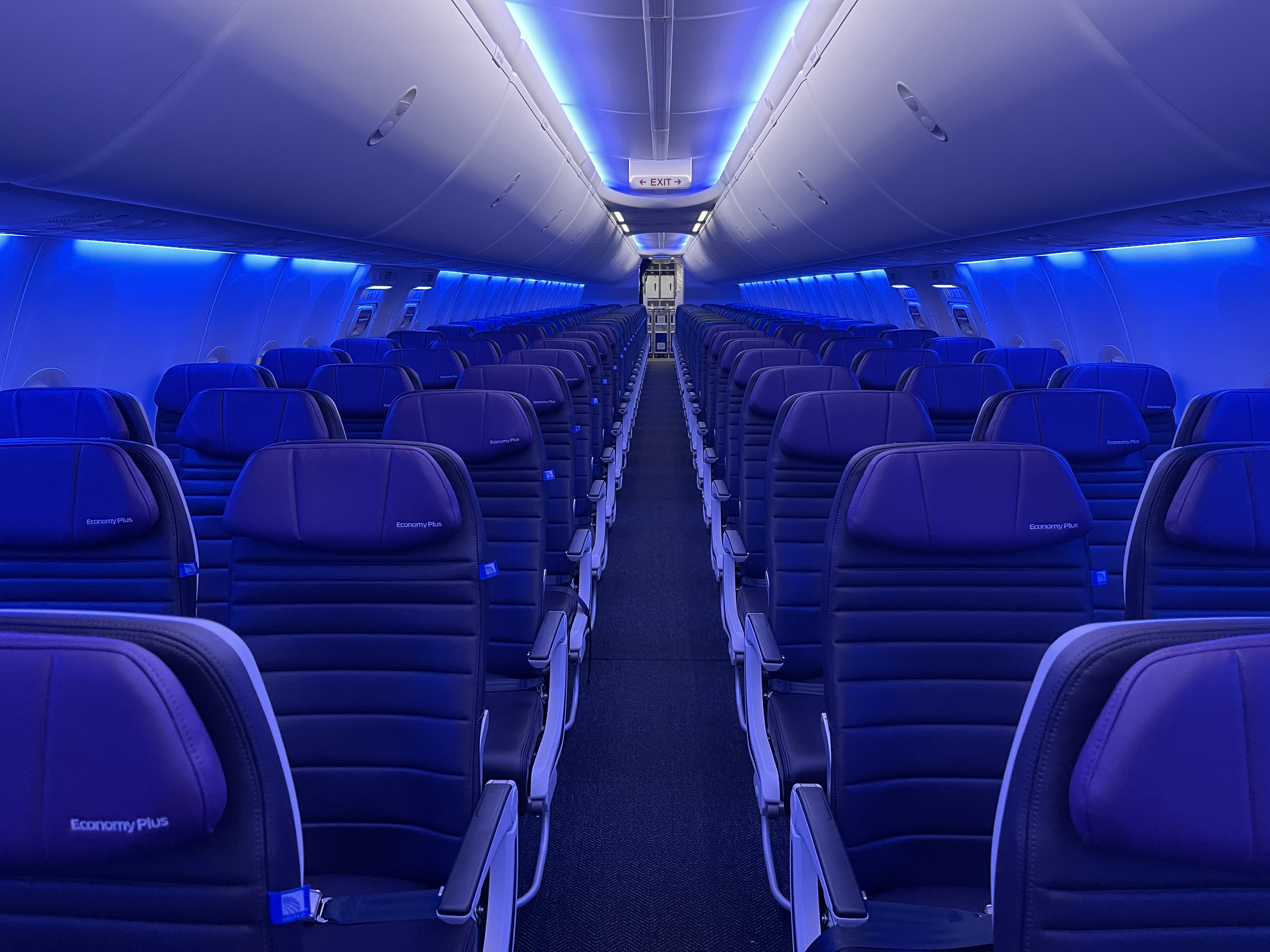
Economy Plus on a 737 MAX

Economy Plus seats are located in the forward section of the economy cabin and in exit rows. They offer 5 to 6 inches (130 to 150 mm) of additional pitch and extra recline compared to standard economy seats. All other in-flight amenities are the same as United Economy.

Economy Plus is complimentary for MileagePlus Premier members, with eligibility depending on status tier.

=== United Economy ===
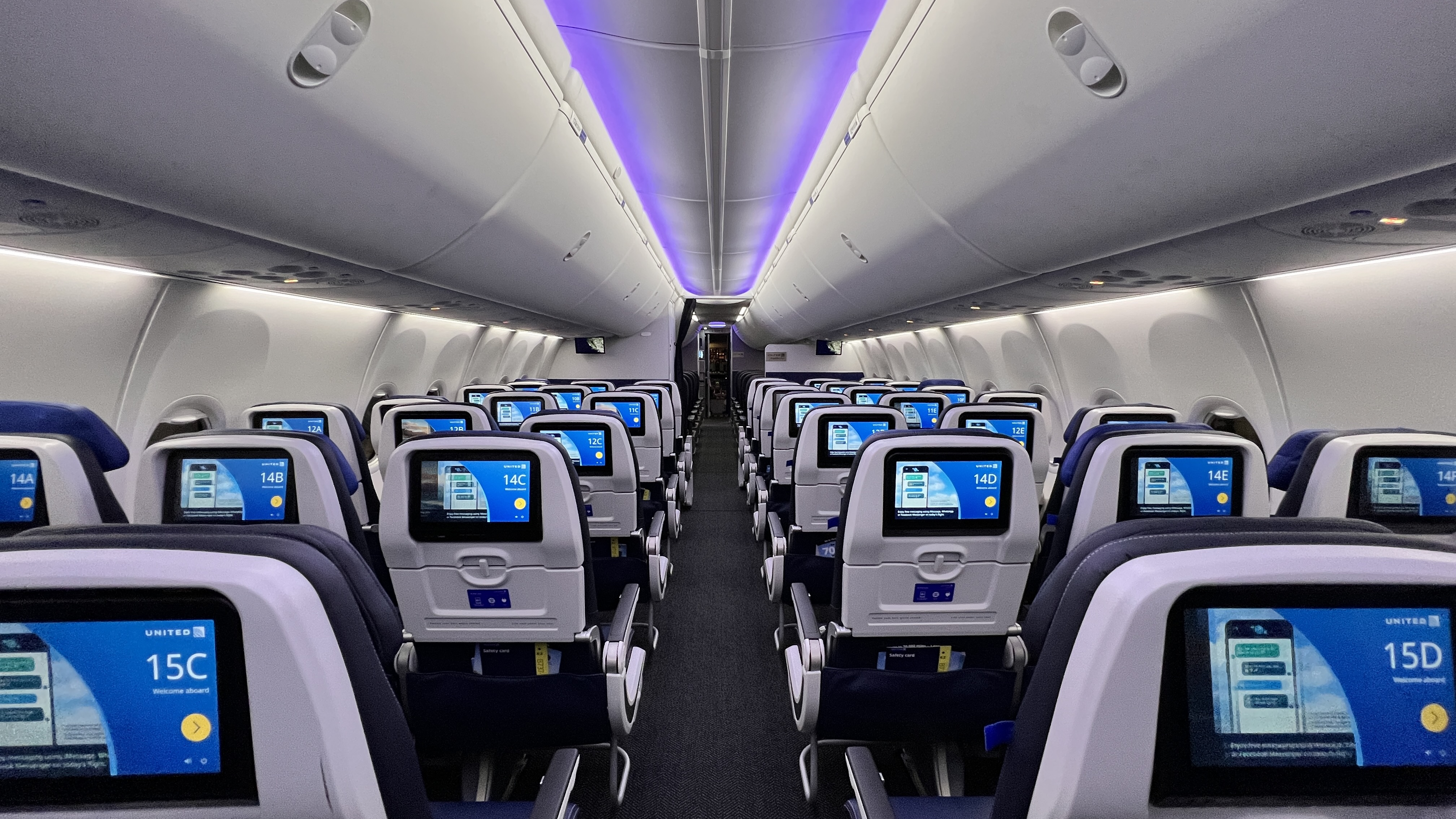
United Economy on a Boeing 737 MAX

United Economy is offered on all aircraft, with a typical 31-inch (790 mm) seat pitch and 2 to 5 inches (51 to 127 mm) of recline. Many aircraft include personal seat-back entertainment systems, while others offer streaming media through onboard Wi-Fi. Some Boeing 737 aircraft are also equipped with DirecTV. Under the United NEXT initiative, all mainline aircraft are planned to have personal touchscreens by 2025.

Food and beverage service varies by route. Domestic and short-haul international flights offer buy-on-board options, while long-haul international flights include complimentary meals. All flights offer free snacks and non-alcoholic beverages, with complimentary beer and wine on long-haul international routes.

=== Basic Economy ===
Basic Economy is United's lowest fare type. Passengers receive the same onboard service as standard economy but face restrictions including no advance seat assignment, limited carry-on allowances and reduced eligibility for MileagePlus and Premier benefits.

== Reward programs ==
=== Frequent flyer programs ===
MileagePlus is the frequent flyer program for United Airlines. Published MileagePlus Premier tiers are Premier Silver, Premier Gold, Premier Platinum, and Premier 1K. Unpublished tiers include United Global Services and Chairman's Circle.

As United is a Star Alliance member, customers reaching certain qualifications are entitled to certain benefits which may be used across the entirety of the Star Alliance network. Premier Silver customers are given Star Alliance Silver status, while Premier Gold customers and higher are given Star Alliance Gold status.

=== Airport lounges ===
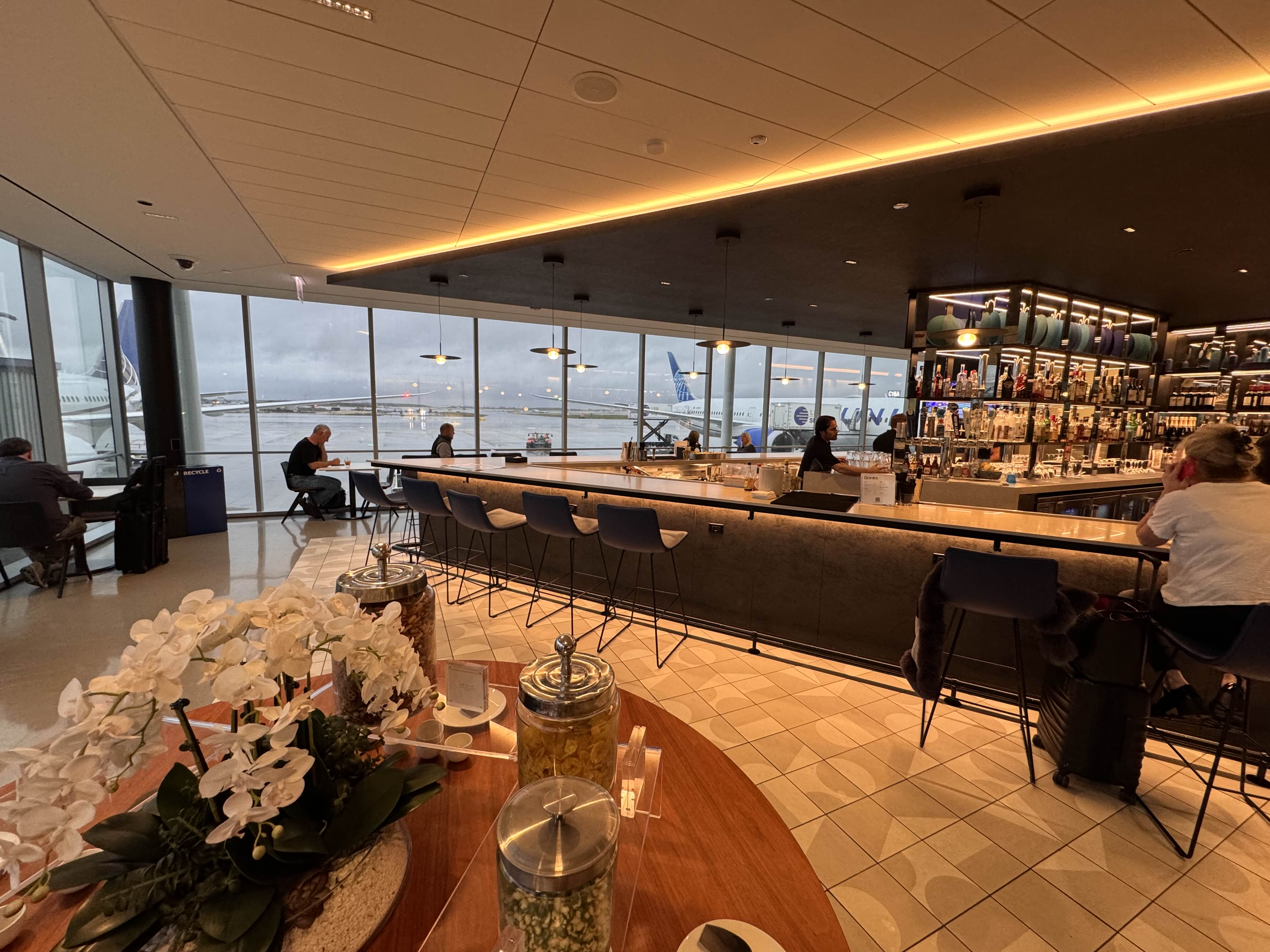
United Club at Chicago–O'Hare

United Club is the airline lounge associated with United Airlines and United Express carriers. The United Club replaced the former United Red Carpet Club and Continental Airlines Presidents Club prior to United Airlines' merger with Continental.

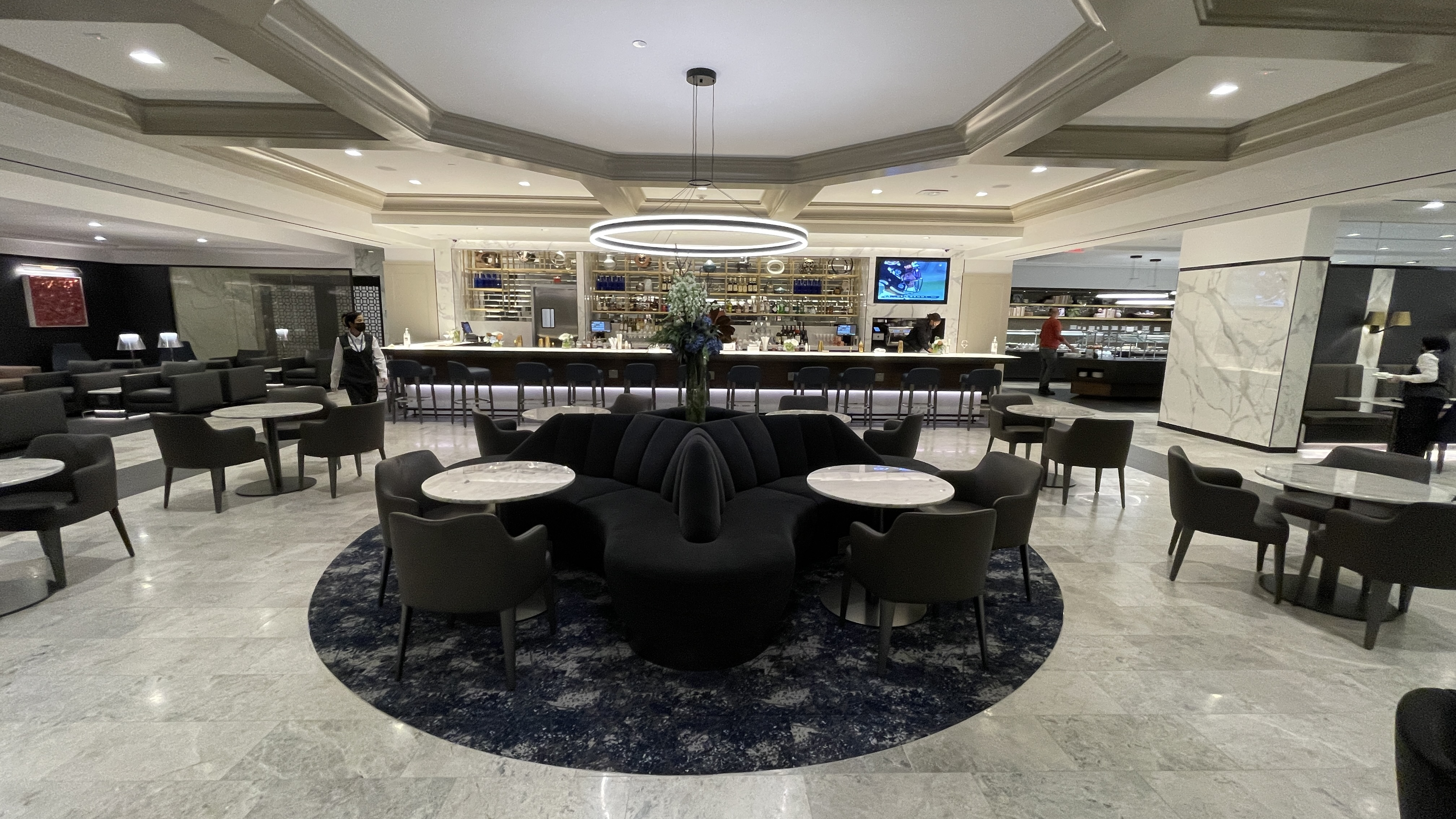
Polaris lounge at Washington–Dulles

Polaris lounges are lounges available exclusively to long-haul travelers in United's Polaris business class cabin, as well as passengers in first and business class on Star Alliance carriers. Amenities include à la carte dining, shower facilities, and sleeping pods.

== Corporate affairs ==
=== Ownership and structure ===
United Airlines, Inc. is a publicly traded company under its parent holding company, United Airlines Holdings, Inc., a Delaware corporation listed on Nasdaq under the ticker symbol UAL. As of January 2025, it has a market capitalization exceeding $35 billion. United's operating revenues and operating expenses account for nearly 100% of the holding company's revenues and operating expenses. United's operating revenues and expenses account for nearly all of the holding company's financial activity.

Headquartered in the Willis Tower in Chicago, United ranked No. 83 on the 2025 Fortune 500 list of the largest U.S. corporations by total revenue. Through United Airlines Holdings, the company also holds a 9.9% stake in Mesa Airlines, a regional carrier operating under the United Express brand.

=== Business trends ===
The key trends for United Airlines are (as of the end of the calendar year):

Year	Revenue (in billion US$)	Net income (in billion US$)	Employees (FTE)	Passengers (in millions)	Load factor (%)	Aircraft	Ref
2011	37.1	0.8	87,000	96	82.8	701	
2012	37.1	(0.7)	88,000	94	82.9	702	
2013	38.2	0.6	87,000	91	83.8	693	
2014	38.9	1.1	84,000	138	83.6	691	
2015	37.8	7.3	84,000	140	83.4	715	
2016	36.5	2.2	88,000	143	82.9	737	
2017	37.7	2.1	89,800	148	82.4	744	
2018	41.3	2.1	92,000	158	83.6	770	
2019	43.2	3.0	96,000	162	84.0	777	
2020	15.3	(7.0)	74,400	58	60.2	812	
2021	24.6	(1.9)	84,100	104	72.2	826	
2022	44.9	0.7	92,800	144	83.4	868	
2023	53.7	2.6	103,300	165	83.9	945	
2024	57.0	3.1	107,300	174	83.1	994	
2025	59.0	3.3	113,200	181	82.2	1,066	

=== Headquarters and other facilities ===
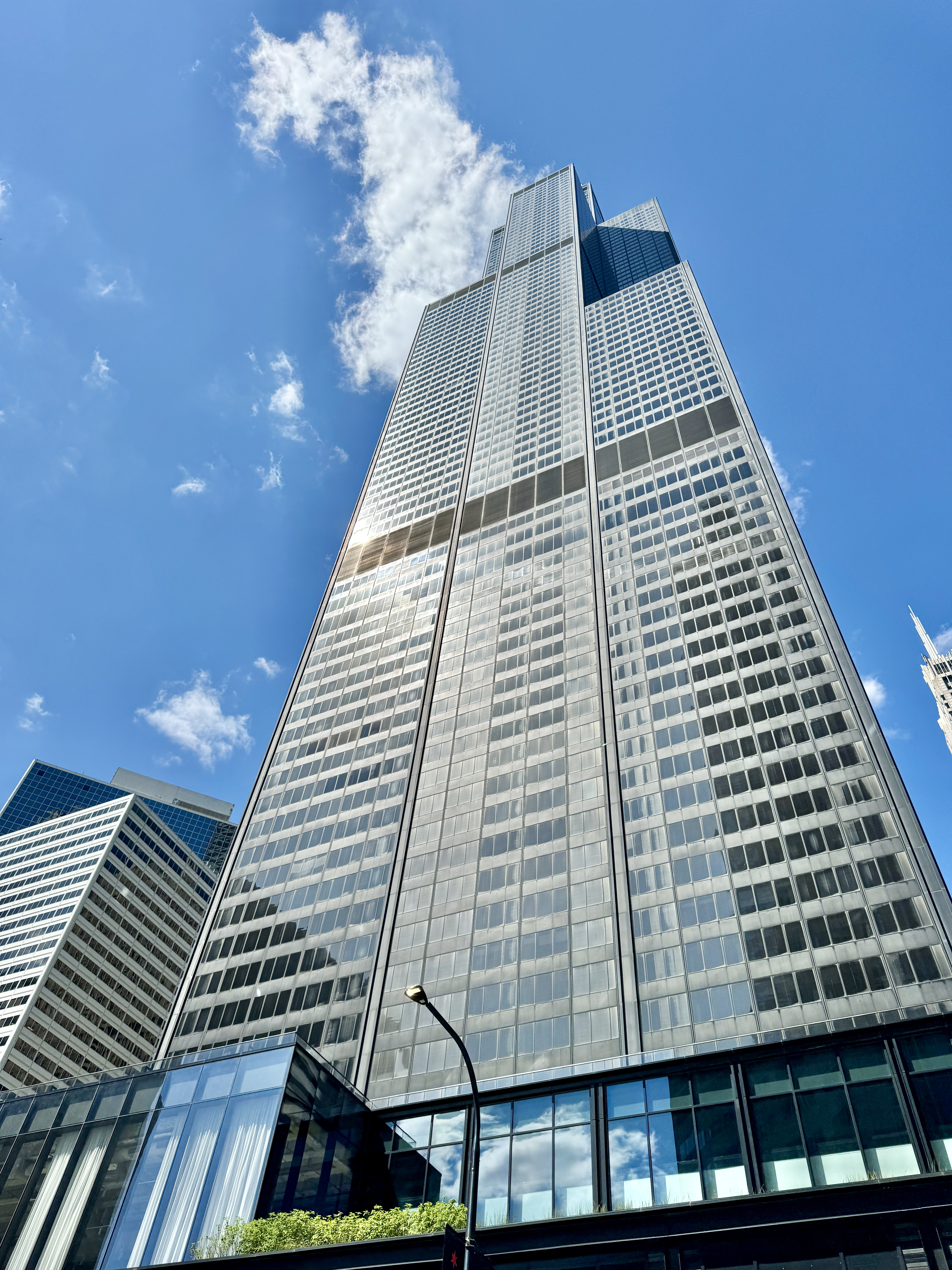
United Airlines Holdings World Headquarters, Willis Tower

The headquarters of United Airlines is located in the Willis Tower (formerly the Sears Tower) in Chicago, the building's largest tenant.

In 2007, United moved approximately 350 executives and administrative staff from its Elk Grove campus, in suburban Chicago, to a new headquarters at 77 West Wacker Drive (which was renamed the United Building) in downtown Chicago. The relocation was completed in 2007 after the airline received $5.5 million in city incentives. Following its 2010 merger with Continental Airlines, United announced plans to consolidate its corporate offices in downtown Chicago. The company accepted a $35 million incentive package from the City of Chicago to relocate approximately 2,500 remaining suburban employees to the Willis Tower. United had initially leased approximately 470,000 sq ft (44,000 m^{2}) across 12 floors of the building in 2010 to establish its operations center. On August 13, 2012, the airline announced it would relocate its headquarters from 77 West Wacker to Willis Tower, leasing an additional 200,000 sq ft (19,000 m^{2}) and occupying a total of 20 floors. In 2019, United renewed its lease at Willis Tower through 2033.

The former Elk Grove campus was gradually annexed into Mount Prospect. While most corporate functions were relocated to Chicago, the site continued to house information technology operations, including a 172,000 sq ft (16,000 m^{2}) data center completed in 2013. As of 2021, approximately 100 employees remained at the Mount Prospect facility to operate the data center. In December 2021, the remaining campus buildings were sold to CloudHQ, which subsequently redeveloped portions of the site into data center facilities.

United also maintains a significant corporate presence in downtown Houston, leasing 225,000 sq ft (20,900 m^{2}) of office space in the 609 Main at Texas tower since 2017. At the time of the lease, the airline had approximately 1,600 employees based in Houston. United's Houston operations largely reflect its 2010 merger with Houston-based Continental Airlines.

=== Corporate identity ===
==== Brand image ====
The pre-merger United logo, commonly nicknamed the "tulip", was developed in the early 1970s by the designer Saul Bass as part of a new brand image. The logo represented the airline's monogram as well as a modernized version of the airline's shield logo which had been adopted in the 1930s, but fell out of use by the late 1960s. The ribbon-like rendering has also been said to symbolize the motion of flight. In 2010, United announced they would be merging with Continental Airlines and as a result, the combined airline would keep the United name but discontinue using the tulip logo and use the Continental Airlines "globe" identity and livery instead, designed in 1991 by the Lippincott company.

In 2019 United ran Her Art Here, a competition inviting female artists based in the United States to design aircraft liveries. Two winning designs, representing New York and New Jersey and California, were applied to Boeing 757-200s; both aircraft were returned to the standard livery in early 2025.

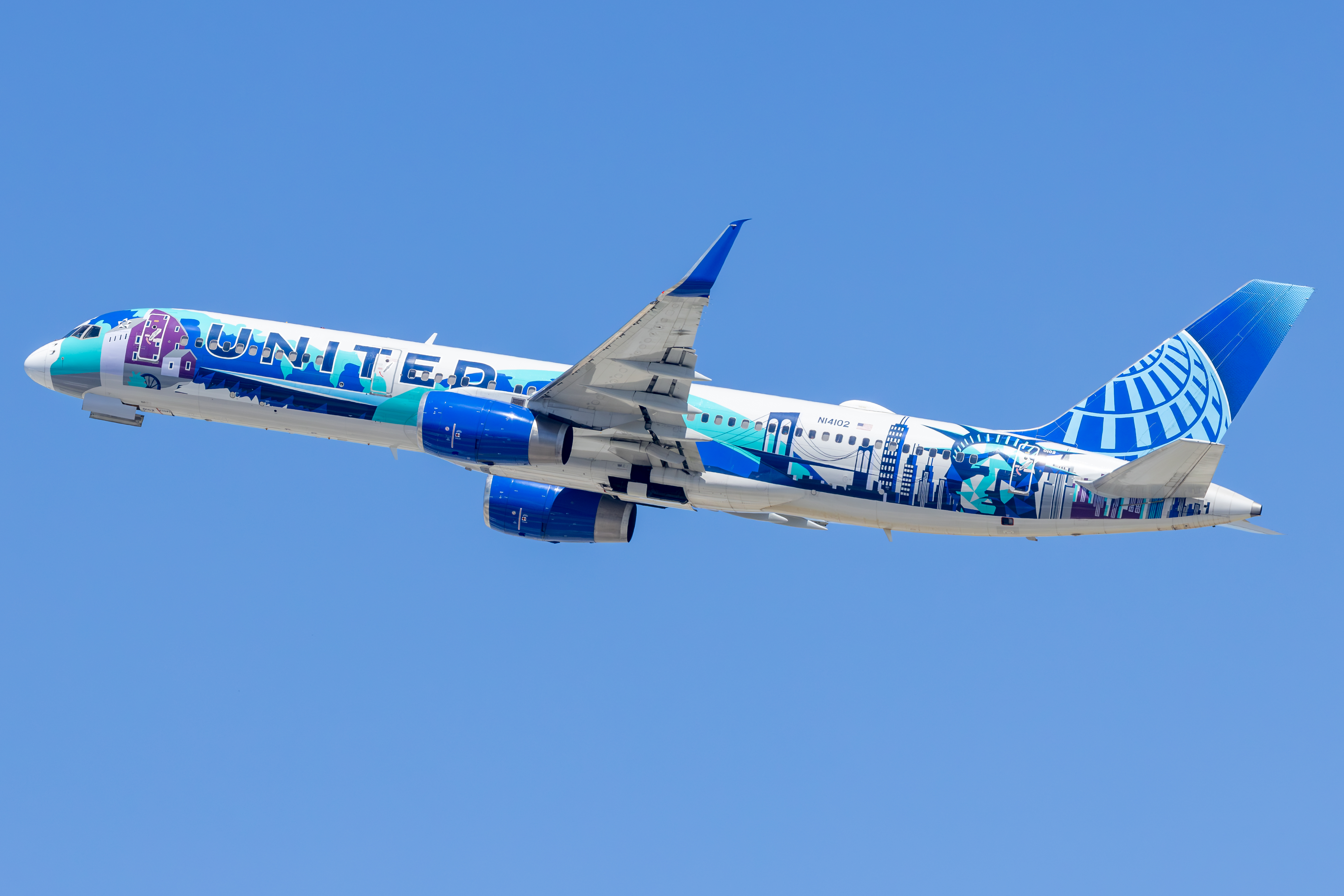
A United Boeing 757-200 in the Her Art Here livery for New York and New Jersey, photographed in 2023 and repainted in 2025

==== Marketing themes ====
United's earliest slogan, "The Main Line Airway", emphasized its signature New York-Chicago-San Francisco route, and was replaced in 1965 with "Fly the Friendly Skies", which was in use until 1996 in its first iteration. The "It's time to fly" slogan was created in 2004. After the merger of United and Continental in October 2010, the slogan changed to "Let's fly together" until September 2013, when United announced a return of the "Fly the Friendly Skies" slogan in an ad campaign to start the following day. The resurrected slogan would be accompanied by the 1924 George Gershwin song "Rhapsody in Blue" as its theme song, and a voiceover provided by Matt Damon.

United had licensed its theme song, "Rhapsody in Blue", from Gershwin's estate for US$500,000 (equivalent to $2,828,947 in 2025) in 1976. "Rhapsody" would have entered the public domain in 2000, but the Copyright Term Extension Act of 1998 extended its copyright another 20 years until January 1, 2020, when it officially entered the public domain. United announced that it would continue to use "Rhapsody in Blue" as its theme song following the merger with Continental.

=== Environmental initiatives ===
Because over 98 percent of United's greenhouse gas emissions are from jet fuel, its environmental strategy has focused on operational fuel efficiency initiatives and investments in sustainably produced, low-carbon alternative fuels.

On August 23, 2011, United announced a conversion to paperless flight decks with 11,000 iPads for its pilots. Each iPad, which weighs less than 1.5 pounds (0.68 kg), will replace approximately 38 pounds (17 kg) of paper operating manuals, navigation charts, reference handbooks, flight checklists, logbooks, and weather information. The green benefits include reductions in paper use, printing, and fuel consumption. This shift not only streamlines the flight process but also significantly enhances operational efficiency and safety by ensuring pilots have the most up-to-date information readily available.

On November 7, 2011, United flew the world's first commercial aviation flight on a microbially derived biofuel. The aircraft was fueled with 40 percent Solajet, which is Solazyme's algae-derived renewable jet fuel, and 60 percent petroleum-derived jet fuel. This flight was operated by the Eco-Skies Boeing 737-800 aircraft from IAH to ORD.

On January 15, 2013, Aviation Partners Boeing (APB), a joint venture between Aviation Partners Inc. and Boeing, announced that United had agreed to replace the Blended Winglets on its Boeing 737NG aircraft with APB's Split Scimitar Winglet (SSW), significantly reducing drag. Once the SSWs are installed, it is estimated that APB's winglet technology will save United more than $250 million annually in fuel costs.

On June 30, 2015, United invested $30 million in Fulcrum BioEnergy, an alternative fuel company. Fulcrum's alternative fuel is produced through a clean and efficient thermochemical process and reduces lifecycle carbon emissions by more than 80 percent. As part of its investment, United will work with Fulcrum to develop up to five alternative fuel refineries near its U.S. hubs. These refineries will produce up to 180 million U.S. gallons (680 million liters) of sustainable aviation alternative fuel per year, and United will have the opportunity to purchase at least 90 million U.S. gallons (340 million liters) per year for a minimum of 10 years, making it the largest aviation alternative fuel commitment to date.

On March 11, 2016, United became the first airline in the world to fly on commercial-scale quantities of such fuels on a continuous basis, which were procured from AltAir Fuels. This fuel was produced from sustainable feedstocks such as non-edible natural oils and agricultural wastes and is expected to provide a greater than 60 percent reduction in carbon dioxide emissions on a lifecycle basis when compared to traditional jet fuel. United has agreed to purchase up to 15 million U.S. gallons (57 million liters) of sustainable alternative fuel from AltAir Fuels for use in Los Angeles over a three-year period.

In 2016, United began partnering with Clean the World to repurpose items from the airline's international premium class amenity kits and donate the hygiene products to those in critical need. Clean the World provides hygiene education and soap to promote handwashing, which helps prevent hygiene-related deaths. During the first year of this partnership, United expected to divert 60,000 pounds (27,200 kg) of material that otherwise would have gone to landfills.

In 2017, United started a partnership with Audubon International to protect raptors—including hawks, ospreys and owls—in and around New York-area airports and resettle the birds-of-prey at suitable golf course habitats where the species are more likely to thrive.

In 2022, United expanded its use of sustainable aviation fuel (SAF) overseas, to Amsterdam's Schiphol Airport. It was the first US airline to purchase sustainable jet fuel overseas. United began the use of sustainable fuel at San Francisco International Airport and London Heathrow in 2023, and at Chicago O'Hare and Los Angeles International Airport in 2024.

=== Employee relations ===
United Airlines was the first airline to see a successful unionization of flight attendants when the Association of Flight Attendants-CWA (AFA) was founded in 1945 by five United Airlines flight attendants. The AFA has represented flight attendants from United Airlines since.

United Airlines maintenance technicians are represented by the International Brotherhood of Teamsters. Their contract became amendable on December 5, 2024.

The International Association of Machinists and Aerospace Workers (IAM) District 141 represents approximately 34,000 Fleet Service, Passenger Service, Reservations, Stockroom, Central Load Planner, Maintenance Instructor, Fleet Technical Instructor, Emergency Procedures Instructor and Security Officer workers. Their contract became amendable on May 1, 2025.

With over 18,000 members, the United Airlines pilots are the largest pilot group in the world and represented by the Air Line Pilots Association (ALPA). ALPA was founded by United Air Lines Captain David L. Behncke and 23 other key figures in Chicago, Illinois, on July 27, 1931. In the 1930s, flying was a perilous occupation; thus, from the time of its formation to today, one of ALPA's main goals has been to improve air safety. The United pilots' current contract will become amendable on September 30, 2027.

=== United Aviate Academy ===
United Aviate Academy is a flight training school owned and operated by United Airlines, located at Phoenix Goodyear Airport in Goodyear, Arizona. It opened in 2022 as the primary training facility for the United Aviate pilot development program.

Students train under Federal Aviation Administration Part 141 standards, progressing through private, instrument, and commercial pilot certificates. Graduates may transition into the broader Aviate pathway toward employment as United first officers. The academy was established in part to address projected pilot shortages and to expand access to pilot careers.

== Accidents and incidents ==
United Airlines has been involved in numerous accidents and incidents since its founding, including Flight 175 and Flight 93 as part of the September 11 attacks, in which roughly 1000 were killed. The deadliest non-terrorism accident was in 1989, when Flight 232 crash-landed at Sioux Gateway Airport, following an uncontained engine failure leading to total loss of flight controls. 112 of the 296 on board were killed.

== Controversies and passenger incidents ==
=== 2017 passenger removal ===
On the evening of April 9, 2017, a passenger was forcibly removed by law enforcement from United Airlines flight 3411 at Chicago-O'Hare, bound for Louisville. United announced that it needed four seats for airline staff on the sold-out flight. When no passengers volunteered after being offered vouchers worth $800, United staff selected four passengers to leave. Three of them did so, but the fourth, a doctor named David Dao, declined as he said that he had patients to treat the following morning. He was pulled from his seat by Chicago Department of Aviation security officers and dragged by his arms down the aisle after his head was hit against an armrest and he was rendered unconscious. Dao sustained a concussion, broken teeth and a broken nose among other injuries. The incident was captured on smartphone cameras and posted on social media, triggering angry public backlash. Afterwards, United's then-chief executive officer, Oscar Munoz, described Dao as "disruptive and belligerent", apologized for "re-accommodating" the paying customers, and defended and praised staff for "following established procedures". He was widely criticized as "tone-deaf". Munoz later issued a second statement calling what happened a "truly horrific event" and accepting "full responsibility" for it. After a lawsuit, Dao reached an undisclosed settlement with United and airport police. In the aftermath, United's board of directors decided that Munoz would not become its chairman and that executive compensation would be tied to customer satisfaction. Following this incident, passenger complaints increased by 70 percent.

=== Mail-scan fraud ===
In February 2021, United Airlines was fined $49 million by the United States Department of Justice on charges of fraud on postal service contracts for transportation of international mail. According to investigators, between 2012 and 2015 United submitted delivery scan data to make it appear that United and its partner airlines complied with International Commercial Air requirements with accurate delivery times when in fact they were automated delivery scans with aspirational delivery times. Some employees within United worked to hide this fact from the United States Postal Service.

== See also ==
- Air transport in the United States
- Transportation in the United States
- List of airlines of the United States
- List of airports in the United States
- Hemispheres – United's former inflight magazine
- Island Hopper – United route between Guam and Honolulu via several small islands in Micronesia and the Marshall Islands
