= Osijek Airport =

Osijek Airport Zračna luka Osijek
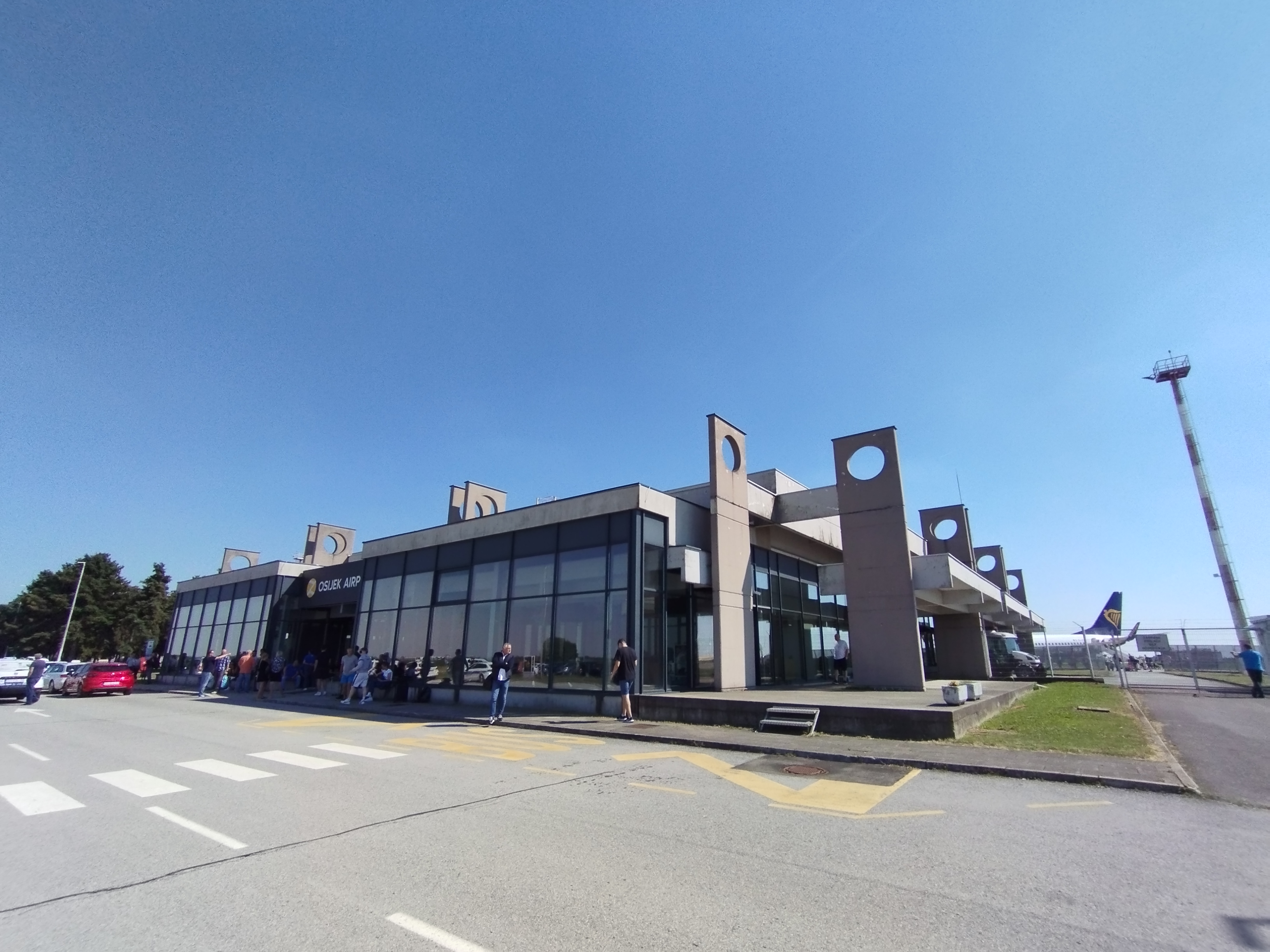
- IATA: OSI; ICAO: LDOS

Summary
- Airport type: Public
- Operator: Osijek Airport Ltd.
- Serves: Osijek, Vukovar
- Location: Klisa, Croatia
- Elevation AMSL: 291 ft (89 m)
- Coordinates: 45°27′46″N 018°48′37″E
- Website: osijek-airport.hr

Map
- Location of the airport in Croatia

Runways
Direction	Length		Surface
Direction	m	ft	Surface
11/29	2,500	8,202	Asphalt

Statistics (2022)
- Passengers: 15,875 ▲37,86%
- Croatian Aeronautical Information Publication

Osijek Airport (Croatian: Zračna luka Osijek; IATA: OSI, ICAO: LDOS), commonly referred to as Klisa is the international airport of Osijek, Croatia. It is located 20 km east southeast of Osijek and near the D2 state road, southwest of the village of Klisa. The airport is halfway between Osijek and Vukovar in the Vukovar-Srijem County.

== Facilities ==
The terminal building, with an area of 1300 m^{2}, provides flow from 200 to 400 passengers per hour, i.e., 100,000 to 150,000 passengers per year. As an additional passenger service, there is the possibility for contracting individual charter flights. The passenger terminal is equipped to handle domestic and international traffic; it features passport and custom controls, passenger and baggage check-in, exchange, information, a café-bar and restaurant as well as rent a car, taxi and car parking services.

== Airport terminal expansion ==
The investment in Osijek Airport is currently one of the largest transport infrastructure projects in the region. New international routes from Osijek are being actively considered, with the City of Osijek, Osijek-Baranja County and the ministry working on introducing additional destinations. The first phase of the project, which covered the external works, has been completed. This included a renovated façade, external landscaping and the construction of a new canopy in front of the terminal to improve passenger access and protection. The second phase is now underway and involves the reconstruction and expansion of the passenger terminal, increasing its total area to approximately 2,800 m^{2} (30,000 sq ft). The expansion aims to bring the terminal in line with new European Union Entry/Exit System (EES) requirements — a new EU-wide digital border management system that replaces manual passport stamping at external Schengen borders with automated biometric checks.

The number of check-in counters will double from three to six, and a high-capacity baggage screening system will be introduced to streamline passenger flow.The upgraded terminal will include new passenger processing technology, modernized check-in and security control areas, improved baggage handling systems, and more energy-efficient infrastructure. The commercial area will also be expanded, featuring two cafés (each around 80 m^{2} (860 sq ft), retail shops, and an outdoor terrace area for passengers. Air traffic has not been suspended and continues to operate throughout the reconstruction, with passenger operations temporarily taking place in the administrative building. The winter flight schedule remains in effect until 28 March 2026, when the summer flight schedule begins. The plan is to move into the new passenger terminal by that date.

== Cargo traffic ==
Osijek Airport is primarily constructed for cargo traffic, due to Croatia's favorable geographic and transport position. One of the examples is that the airport's apron can handle large freighter aircraft such as the B747 and A330.

In order to get Croatia included into European transport network, government and local authorities are investing and developing transport infrastructure and combined transport activities: road and railroad network, international waterway, the Drava, with the cargo port and Osijek Airport.

The complex traffic Corridor Vc (road, railway, and river and air traffic) which connects Northern, Central and Southern Europe represents an opportunity to integrate economic development and traffic movement into the Central European area. It is opportunity – for all economic areas, such as manufacturers, distributors, as it for Osijek Airport.

== Čepin airfield ==
There is also a secondary airfield, used exclusively for sport and private flying purposes. Located South-West of the city centre, it is called Čepin and has ICAO code LDOC. It is also used for exhibitions. When Pope John Paul II visited Croatia, this was the place where the service was held. Also, the annual car-show is held here.

== Airlines and destinations ==
The following airlines operate regular scheduled and charter flights at Osijek Airport:

Airlines	Destinations
Croatia Airlines	Dubrovnik, Munich, Split
Ryanair	Seasonal: London–Stansted
Trade Air	Dubrovnik, Pula, Rijeka, Split, Zagreb; Seasonal: Zadar

== Statistics ==
Traffic at Osijek Airport
Year	Passengers	Cargo (kg)
1980–90	33,000 per year	N/A
2007	2,824	270,572
2008	▲14,883	173,050
2009	▲34,912	est. 180,000
2010	▼20,824	est. 190,000
2011	▲21,903	est. 250,000
2012	▼2,164	est. 180.000
2013	▲3,404	
2014	▲26,768	
2015	▲28,651	
2016	▲30,605	
2017	▲43,373	
2018	▲67,235	
2019	▼46,361	13,460
2020	▼6,625	
2021	▲11,515	
2022	▲15,875	
2023	▲36,791	
