= Dubrovnik Airport =

Dubrovnik Ruđer Bošković Airport Čilipi Airport

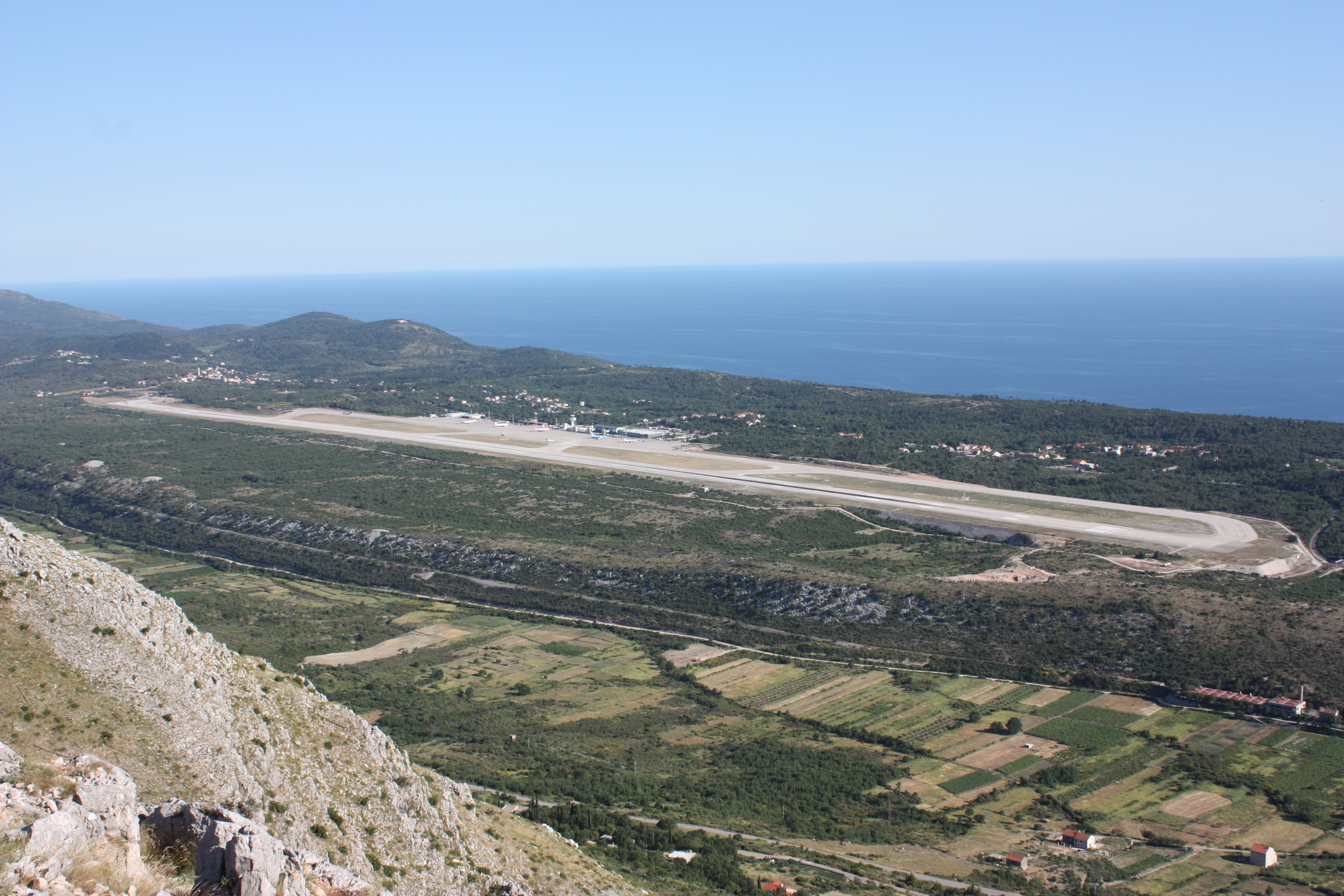
- IATA: DBV; ICAO: LDDU

Summary
- Airport type: Public
- Operator: Dubrovnik Airport Ltd.
- Serves: Dubrovnik-Neretva County
- Location: Močići, Croatia
- Hub for: Croatia Airlines
- Operating base for: Ryanair
- Elevation AMSL: 527 ft (161 m)
- Coordinates: 42°33′41″N 18°16′06″E
- Website: airport-dubrovnik.hr

Maps
- Airport diagram

- Location of the airport in Croatia

Runways
Direction	Length		Surface
Direction	m	ft	Surface
11/29	3,300	10,827	Concrete/Asphalt

Statistics (2025)
- Passengers: 3,090,245 ▲4.6%
- Croatian Aeronautical Information Publication Statistics from Dubrovnik Airport site

Dubrovnik Ruđer Bošković Airport (Croatian: Zračna luka Ruđer Bošković Dubrovnik; IATA: DBV, ICAO: LDDU), also referred to as Čilipi Airport (Croatian pronunciation: [tʃǐlipi]), is the international airport of Dubrovnik, Croatia. The airport is located approximately 15.5 km (9.5 mi) from Dubrovnik city center, near Čilipi. It was the third-busiest airport in Croatia in 2025 after Zagreb Airport and Split Airport in terms of passenger throughput. It has the country's longest runway, allowing it to accommodate heavy long-haul aircraft. The airport is a major destination for leisure flights during the European summer holiday season.

== History ==
In 1936, the Yugoslav flag carrier Aeroput used a seaplane station in Dubrovnik to open the first route to the national capital Belgrade via Sarajevo. The following year a route to Zagreb was inaugurated. However, the city was primarily served by an airfield at Gruda, approximately 5 kilometres (3.1 miles) south-east of the current airport, which opened for commercial traffic in 1936, initially only in use during the summer months. But it was in 1938 that Dubrovnik saw a significant increase in air traffic, with the introduction by Aeroput of regular flights to Vienna, Brno and Prague with stops in Sarajevo and Zagreb, and also the introduction of a regular flight between Belgrade and Tirana with a stop in Dubrovnik. By the early 1940s, due to World War II, Aeroput operations were suspended.

After World War II, Gruda Airfield continued in operation until the current Dubrovnik Airport opened in 1962. During 1987, the busiest year in Yugoslav aviation, the airport handled 835,818 passengers on international flights and a further 586,742 on domestic services. Following the breakup of Yugoslavia, the airport surpassed the one-million-passenger mark in 2005. In September 2023, it surpassed the two-million-passenger mark.

Today, Dubrovnik boasts the most modern passenger terminal in the country. A new terminal has been built in place of the old airport building, that dated from 1962, which has now been demolished to make way for a new modern structure. The price tag of the project amounts to seventy million euros and is to be financed out of a loan from the European Bank for Reconstruction and Development. In May 2010 a new terminal opened stretching over 13,700 square meters. Dubrovnik Airport has the capacity to handle two million passengers per year.

In 2023 the airport was renamed to honor the astronomer and polymath Roger Joseph Boscovich (Ruđer Josip Bošković, 1711–1787). The rebranding of the company was done by the branding consultancy Filburg.

== Terminal facilities ==
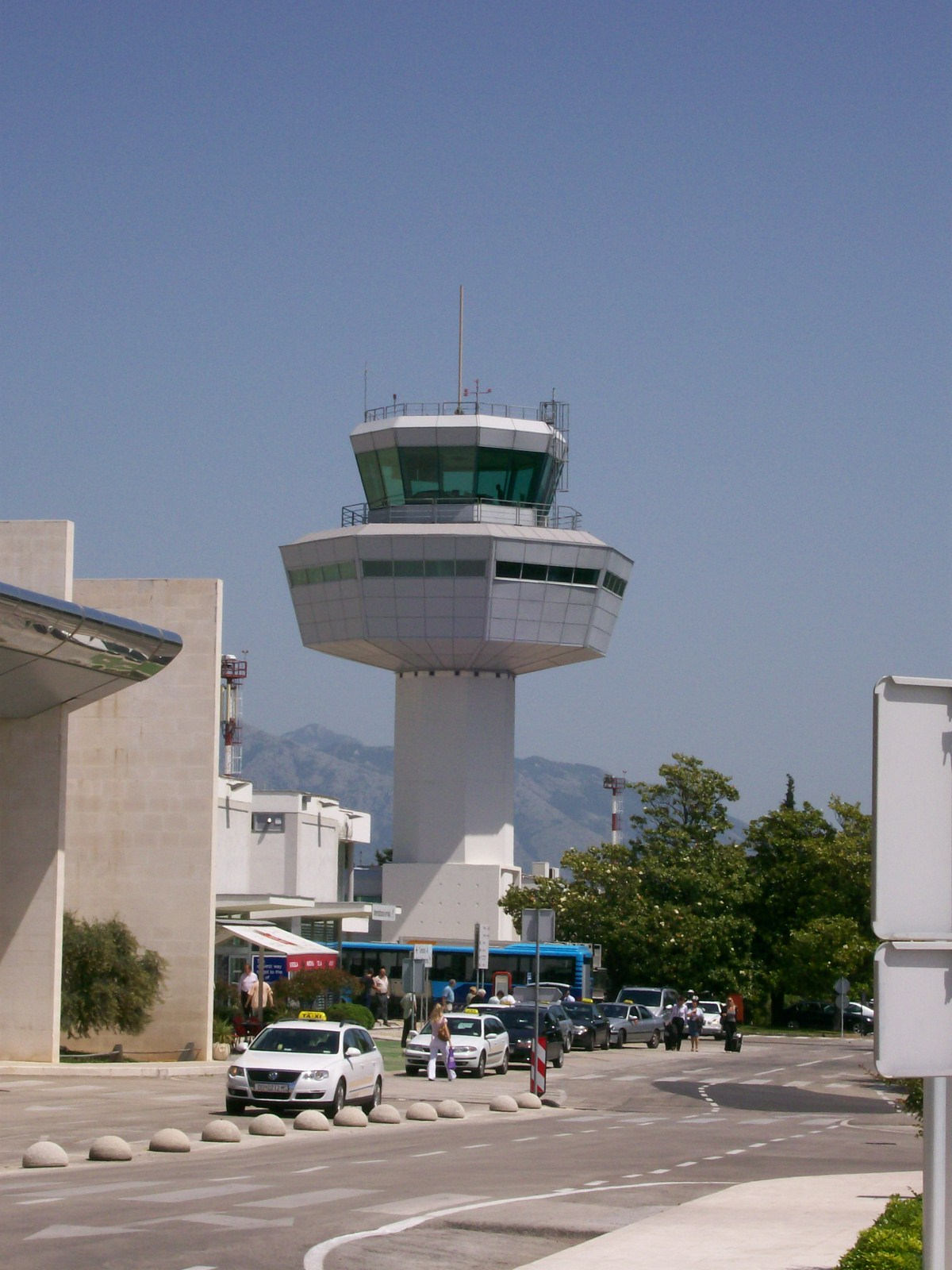
Control tower

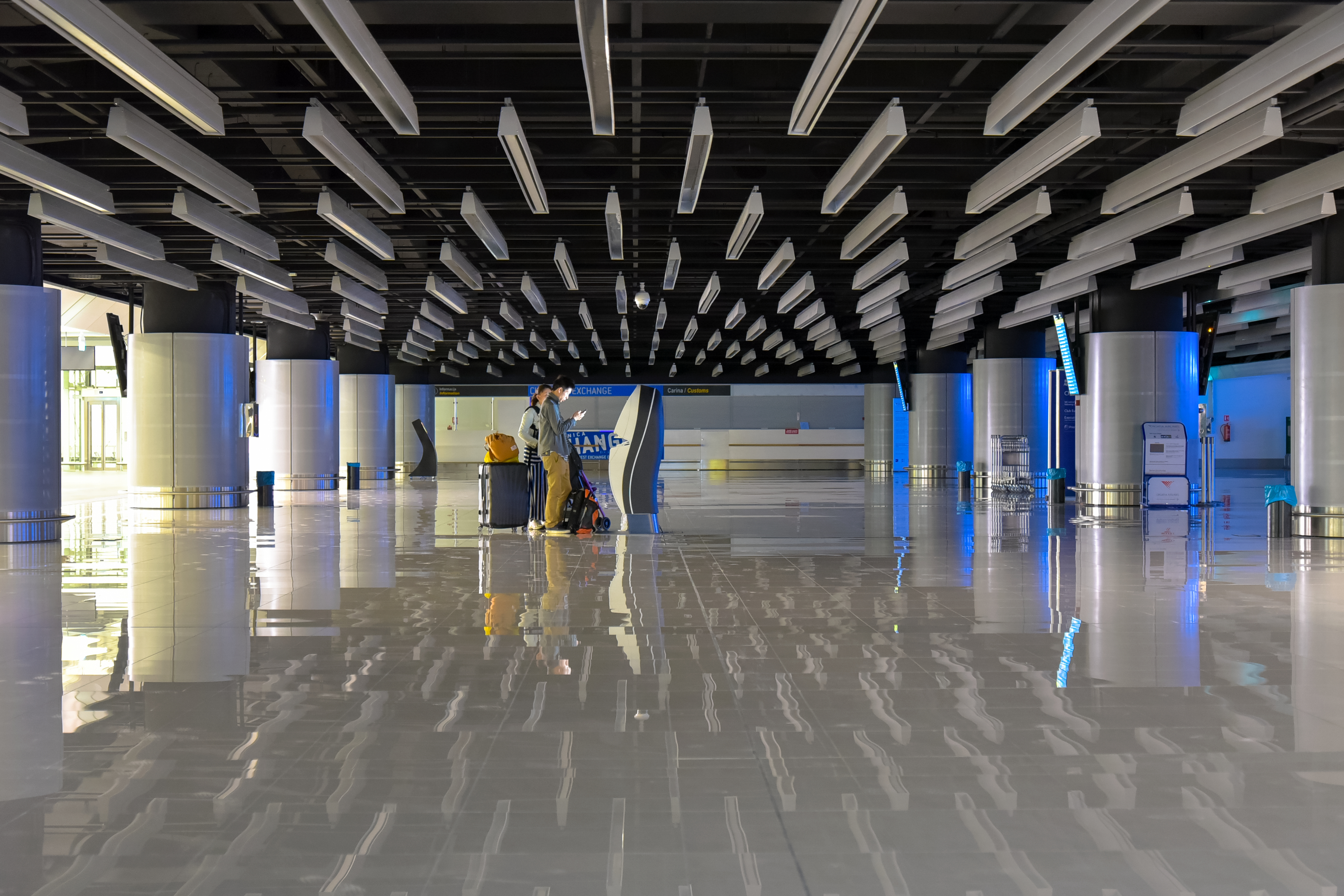
Dubrovnik Airport inside

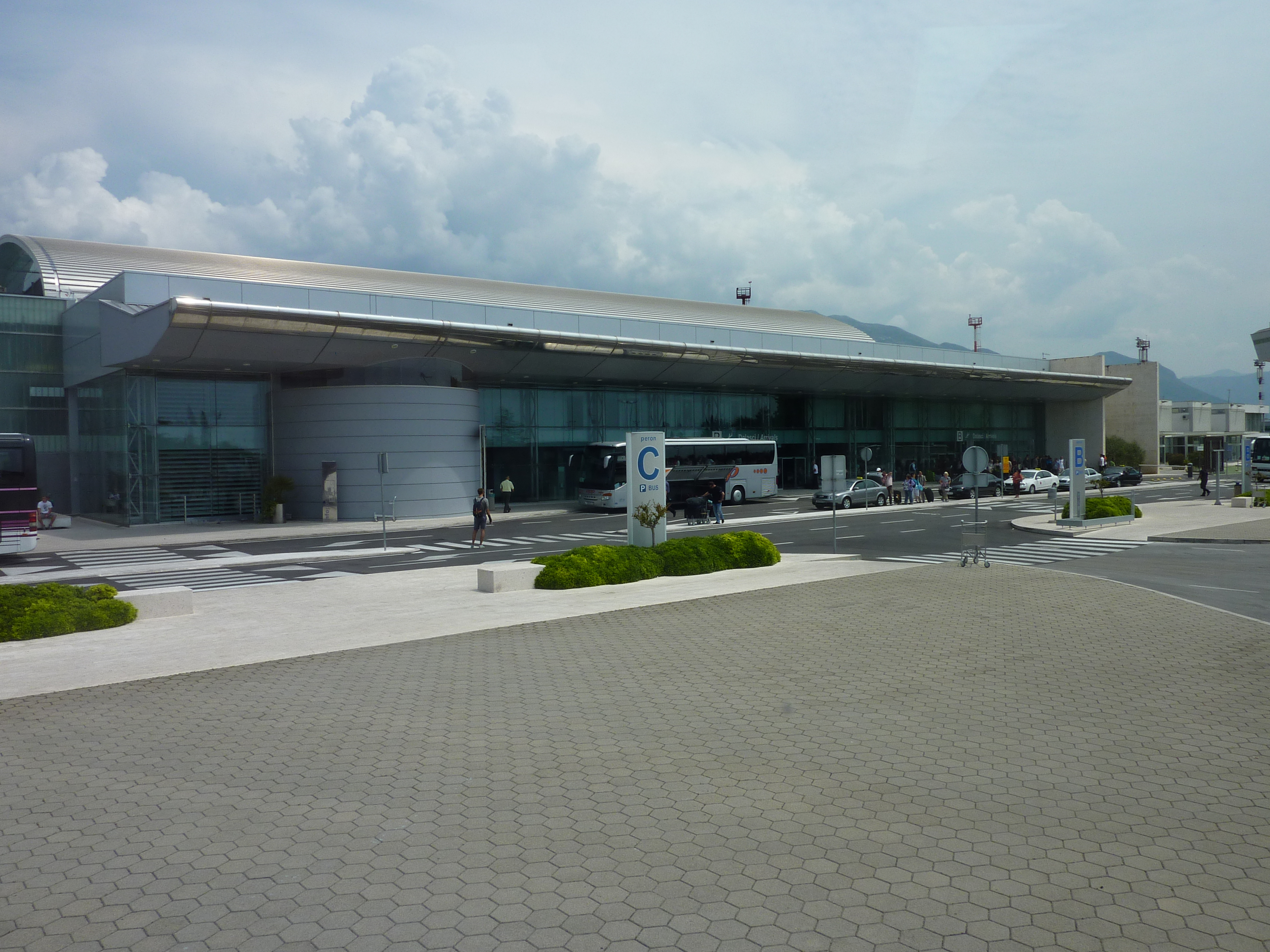
Terminal

Dubrovnik Airport consists of three terminal areas, A, B and C. The spacious new Terminal C was opened in February 2017 and became fully functional in April 2017 as it replaced Terminal A for all passenger departures including check-in and security check. The new terminal features check-in and commercial space stretching over 1,000 square meters, eight security lanes, a departure lounge with commercial and catering facilities, a premium lounge and restaurants. Furthermore, it boasts sixteen gates, two of which will be used for domestic flights and the remaining fourteen for international services. With an area of 24,181 m^{2} (260,280 sq ft), the airport's annual capacity has increased to 3.5 million passengers. The Terminal A building has been permanently closed for passenger traffic and is now being used solely as a baggage sorting facility. The new Terminal C is located next to the existing Terminal B building which handles arriving passengers. The two have been combined into a single functioning unit.

== Airlines and destinations ==
The following airlines operate regular scheduled and charter flights at Dubrovnik Airport:

Airlines	Destinations
Aegean Airlines	Seasonal: Athens, Thessaloniki
Aer Lingus	Seasonal: Dublin
Air Canada	Seasonal: Montréal–Trudeau (begins 11 May 2027)
Air France	Seasonal: Paris–Charles de Gaulle
Air Serbia	Belgrade
Austrian Airlines	Seasonal: Vienna
British Airways	Seasonal: London–Gatwick, London–Heathrow
Brussels Airlines	Seasonal: Brussels
Croatia Airlines	Frankfurt, Rome–Fiumicino, Zagreb; Seasonal: Athens, Munich, Osijek, Paris–Charles de Gaulle, Prague, Stuttgart, Zürich
Discover Airlines	Frankfurt
EasyJet	Seasonal: Basel/Mulhouse, Bordeaux, Bristol , Edinburgh, Geneva, London–Gatwick, Lyon, Manchester, Nantes, Naples, Paris–Orly
Enter Air	Seasonal charter: Poznań
Eurowings	Seasonal: Cologne/Bonn, Düsseldorf
Finnair	Seasonal: Helsinki
Flydubai	Seasonal: Dubai–International
Freebird Airlines	Charter: Amsterdam, Berlin, Billund, Brussels, Copenhagen, Düsseldorf, Frankfurt, Helsinki, London–Gatwick, Lyon, Oslo, Paris–Charles de Gaulle, Stockholm–Arlanda
Iberia	Seasonal: Madrid
Jet2.com	Seasonal: Belfast–International, Birmingham, East Midlands, Edinburgh, Glasgow, Leeds/Bradford, London-Gatwick (begins 3 May 2027), London-Luton (begins 7 May 2027), London–Stansted, Manchester, Newcastle upon Tyne
KLM	Seasonal: Amsterdam
LOT Polish Airlines	Seasonal: Warsaw–Chopin
Lufthansa	Seasonal: Munich
Luxair	Seasonal: Luxembourg
Norwegian Air Shuttle	Seasonal: Bergen, Copenhagen, Oslo, Stavanger, Stockholm–Arlanda
Ryanair	Dublin, Kraków, London–Stansted; Seasonal: Bari, Beauvais, Bergamo, Charleroi, Budapest, Gdańsk, Gothenburg, Helsinki, Karlsruhe/Baden-Baden, Katowice, Manchester, Marseille, Memmingen, Poznań, Rome–Fiumicino, Sandefjord, Stockholm–Arlanda, Warsaw–Modlin (begins 29 March 2027) Weeze, Wrocław
Scandinavian Airlines	Seasonal: Copenhagen
Sundor	Seasonal: Tel Aviv
Swiss International Air Lines	Seasonal: Zurich
Trade Air	Osijek, Rijeka, Split
Transavia	Seasonal: Paris–Orly, Rotterdam/The Hague
TUI Airways	Seasonal: Birmingham, Bristol, Cardiff, East Midlands, Glasgow, Leeds/Bradford, London–Gatwick, Manchester, Newcastle upon Tyne
TUI fly Belgium	Seasonal: Brussels
Turkish Airlines	Seasonal: Istanbul
United Airlines	Seasonal: Newark
Volotea	Seasonal: Athens, Bordeaux, Lille, Marseille, Nantes
Vueling	Barcelona
Wizz Air	Seasonal: Bucharest–Otopeni, Budapest, Cluj-Napoca, Gdańsk, Katowice, Warsaw–Chopin

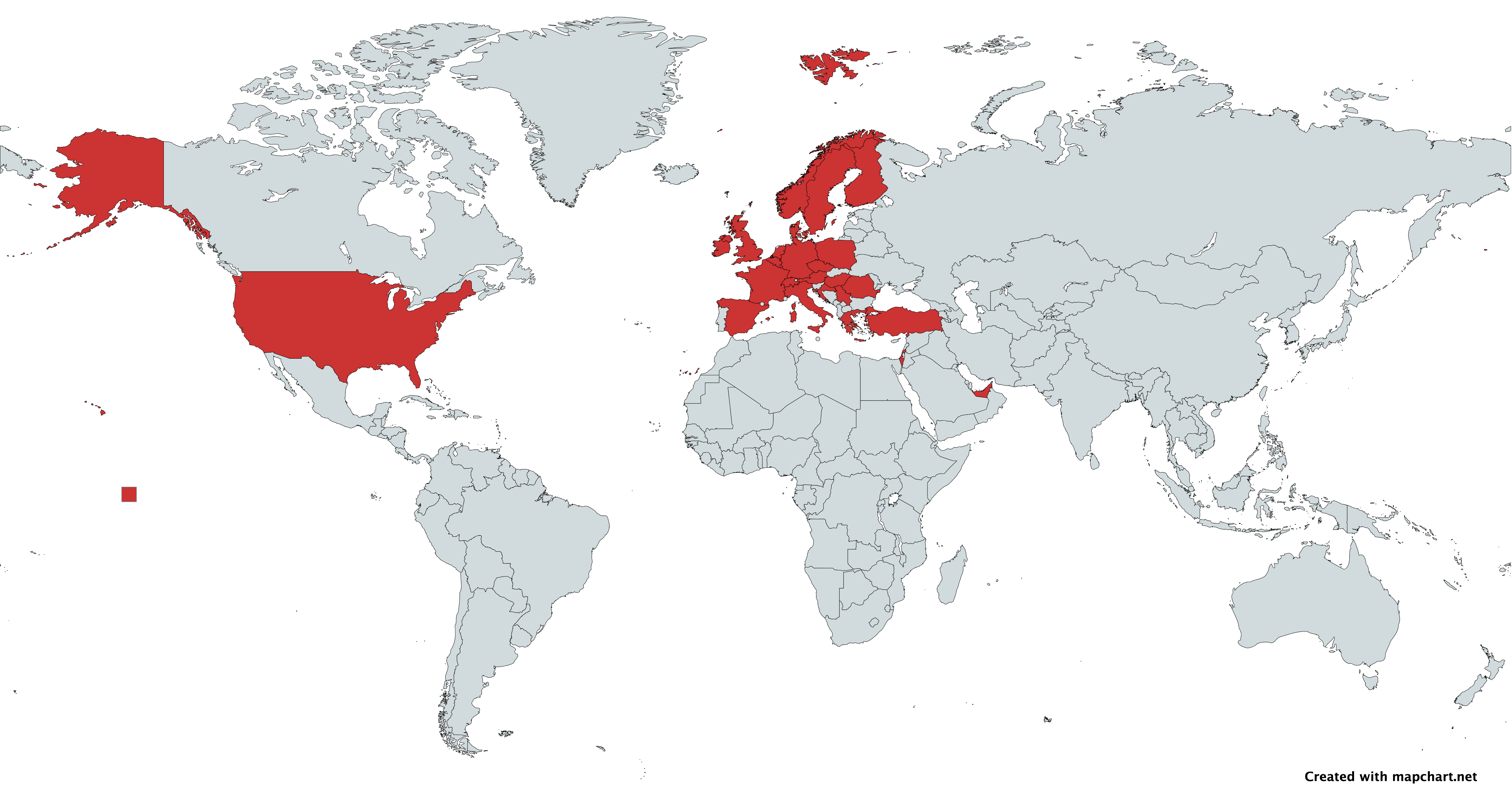
DBV countries as of May 2026

== Statistics ==
=== Traffic figures ===
Traffic at Dubrovnik Rudjer Boskovic Airport
Year	Passengers	Passenger % Change	Aircraft Landings	Aircraft Landings% Change	Cargo (tonnes)	Cargo % Change
1987	1,460,354	20.52▲	15,606	2.55▲	2,490	0.53▲
2015	1,693,934	6.91▲	16,852	2.18▲	256	12.03▼
2016	1,993,243	17.67▲	19,244	14.19▲	224	12.50▼
2017	2,323,065	16.5▲	21,496	11.70▲	204	8.90▼
2018	2,539,412	9.31▲	23,596	9.76▲	176	13.70▼
2019	2,896,227	14.05▲	25,962	10.03▲	127	28.41▼
2020	330,147	88.6▼	8,486	67.31▼	29	77.17▼
2021	927,934	181.1▲	14,212	67.47▲	390	1244▲
2022	2,149,181	131.6▲	20,630	45.16▲	411	5.3▲
2023	2,416,818	12.46▲	21,484	4.14▲	57	86.14▼
2024	2.954,934	22.26▲	25.546	18.91▲	25	55.91▼
2025	3,090,245	4.6▲	26.682	4.44▲	301	1197.91▲
2026 (January - July)	1,780,389	4.38▲	15,246	3.07▲		

Traffic at Dubrovnik Rudjer Boskovic Airport in 2025/2026 by month
Month	Passengers 2025	Passengers 2026	Passenger % Change
January	19,856	23,688	19.30▲
February	22,314	22,950	2.85▲
March	48,998	55,559	13.39▲
April	245,397	254,931	3.89▲
May	378,505	399,917	5.66▲
June	450,007	464,816	3.29▲
July	540,619	558,528	3.31▲
August	543.733		
September	443.444		
October	315.409		
November	50.120		
December	31.843		

=== Largest airlines ===
Rank	Carrier	Passengers 2018	%
1	Croatia Airlines	429,953	16.93
2	easyJet	347,260	13.67
3	Jet2.com	179,990	7.09
4	TUI Airways	127,352	5.02
5	Vueling	123,907	4.88
Source: Dubrovnik Airport

== Ground transport ==
A shuttle bus operated by the company Platanus connects the airport to Dubrovnik Old Town and Dubrovnik Bus Station in Gruž.

== Incidents and accidents ==
- USAF CT-43 crash: On April 3, 1996 a United States Air Force CT-43 aircraft carrying a Department of Commerce delegation crashed north of the airport on St. John's hill. The accident killed 35 people, including Ron Brown, then-Secretary of Commerce.
