= Trade Air =

Croatian airline

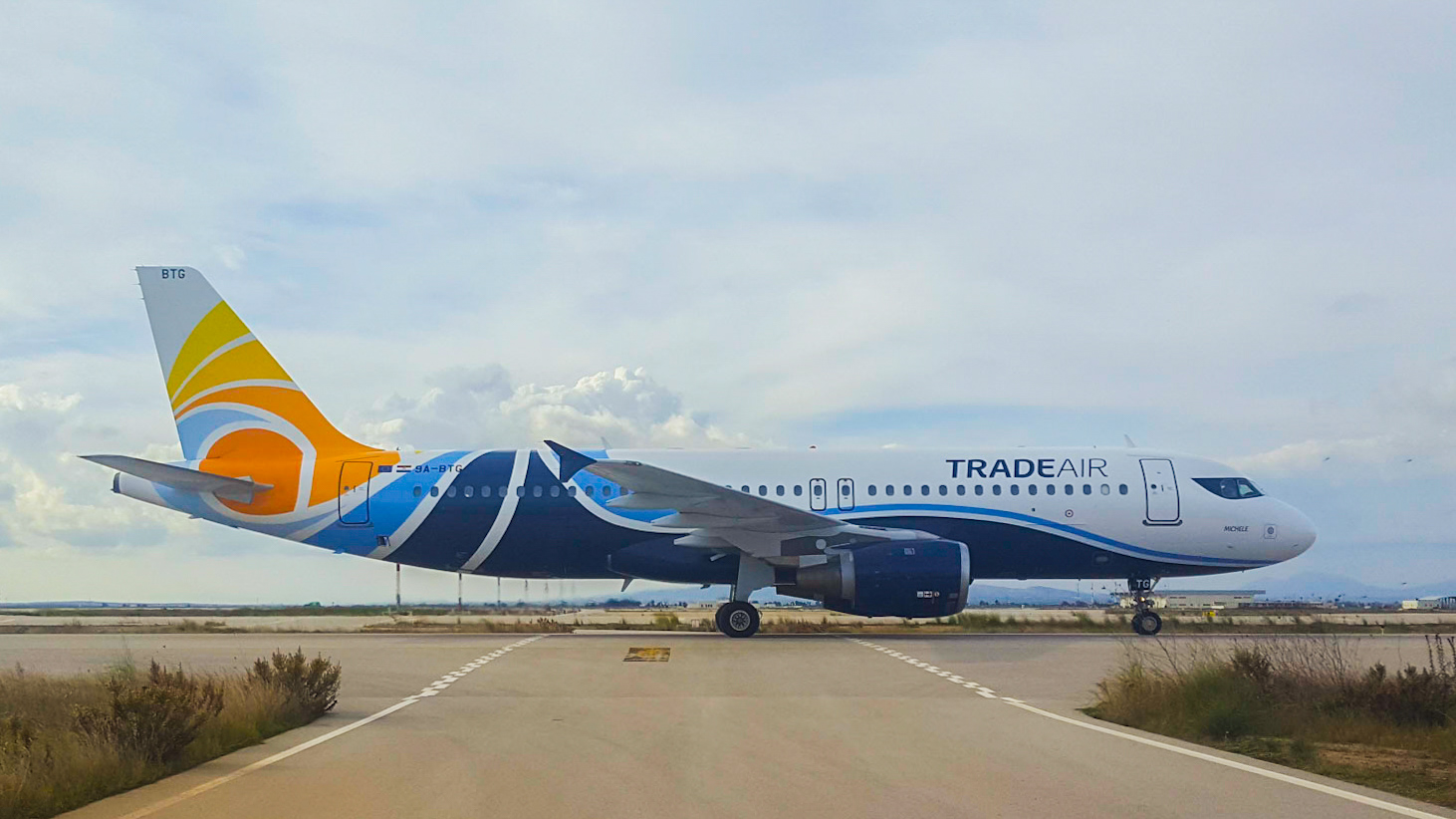
- Airbus A320-200
IATA	ICAO	Call sign
C3	TDR	TRADE AIR
- Founded: April 1994
- Commenced operations: 22 May 1995
- Hubs: Zagreb Airport, Croatia
- Secondary hubs: Ljubljana Jože Pučnik International Airport, Slovenia
- Fleet size: 5
- Destinations: 7 (scheduled)
- Headquarters: Zagreb, Croatia
- Key people: Marko Cvijin
- Website: trade-air.com

Trade Air d.o.o. is a Croatian passenger and cargo charter airline headquartered in Zagreb and based at Zagreb Airport. The company is registered as an airline whose main activities are passenger charter flights and cargo operations organized either on charter chain flights or ad hoc flights. Trade Air also specializes in the transportation of dangerous goods.

== History ==
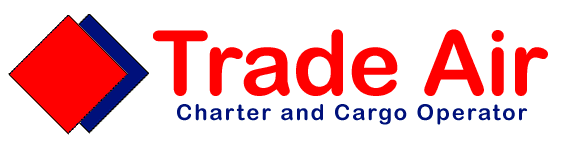
Former logo

Trade Air was established in April 1994 and started operations on 22 May 1995. It is a private company fully owned by Mihajlo Cvijin.

In 2004, the airline added two Fokker 100 aircraft to their fleet and started to use them to operate charter flights for passengers in March 2005. In November 2007, Trade Air operated flights with their Fokker 100 aircraft in Australia, transporting journalists as one of two dedicated carriers for the Australian federal elections.

Between November 2004 and February 2005, Trade Air based one of its Let 410s in Bosnia and Herzegovina, in a short-lived and ultimately failed attempt to operate flights between Mostar and Zagreb under the Bosnia Airlines brand.

In March 2007, the airline was anonymously accused of allegedly overloading their aircraft with cargo and having pilots who allegedly flew every consecutive day for two or three weeks without taking a minimum 36-hour rest period within any seven consecutive days. Legislators dismissed the anonymous accusations.

In May 2008, the airline received IOSA certification.

Until June 2010, Trade Air operated scheduled flights between Zagreb, Ljubljana, and Sarajevo with two Let L-410 Turbolet aircraft besides other charter flights for either cargo or passengers. In the summer of 2013, Trade Air started scheduled operations supported by the Croatian Ministry for Sea Transport and Infrastructure between Osijek and Zagreb. This was the first time this route was served after 26 years. In May 2016, Trade Air started operating scheduled flights for Croatia Airlines from Zagreb to Athens, Barcelona, Brussels, Copenhagen, Dubrovnik, and Lisbon.

In February 2017, Trade Air secured a contract with Swiss travel agency PowdAir to operate winter ski-charter flights to several destinations from Sion Airport from winter 2017. In 2018, Trade Air secured an ongoing contract with Israeli company Israir Airlines for flights from Tel Aviv to destinations in Europe.

In September 2024, Trade Air retired the Airbus A319 aircraft registration number 9A-BTJ that flew under the My Wings airline name.

== Destinations ==
As of May 2023, Trade Air operates scheduled flights between the following domestic and international destinations under its brand:

City	Country	IATA	ICAO	Airport
Dubrovnik	Croatia	DBV	LDDU	Dubrovnik Airport
Pula	Croatia	PUY	LDPL	Pula Airport
Osijek	Croatia	OSI	LDOS	Osijek Airport
Rijeka	Croatia	RJK	LDRI	Rijeka Airport
Split	Croatia	SPU	LDSP	Split Airport
Zagreb	Croatia	ZAG	LDZA	Zagreb Airport
Zadar	Croatia	ZAD	LDZD	Zadar Airport

== Fleet ==
=== Current fleet ===
As of July 2026, Trade Air operates the following aircraft:

Trade Air fleet
Aircraft	In service	Orders	Passengers	Notes
Airbus A320	5	—	180	
Total	5	—		

=== Former fleet ===
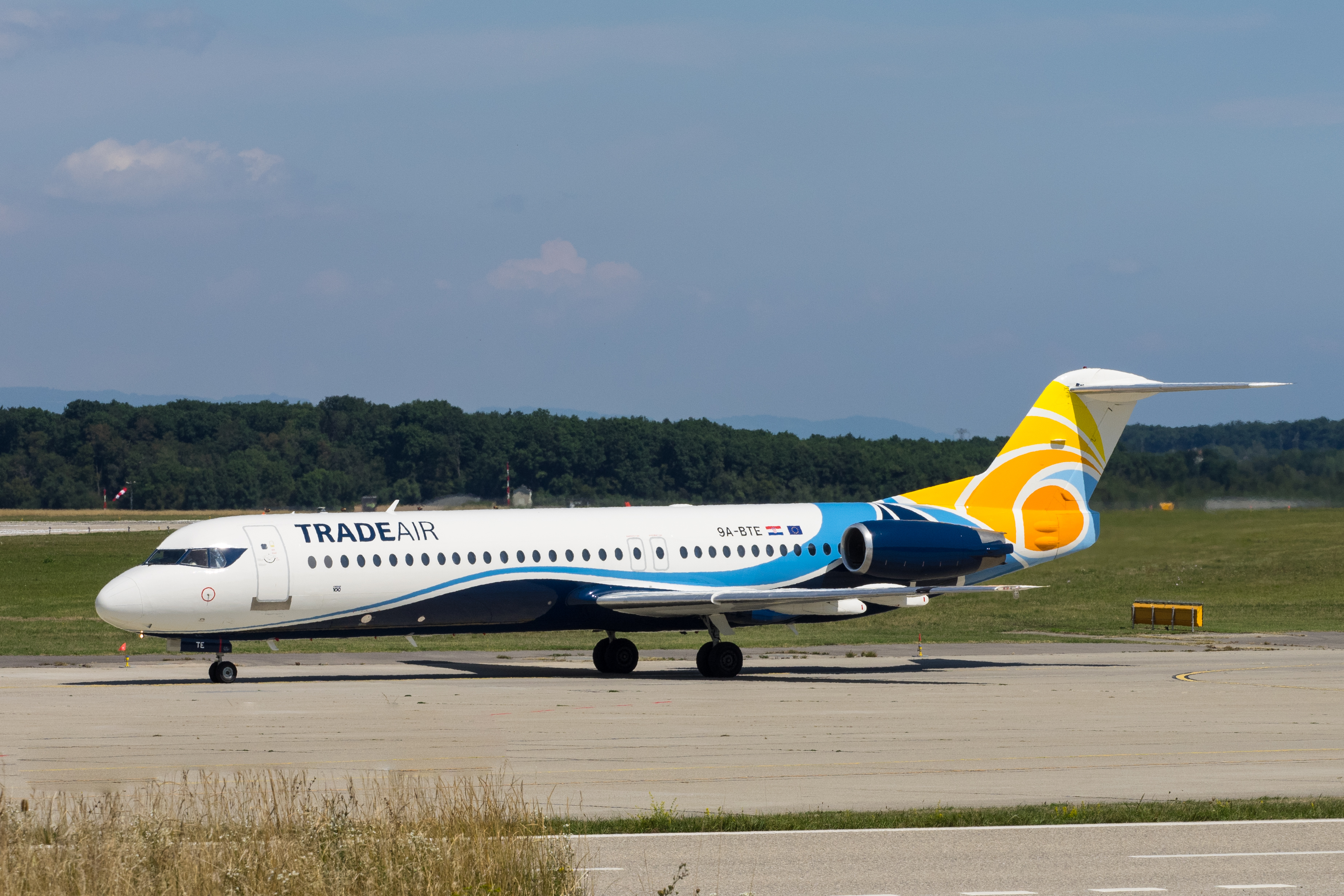
Fokker 100

As of September 2024, Trade Air fleet operated 1 Airbus A319, 4 Airbus A320 and 1 Saab 340.

Trade Air also formerly operated the following aircraft types:

- 1 ATR 42-500 (2008-2009, leased from Danish Air Transport)
- 1 British Aerospace Jetstream 32 (2016-2018, leased from AIS Airlines)
- 1 Embraer EMB 120 Brasilia (2013-2016, leased from Budapest Aircraft Service)
- 3 Fokker 100 (2004-2022)
- 7 Let L-410 Turbolet (1995-2009)

== Accidents and incidents ==
- On 30 October 2005, Trade Air Flight 729 crashed near Bergamo, Italy, shortly after taking off from Orio al Serio Airport in poor weather. The flight was a night-time cargo flight from Bergamo to Zagreb operated by a Let L-410 Turbolet with the registration 9A-BTA. All three people on board, two pilots and a passenger were killed.
