= CloudHQ =

Software company

cloudHQ
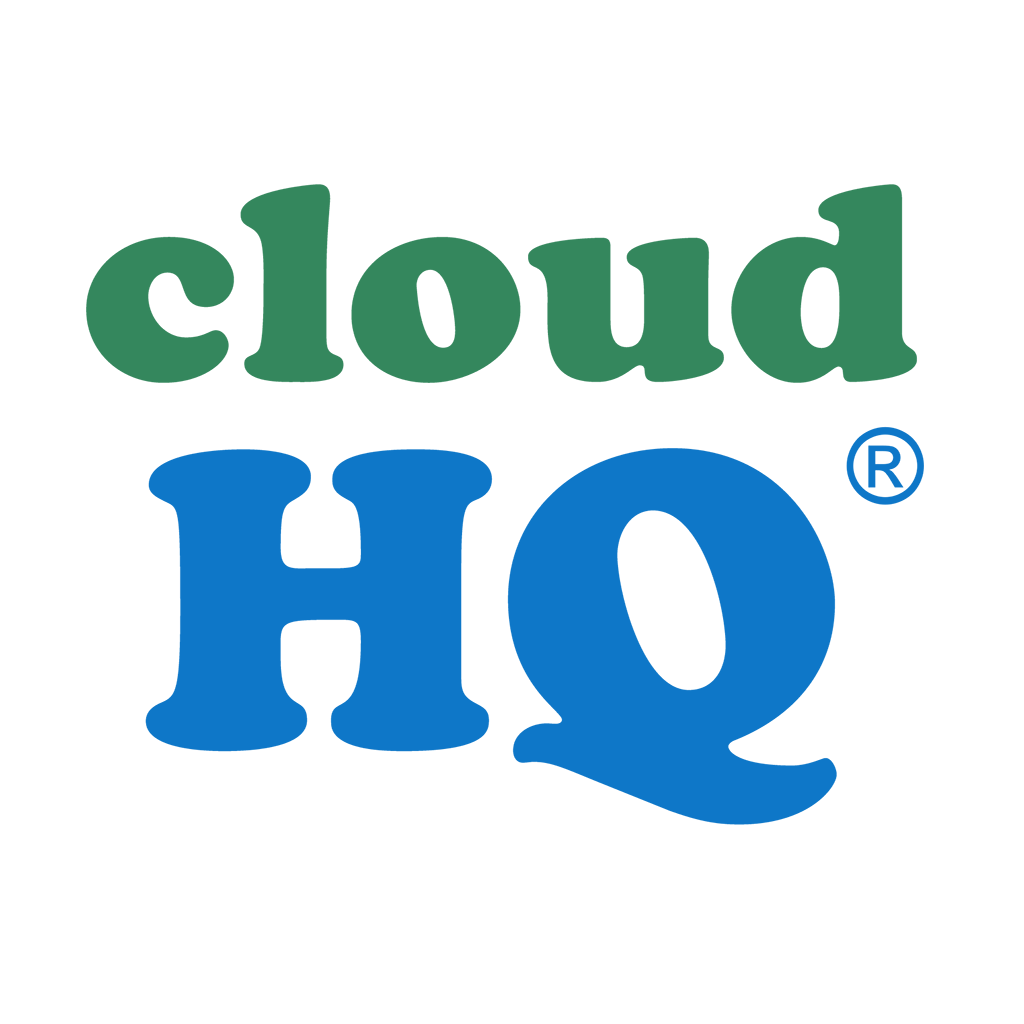
- Industry: Software
- Founded: 2011; 14 years ago in San Francisco, California, US
- Headquarters: San Francisco, California, U.S.
- Website: www.cloudhq.net

cloudHQ is an information technology company based in San Francisco, California. It was founded in 2011 by Senad Dizdar. Naomi Assaraf has been the Chief Marketing Officer (CMO) since 2013, and Blaz Lupiscek is Chief Technology Officer (CTO).

The software synchronizes data across many cloud platforms, such as Google Workspace, Egnyte, Box, Dropbox, and Microsoft 365. Data is replicated to a backup cloud account to reduce the risks of data loss incidents which have steadily risen in the recent years. The platform is also intended for data migration or to allow sharing of files and data across multiple, as well as collaboration across multiple platforms.

CloudHQ also creates many browser extensions for apps such as Gmail and others.
