= Klisa, Bihać =

Klisa
- Village
- Location within Bosnia and Herzegovina
- Coordinates: 44.6007°N 16.0604°E
- Country: Bosnia and Herzegovina
- Entity: Federation of Bosnia and Herzegovina
- Canton: Una-Sana
- Municipality: Bihać

Area
  - Total: 2.63 sq mi (6.82 km^{2})

Population (2013)
  - Total: 184
  - Density: 69.9/sq mi (27.0/km^{2})
- Time zone: UTC+1 (CET)
  - Summer (DST): UTC+2 (CEST)

Klisa is a village in the municipality of Bihać, Bosnia and Herzegovina.

== Demographics ==
According to the 2013 census, its population was 184.

Ethnicity in 2013
Ethnicity	Number	Percentage
Bosniaks	177	96.2%
Croats	2	1.1%
other/undeclared	5	2.7%
Total	184	100%
