= Klisa, Osijek-Baranja County =

Klisa
- Village (Selo)
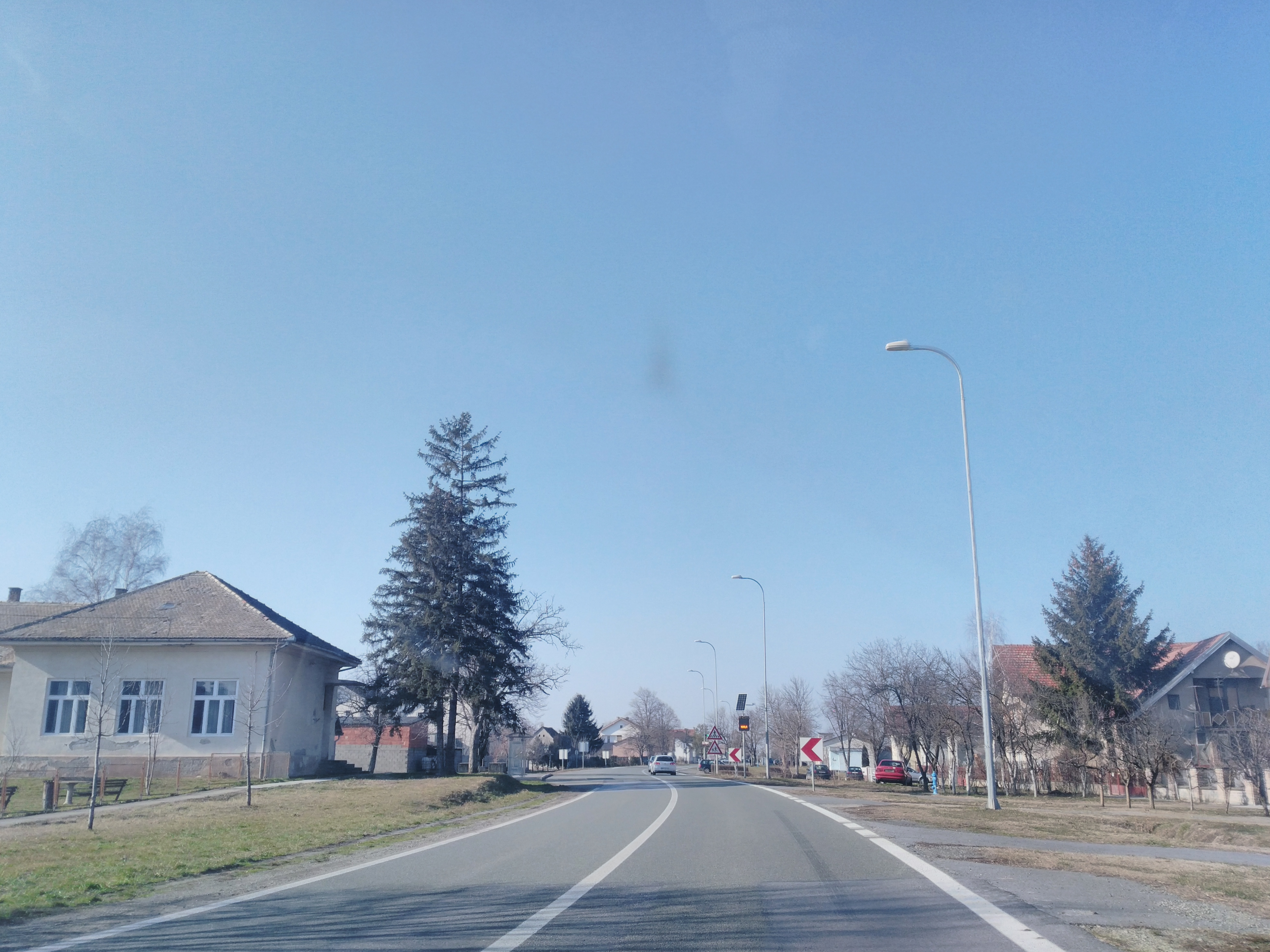
- Interactive map of Klisa
- Location within Osijek-Baranja County Location within Croatia Location within Europe
- Coordinates: 45.475343°N 18.833291°E
- Country: Croatia
- Region: Slavonia (Podunavlje)
- County: Osijek-Baranja
- City: Osijek

Government
  - Type: Local committee
  - Body: Klisa Local Committee

Area
  - Total: 5.3 km^{2} (2.0 sq mi)
- Elevation: 88 m (289 ft)

Population (2021)
  - Total: 242
  - Density: 46/km^{2} (120/sq mi)
- Demonym(s): Klišanin (♂) Klišanka (♀) (per grammatical gender)
- Time zone: UTC+1 (CET)
  - Summer (DST): UTC+2 (CEST)
- Postal code: 31 207

Klisa (Serbian Cyrillic: Клиса, Hungarian: Tard) is a village in Croatia. Klisa is administratively part of the City of Osijek and is administered as one of suburbs. The Osijek Airport is located southwest of the village. Klisa belongs to the first category among the Areas of Special State Concern. The settlement was originally one of regional pustaras, a Pannonian type of hamlet. It was established as a colonist settlement during the land reform in interwar Yugoslavia.

== Geography ==
Klisa is connected with the rest of country by the D2 road and the Osijek Airport. There are 4 streets in total in village and they bear the names Vukovarska, Radnička, Dalmatinska and Đura Jakšić Street. Until 1991 Klisa was administratively part of the Vukovar municipality. Historically, up to 1948, Klisa was statistically reported as a part of Bobota or Bijelo Brdo.

== Demographics ==
At the time of 2011 Census of Croatia, 83% of the local population comprised Serbs, while ethnic Croats were 16% of the population. Klisa is facing very high level of population decline caused by high death rate, low birth rate and high emigration. Together with Tvrđavica, Klisa has the worst demographic indicators among the settlements of the City of Osijek. Population of Klisa is on average the oldest in the City of Osijek. If current trends remain in place, population projection for Klisa estimate that village will be extinct until 2050.

Klisa: Population trends 1857–2021
v

population	5	51	71	129	118	115	18	124	176	225	331	308	346	419	463	324	242
	1857	1869	1880	1890	1900	1910	1921	1931	1948	1953	1961	1971	1981	1991	2001	2011	2021

Note:Was a part of another settlement up to 1931. Standalone settlement since 1948. Enlarged by annexing part of Bobota and Bijelo Brdo in 1991. Sources: Croatian Bureau of Statistics publications

== Politics ==
In 2018 local elections in Osijek Klisa was a polling place with the lowest turnout. Only 15 voters participated in elections constituting turnout of just below 6%. 14 out of 15 voters voted for the Democratic Alliance of Serbs which was the only party on the local ballot while one vote was irregular. The Independent Democratic Serb Party, dominant party among the Serbs of Croatia, did not participate in the elections while the Croatian Democratic Union was an absolute winner at the city level.

== Education ==
Branch school of Elementary school Bobota is located in Klisa, 4 kilometers away from central school in Bobota. Education at the local school in Klisa is conducted in Serbian. The school building in Vera was built in 1924 and additional parts were completed in 1933. The school has only one classroom, hallway, toilets and a storage room. Building is in poor condition due to deterioration of the roof construction, carpentry, and especially electrical installations.

== Culture ==
The day of Pentecost, as celebrated in accordance with the Eastern Orthodox Julian Calendar, is the public holiday of the Local Council of Klisa.

Since 2001 the City and University Library of Osijek is providing bookmobile services in Klisa. Vehicle was a gift from the Balkan Peace Project from Haarlem in the Netherlands while the City of Osijek is paying salaries for employees.
