= Dick Benschop =

Dutch politician and corporate executive (born 1957)

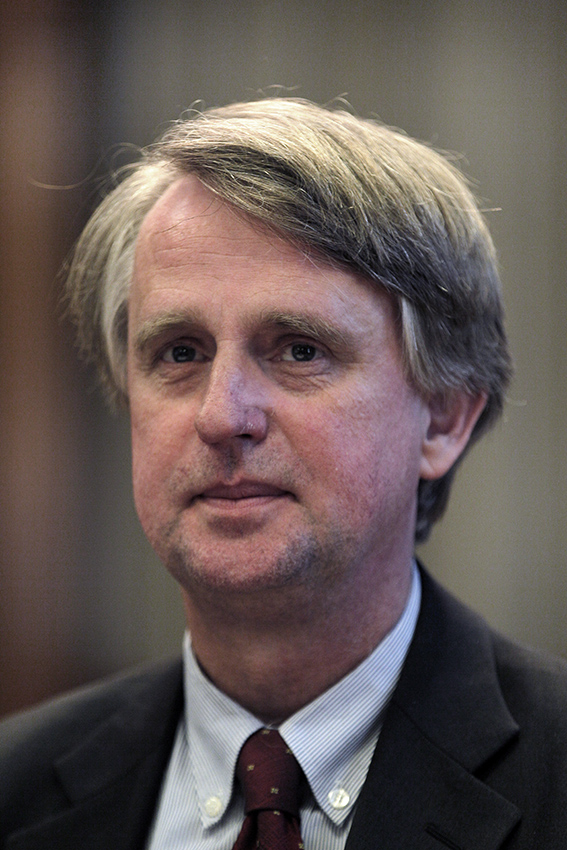
- Benschop in 2012

State Secretary for European Affairs
- In office 3 August 1998 – 22 July 2002
- Minister: Jozias van Aartsen
- Cabinet: Kok II
- Preceded by: Michiel Patijn
- Succeeded by: Atzo Nicolaï

Member of the House of Representatives
- In office 23 May 2002 – 31 August 2002
- Succeeded by: Gerritjan van Oven

Personal details
- Born: Dirk Anne Benschop; 5 November 1957 (age 68) Driebergen, Netherlands
- Party: Labour Party
- Spouse: Elisabeth Minnemann
- Children: 3
- Education: Vrije Universiteit Amsterdam
- Occupation: Politician; political consultant; corporate executive

Dirk Anne "Dick" Benschop (Dutch: [ˈdɪk ˈbɛnsxɔp]; born 5 November 1957) is a Dutch corporate executive and politician of the Labour Party (PvdA). He served as State Secretary for European Affairs in the second Kok cabinet.

After studying history at Vrije Universiteit Amsterdam, he started his career as personal assistant of former prime minister Joop den Uyl in 1986, the year before Den Uyl's death. Benschop subsequently advised parliamentary leaders Wim Kok and Thijs Wöltgens. He did some consulting work before being sworn in as State Secretary for European Affairs in August 1998. He led the Labour Party's campaign in the May 2002 general election, in which Ad Melkert was lead candidate and in which the party lost 22 of its 45 seats in the House of Representatives. Benschop was elected, but he left parliament in August 2002.

He started working for Royal Dutch Shell the following year, and he served as president-director of Shell Netherlands from 2011 until 2015. Benschop became chief executive officer (CEO) of Royal Schiphol Group in 2018, leading the largest airport in the Netherlands. He resigned from his position in September 2022 after a personnel shortage had resulted in months of reduced capacity and long lines of passengers.

== Early life and education ==
Benschop was born in Driebergen on 5 November 1957 as the youngest child in a Reformed Christian family. His father worked as a municipal secretary in Driebergen, and both his grandfathers had been active in local politics in Meerkerk, as municipal councilor and as alderman. He attended secondary education in Doorn, graduating with a gymnasium diploma, and he subsequently studied history at Vrije Universiteit Amsterdam. He was chairman of the student council, and he was active in the Interchurch Peace Council (IKV). A book by Benschop about the preparation of a demonstration against nuclear weapons on 21 November 1981 was published in 1983. He had been a member of the Political Party of Radicals (PPR) since 1977, but he switched to the Labour Party (PvdA) in September 1981, serving as board secretary of its Amsterdam-Zuid chapter. Benschop graduated from university in 1984 with a master's degree.

Following his studies, he worked as a substitute history teacher in Den Helder for seven months, leaving the profession afterwards. He later called it the toughest job he ever had, and he was subsequently unemployed for a year.

== Politics ==
In 1986, he became the personal assistant of Joop den Uyl, a former prime minister and Labour Party leader. Den Uyl hired a historian as he was planning to write his autobiography. Following Den Uyl's death in late 1987, Benschop founded a foundation that organizes lectures in his memory. He advised Wim Kok, the party's parliamentary leader in the House of Representatives, and he became secretary of Thijs Wöltgens, when he succeeded Kok in 1989. Benschop later headed the party office, and he led the Labour Party's campaign in the May 1994 general election. He was the party's 52nd candidate. He established a solo consulting practice, working for clients including financial services company Aegon and Amsterdam Schiphol Airport. He advised the latter on public relations when it had plans for a new runway, and he also did political consulting work for environment minister Margreeth de Boer (PvdA). Benschop ended his practice in 1996 to work for the Dutch Media Authority, overseeing financial and technical matters. He occasionally wrote opinion pieces for Niet Nix, a youth movement connected to the Labour Party.

He joined the second Kok cabinet on 3 August 1998 as State Secretary for European Affairs. Benschop was aligned to the Ministry of Foreign Affairs, and he was the youngest member of the cabinet after State Secretary Margo Vliegenthart. He was described as a confidant of Prime Minister Kok, and Benschop helped him prepare for European Council meetings. Along with finance minister Gerrit Zalm, he campaigned to reduce the Dutch annual contribution to the European Union by ƒ1.3 billion. Their demand was met at the Berlin meeting in 1999. Benschop was involved in the Tampere meeting of the council on asylum and justice, he headed the Dutch delegation at the 2000 United Nations Climate Change Conference, held in The Hague, and he played in a role in establishing the Treaty of Nice. Along with Prime Minister Kok and Minister Van Aartsen, he oversaw the enactment of a law ratifying the Treaty of Amsterdam. Benschop supported the continued European integration.

He ran for parliament in the May 2002 general election as the seventh candidate on the Labour Party list, headed by Ad Melkert, and he served as its campaign manager. Benschop was elected to the House of Representatives, and he was sworn in on 23 May. The Labour Party lost 22 of its 45 seats in parliament. Benschop reflected on the loss, saying that the party should have made a clearer choice between either defending the previous purple coalitions or advocating for renewal. He also argued that the Labour Party had lost touch with part of its supporters by celebrating economic success despite their concerns. He announced that he would not be seeking political leadership of the party. Benschop's term as state secretary ended on 22 July 2002, when the first Balkenende cabinet was formed. He left the House of Representatives on 1 September 2002, saying that his character was not fit to serve in the opposition in the existing political climate. He was appointed Knight of the Order of Orange-Nassau on 10 December 2002.

== Corporate career ==
Benschop joined Royal Dutch Shell in July 2003 to shape the renewable energy transition strategy of its European energy business unit. He was a vice president for Shell in Kuala Lumpur, Malaysia from 2006 until 2009, and he returned to the Netherlands afterwards to serve as vice president for strategy and competitive intelligence. In May 2011, he succeeded Peter de Wit as president-director of Shell Netherlands. Following the 2012 Huizinge earthquake, caused by gas extraction from the Groningen field by Shell and ExxonMobil, the oversight body recommended to reduce the level of extraction. Newspaper NRC later reported based on internal memos that Benschop, strongly opposed to government intervention, successfully lobbied alongside ExxonMobil to avoid any restrictions. He held the position of president-director until December 2015, and he subsequently became responsible for joint ventures at Shell International.

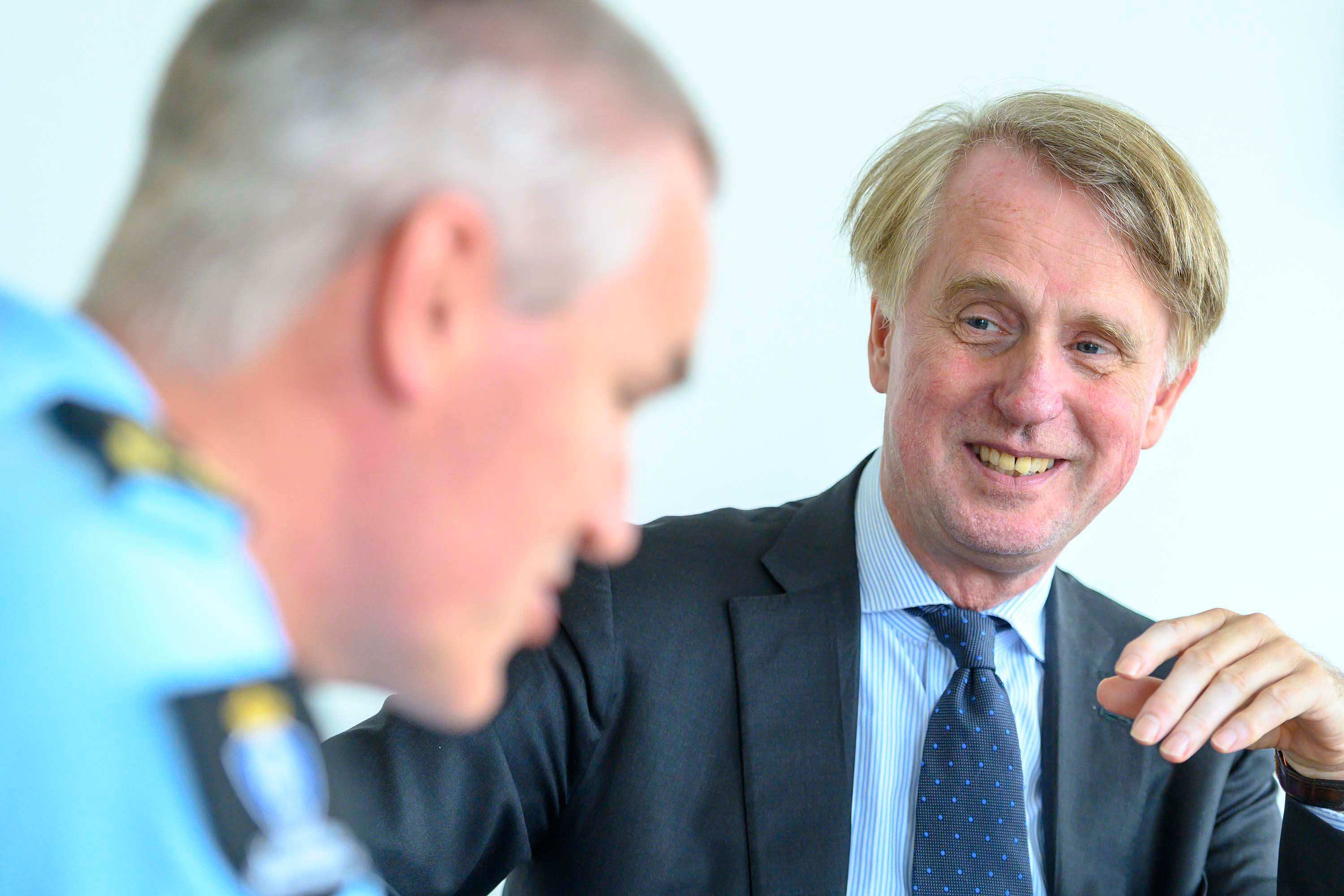
Benschop, while being interviewed as CEO of Royal Schiphol Group in 2019

In May 2018, he was appointed chief executive officer (CEO) of Royal Schiphol Group, which owns and operates several airports in the Netherlands, including Amsterdam Airport Schiphol. The organization was seeking public support for plans to grow the latter airport's annual flight movements to 590,000 per year, exceeding the existing limit of 500,000. Benschop led the organization during the COVID-19 pandemic, which had a major impact on commercial air transport. The opening of Lelystad Airport for commercial aviation, intended to absorb holiday flights from Schiphol Airport, was postponed due to concerns from nearby residents.

The supervisory board extended Benschop's term in October 2021 until 2026. A personnel shortage, especially among security staff, resulted in queues of several hours at Schiphol Airport starting in April 2022, causing some to miss their flights and to become unwell. Besides, the reduced capacity meant that 13,500 fewer passengers per day could depart during summer months. Trade union De Unie and politician Wybren van Haga called for Benschop's resignation. In June 2022, he reached an agreement with unions to raise wages, introduce a summer allowance, and issue a one-time bonus, thereby averting strikes. These concessions reduced revenues for the national government and the municipalities of Amsterdam and Rotterdam. The cabinet announced the same month that annual flight movements at Schiphol Airport would be reduced by 10% to 440,000 because of noise pollution. Personnel issues sustained after the summer season due to the expiration of the allowance. Declaring that he wanted to divert attention from himself, Benschop resigned as CEO of Royal Schiphol Group on 14 September 2022 as a result of the issues at the airport.

Benschop had several secondary positions. In 2013, he became chair of the supervisory board of The Hague Institute for Global Justice, which had been founded in 2011. The organization announced its closure due to bankruptcy in April 2018, and Benschop acknowledged he should have intervened sooner. He also chaired the Orange Fund (2016–2024) and the Christiaan Huygens Science Award Foundation, and he was a member of the executive committee of employers' federation VNO-NCW and the board of directors of Brisbane Airport Corporation and Groupe ADP. In 2021, he joined the board of Mission Possible Partnership, a non-governmental organization advocating the sustainability transition of the business sector. He served as its interim CEO in early 2024, and he became chair of the board in October 2024. In an interview with Nederlands Dagblad, Benschop conceded that more should have been achieved on sustainability during his time leading Shell Netherlands and Royal Schiphol Group, but he believed advancements being made in the transition deserved attention.

== Ideology ==
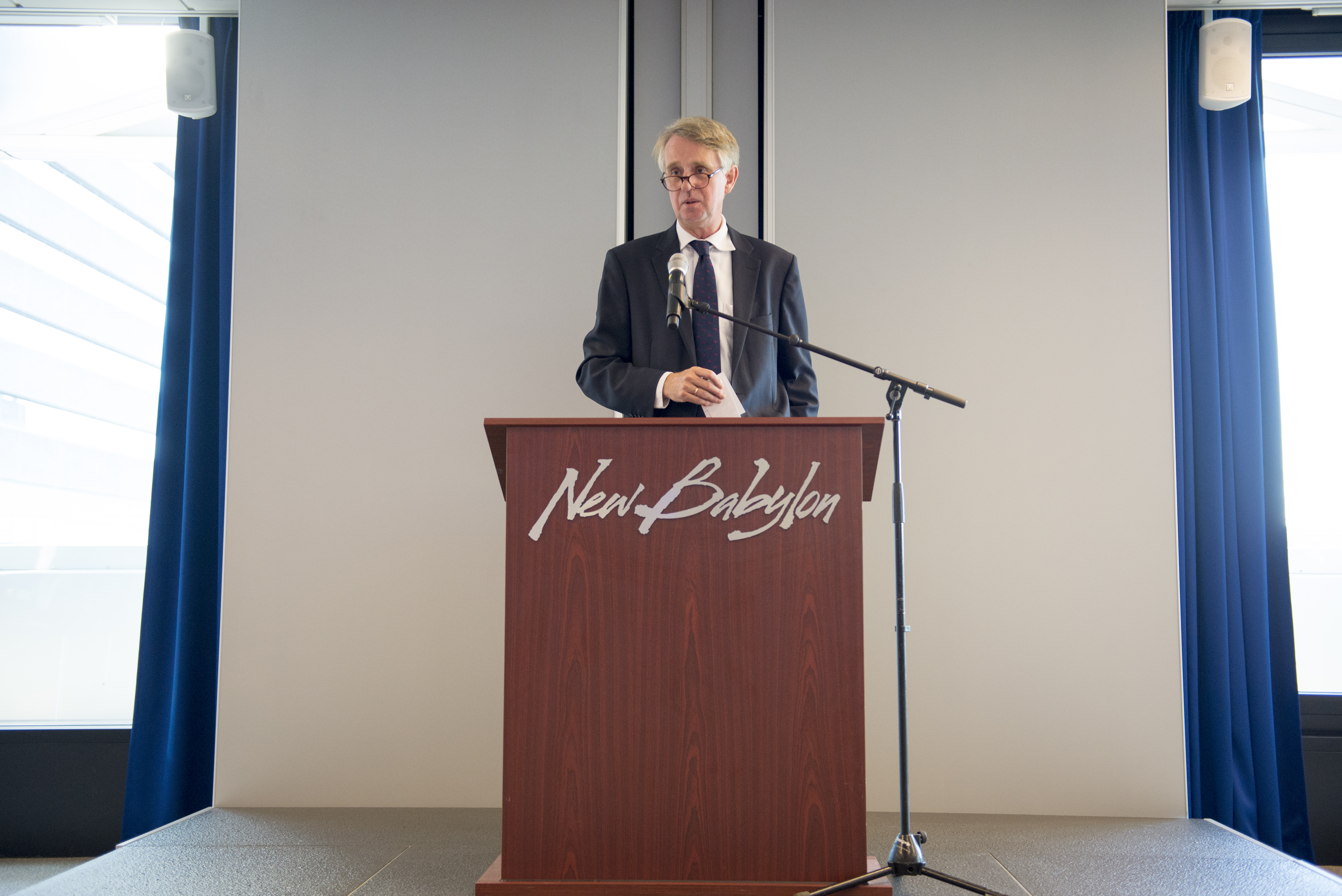
Benschop in 2016, while speaking at an event of the Ministry of Foreign Affairs

Benschop is a supporter of the Third Way, a political position combining social democratic and liberal policies, which was championed internationally by British prime minister Tony Blair, German chancellor Gerhard Schröder, and US president Bill Clinton. He contrasted himself with more left-wing Labour Party members, saying in the late 1990s that "policies directed against the business community are not in the interest of the Netherlands." Following his party's significant seat loss in the 2002 general election, Benschop said that voters had expected improvements in government services such as education and healthcare. He added that the optimism of the 1990s had faded because of economic hardship and the September 11 attacks. According to Benschop, the Third Way had underdeveloped ideas concerning public sector reform, and it fell short in addressing new uncertainties, including migration, security, and national identity.

He is in favor of turning the mayoralty into an elected office. He added that the same idea appealed to him for the position of prime minister, but he said that the position is already indirectly filled through elections.

== Personal life ==
Benschop is married to Elisabeth Minnemann, a psychologist and chairwoman of The Hague University of Applied Sciences who was raised in Germany as the daughter of a Portuguese diplomat. They have two sons and one daughter, born in the late 1990s and early 2000s. Benschop resided in Badhoevedorp as state secretary, and he moved with his family to Malaysia when he worked for Shell. He later lived in The Hague, and he attended a Roman Catholic church as of 2025.

== Electoral history ==
Electoral history of Dick Benschop
Year	Body	Party	Pos.	Votes	Result		Ref.
Year	Body	Party	Pos.	Votes	Party seats	Individual	Ref.
1989	House of Representatives	Labour Party	7 (Note: Benschop was his party's 7th candidate in electoral district 9 (Amsterdam), and he did not appear on the ballot in other districts.)	122	49 / 150	Lost	
1994	House of Representatives	Labour Party	52	260	37 / 150	Lost	
2002	House of Representatives	Labour Party	7	5,768	23 / 150	Won	

== Notes ==
Political offices
Preceded by Michiel Patijn	State Secretary for European Affairs; 1998–2002	Succeeded by Atzo Nicolaï
Business positions
Preceded by Peter de Wit	President-director of Shell Netherlands; 2011–2015	Succeeded by Marjan van Loon
Preceded by Jos Nijhuis	CEO of Royal Schiphol Group; 2018–2022	Succeeded by Ruud Sondag
