= Jos Nijhuis =

Jos Nijhuis (born 21 June 1957 in Utrecht) is a Dutch businessman, and the former Chief Executive of Schiphol Group, which runs Schiphol Airport.

== Life and career ==
In 1978 he gained qualifications from a Hoger Economisch en Administratief Onderwijs Bedrijfseconomie.

Since 1 January 2009 he has been Chief Executive of the Schiphol Group, replacing Gerlach Cerfontaine. On May 1, 2018, he has been succeeded by Dick Benschop as CEO.

== Personal life ==
He is married with three children in their twenties.

Business positions
Preceded by Gerlach Cerfontaine	Chief Executive of Schiphol Group; January 2009 - May 2018	Succeeded by Dick Benschop
