= Michiel Patijn =

Dutch politician

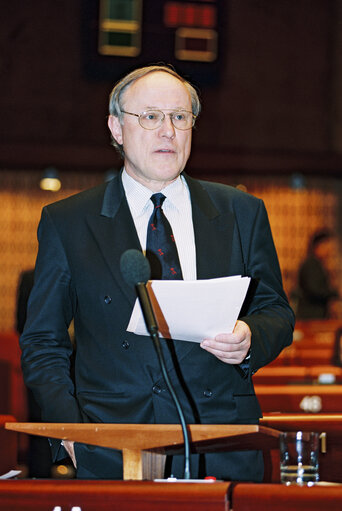
- Patijn in 1997

Permanent Representative of the Netherlands to NATO
- In office 1 April 2001 – 1 May 2005
- Preceded by: Nicolaas Hendrik Biegman
- Succeeded by: Unknown

Member of the House of Representatives
- In office 19 May 1998 – 1 April 2001

State Secretary for Foreign Affairs
- In office 22 August 1994 – 3 August 1998
- Prime Minister: Wim Kok
- Preceded by: Piet Dankert
- Succeeded by: Dick Benschop

Personal details
- Born: Michiel Patijn; 19 August 1942 (age 84) The Hague, Netherlands
- Party: People's Party for Freedom and Democracy (from 1982)
- Other political affiliations: Labour Party (1963–1978)
- Parent: Connie Patijn (father)
- Relatives: Schelto Patijn (brother)
- Education: Leiden University
- Occupation: Politician · diplomat · civil servant

Michiel Patijn (born 19 August 1942) is a retired Dutch politician and diplomat of the People's Party for Freedom and Democracy (VVD).

== Decorations ==
Honours
Ribbon bar	Honour	Country	Date	Comment
	Knight of the Order of Orange-Nassau	Netherlands	30 October 1998	

Civic offices
Preceded by Gerard Peijnenburg	Secretary-General of the Ministry of Defence; 1989–1994	Succeeded by Dirk Barth
Political offices
Preceded by Piet Dankert	State Secretary for Foreign Affairs; 1994–1998	Succeeded by Dick Benschop
Diplomatic posts
Unknown	Permanent Representative of the Netherlands to NATO; 2001–2005	Unknown
