= Amsterdam Airport Schiphol =

Major airport in the Netherlands

Amsterdam Airport Schiphol Luchthaven Schiphol

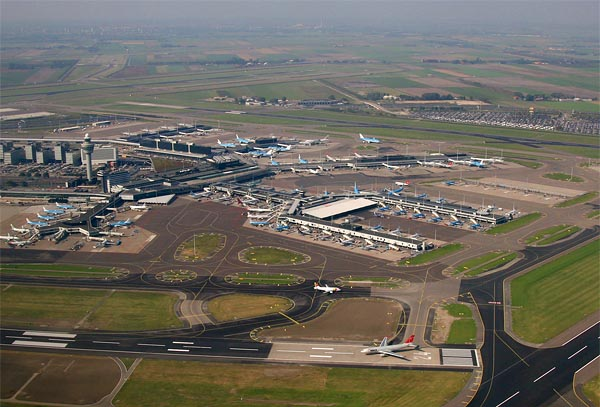
- Aerial view of the airport
- IATA: AMS; ICAO: EHAM; WMO: 06240

Summary
- Airport type: Public
- Owner/Operator: Royal Schiphol Group
- Serves: Greater Amsterdam
- Location: Haarlemmermeer, Netherlands
- Opened: 19 September 1916; 110 years ago
- Hub for: KLM; KLM Cityhopper; Martinair
- Operating base for: Corendon Dutch Airlines; easyJet; Transavia; TUI fly Netherlands; Vueling
- Elevation AMSL: −3 m (−9.8 ft)
- Coordinates: 52°18′00″N 4°45′54″E
- Public transit access: Train, bus
- Website: www.schiphol.nl

Maps
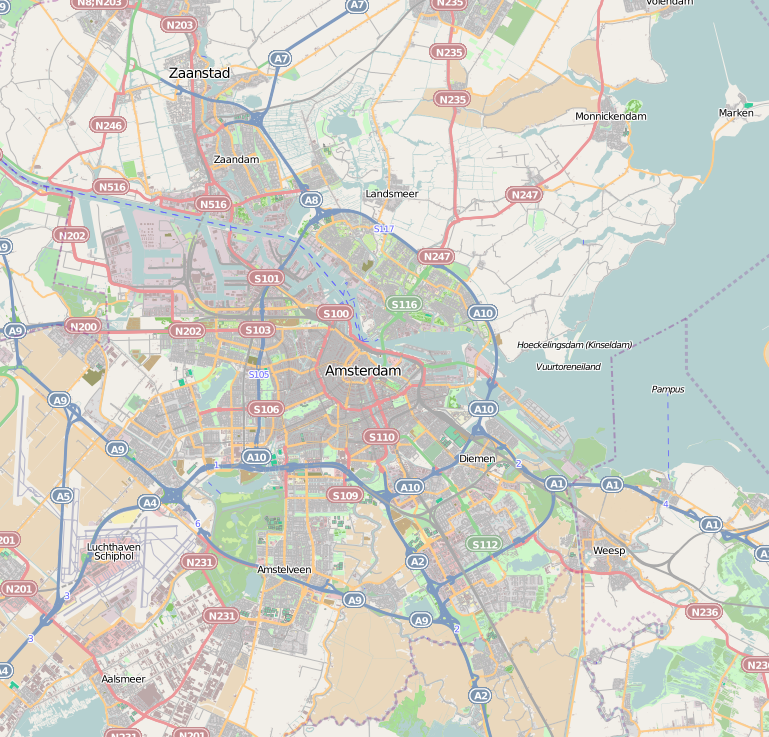
- Location within Greater Amsterdam Location in North Holland Location in the Netherlands Location in Europe
- Interactive map of Amsterdam Airport Schiphol

Runways
Direction	Length		Surface
Direction	m	ft	Surface
04/22 (Note: Common name: 'Oostbaan')	2,014	6,608	Asphalt
06/24 (Note: Common name: 'Kaagbaan')	3,500	11,483	Asphalt
09/27 (Note: Common name: 'Buitenveldertbaan')	3,453	11,329	Asphalt
18L/36R (Note: Common name: 'Aalsmeerbaan')	3,400	11,155	Asphalt
18C/36C (Note: Common name: 'Zwanenburgbaan')	3,300	10,827	Asphalt
18R/36L (Note: Common name: 'Polderbaan')	3,800	12,467	Asphalt

Statistics (2025)
- Passengers: 68,767,548
- Aircraft movements: 477,552
- Freight (tonnes): 1,428,860
- Economic contribution (2023): €11.8 billion in direct and supplier value added
- Land area: 2,787 ha
- Sources: Airports Council International, CBS, Royal Schiphol Group and AIP

Amsterdam Airport Schiphol (IATA: AMS, ICAO: EHAM), known informally as Schiphol Airport, (Note: Pronounced SKIP-(h)oll /ˈskɪp(h)ɒl/; Dutch: Luchthaven Schiphol, pronounced [ˌlʏxtɦaːvə(n) ˈsxɪp(ɦ)ɔl, - sxɪpˈɦɔl].) is the main international airport of the Netherlands. It is located 9 kilometres (5.6 mi; 4.9 nmi) southwest of Amsterdam, in the municipality of Haarlemmermeer in the province of North Holland.

In 2025, it was the world's fifth-busiest airport by international passenger traffic. With 68.8 million passengers, it was the fourth-busiest airport in Europe in terms of passenger volume and the third-busiest in terms of air transport movements. With 1.43 million tonnes of cargo, it was the fifth-busiest in Europe by cargo volume in 2025.

Schiphol Airport covers a total area of 2,787 hectares (6,887 acres) of land. The airport is built on the single-terminal concept: one large terminal split into three departure halls.

Schiphol is the principal hub for KLM and its regional affiliate KLM Cityhopper, as well as for Martinair. The airport also serves as an operating base for Corendon Dutch Airlines, easyJet, Transavia, TUI fly Netherlands, and Vueling.

Schiphol began operating as a military airfield on 19 September 1916. The end of the First World War also saw the beginning of civilian use of Schiphol Airport, and the airport eventually lost its military role completely. By 1940, Schiphol had four asphalt runways at 45-degree angles. The airport was captured by the German military that same year and renamed Fliegerhorst Schiphol. The airport was destroyed by bombing, but at the end of the war, the airfield was soon rebuilt. In 1949, it was decided that Schiphol was to become the primary airport of the Netherlands.

== Description ==
A record 71,706,999 passengers passed through Schiphol in 2019. Passenger traffic subsequently fell sharply during the COVID-19 pandemic and had not returned to the 2019 record by 2025, when the airport handled 68.8 million passengers.

Schiphol was connected to 300 destinations worldwide in 2025. Connecting traffic forms a substantial part of its passenger traffic: 36.6% of recorded passengers in 2025 were transfer passengers, while 43.6 million passengers had Schiphol as their airport of origin or destination. In Schiphol's traffic statistics, transfer passengers are counted both on arrival and on departure on their connecting flight.

The airport is built around a single-terminal concept, with one terminal complex divided into three departure halls that are connected airside. The terminal and piers have been expanded and renovated repeatedly as passenger traffic and aircraft requirements have changed.

A new pier, Pier A, is under construction and is expected to enter service in April 2027. The pier will have eight gates, including three capable of handling the largest aircraft types. Schiphol's longer-term master plan includes a new Terminal South and the phased renovation of Piers B, C, D and H/M, while retaining the single-terminal concept.

== History ==
=== Origins and early years ===
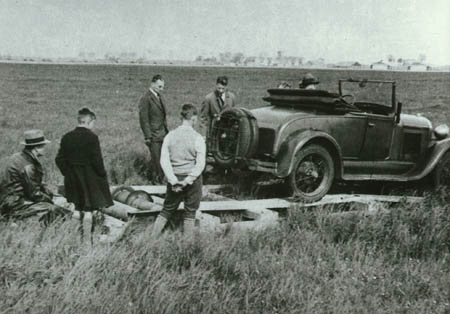
A Ford being used to power a winch for towing gliders at Schiphol in 1933

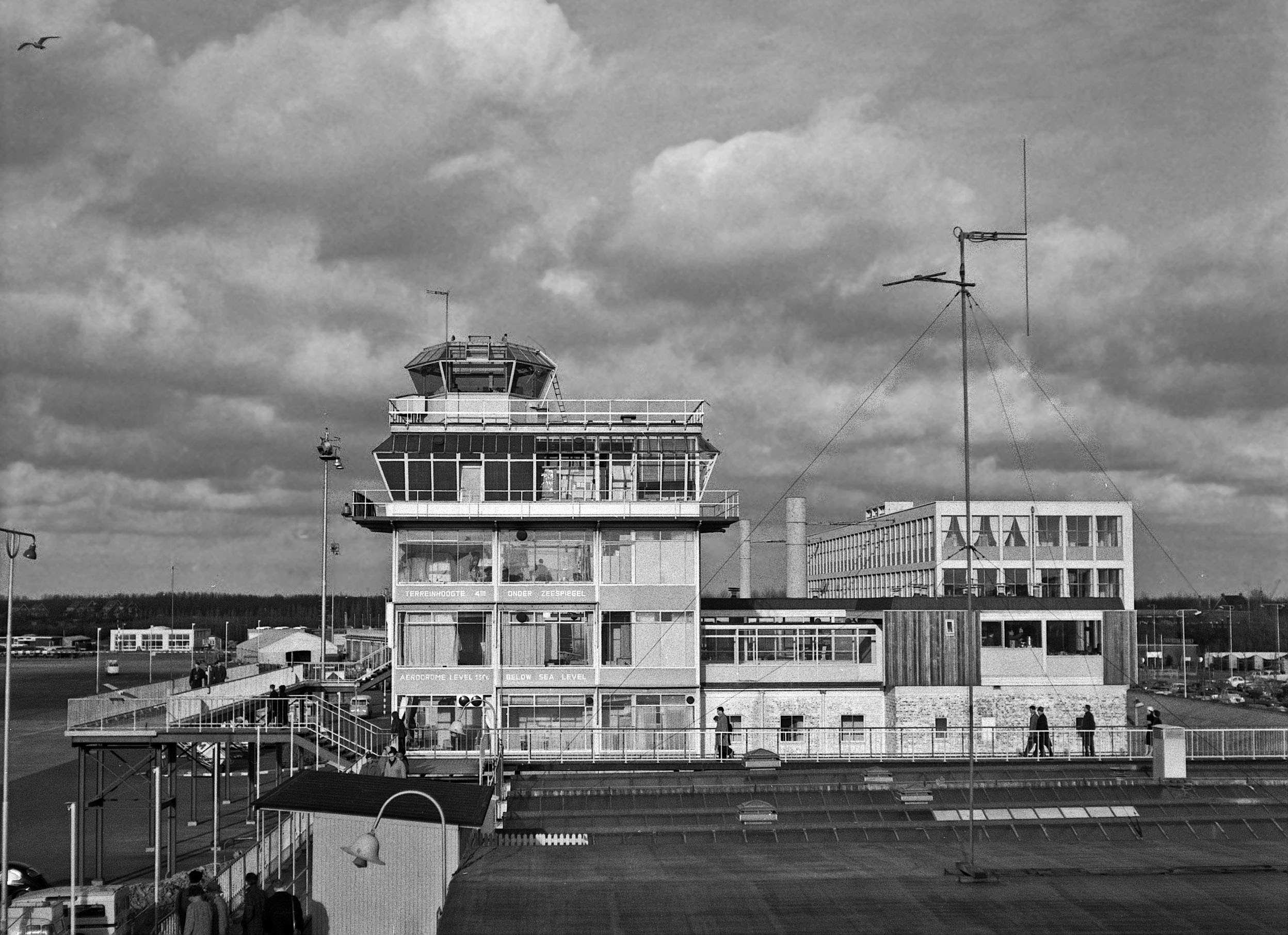
The air traffic control tower at Schiphol in 1960

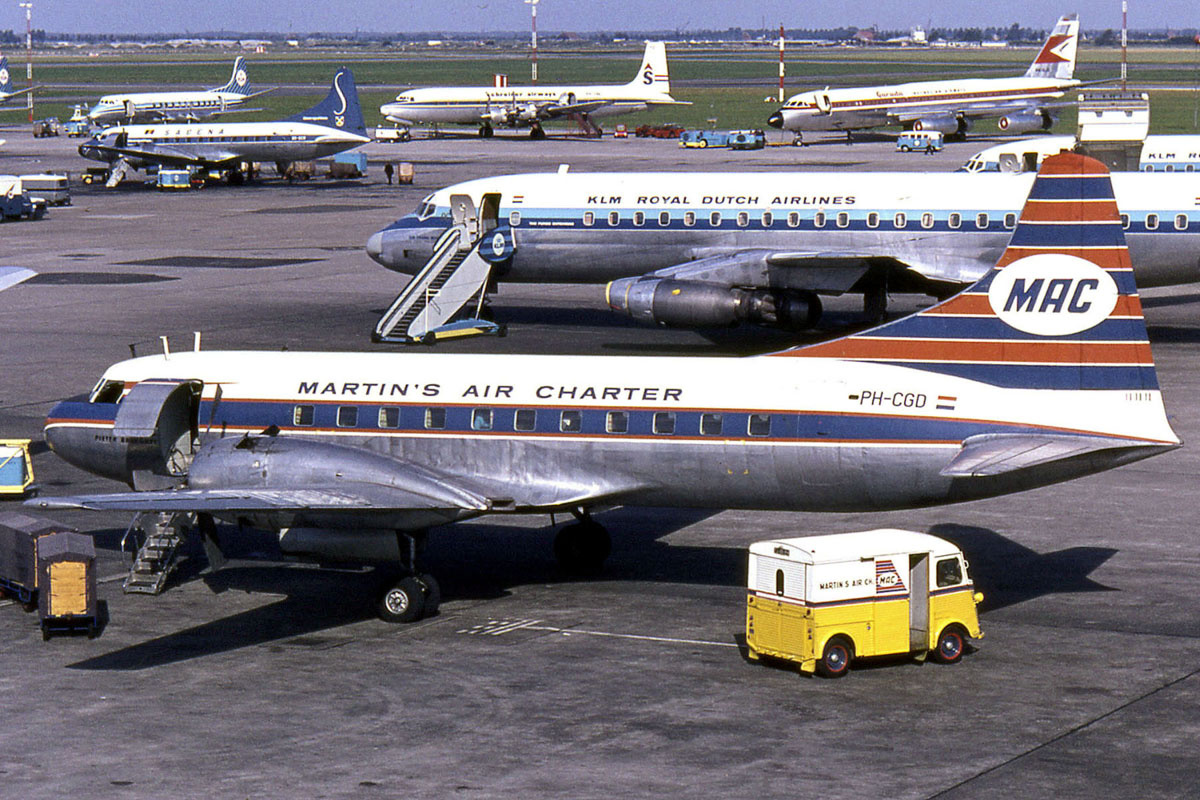
Airplanes and service vehicles on the apron in 1965

The name Schiphol predates the airport by several centuries. It is recorded as Sciphol in 1447, in a description of land in the jurisdiction of Aalsmeer. Its precise etymology is uncertain.

Dutch linguist and toponymist Moritz Schönfeld associated the name with the local Schipholsloot. He noted that Middle Dutch hol could denote the depth or bed of a ditch or watercourse, and that the adjective hol could also mean low-lying or marshy. Schönfeld described the name as passing from the local settlement to Fort Schiphol and subsequently to the airfield. Maas later considered two analyses of Schiphol possible: if divided into separate elements, hol may refer to low-lying, marshy terrain; alternatively, the name may have described a hollow parcel of land by comparison with a scheepshol, the interior or hull of a ship.

Several other explanations have circulated. B. J. Hekket proposed that schip in place-names could carry a meaning such as "branches" or "timber", an interpretation he also applied to Schiphol. Maas rejected this derivation, finding no evidence that schip had ever carried the proposed meaning and describing Hekket's interpretation of the Scandinavian linguistic evidence as incorrect. Popular accounts have also associated the name with ships supposedly lost in the former Haarlemmermeer and with scheepshaal, referring to the hauling of ships between bodies of water. These explanations are not established by the specialist etymological sources cited above.

Before the reclamation of the Haarlemmermeer, the site of the later airport lay beside the lake and partly within the area subsequently reclaimed from it.

After the lake was dredged in the mid-1800s, a fortification named Fort Schiphol was built in the area, which was part of the Stelling van Amsterdam defence works.

Schiphol was established in 1916 as a military airfield; the first military aircraft landed there on 19 September of that year. Scheduled civil aviation began on 17 May 1920, when KLM's inaugural service from London landed at Schiphol. In its early years the airfield was unpaved and frequently muddy. French pilots consequently nicknamed it Schiphol-les-Bains ("Schiphol bathing resort").

The Fokker aircraft manufacturer established its Dutch factory in Amsterdam-Noord in 1919, rather than at Schiphol. A Fokker hangar was built at Schiphol in 1924, where aircraft manufactured in Amsterdam could be assembled and operated. Military use of Schiphol continued alongside the developing civil airport until 1923, when the military left the airfield.

By 1940, Schiphol had four asphalt runways at 45-degree angles, all 1,020 m (3,350 ft) or less. One was extended to become today's runway 04/22; two others crossed that runway at 52.312°N 4.800°E. The airport was captured by the German military that same year and renamed Fliegerhorst Schiphol. A large number of anti-aircraft defences were installed in the vicinity of the airport, and fake decoy airfields were constructed in the vicinity near Bennebroek, Vijfhuizen, and Vogelenzang to try to confuse Allied bombers. A railway connection was also built. Despite these defences, the airfield was still bombed intensively; an exceptionally heavy attack on 13 December 1943 caused so much damage that it rendered the airfield unusable as an active base. After that, it served only as an emergency landing field until the Germans themselves destroyed the remnants of the airfield at the start of Operation Market Garden. At the end of the war, the airfield was quickly restored: the first aircraft, a Douglas DC-3, landed on 8 July 1945.

A new terminal building was completed in 1949, and it was decided that Schiphol was to become the primary airport of the Netherlands. The expansion came at the cost of a small town called Rijk, which was demolished to make room for the growing airport. The name of this town is remembered in the name of the present Schiphol-Rijk industrial estate. In 1967, Schiphol expanded even further with a new terminal area at its current location. Most of the 1967 terminal is still in use today (Departure Halls 1 and 2), as are parts of the original piers (now called C, D, and E). Dutch designer Benno Wissing created signage for Schiphol Airport, well known for its clear writing and thorough colour-coding; to avoid confusion, he prohibited any other signage in the shades of yellow and green used. The new terminal building replaced the older facilities once located on what is now the east side of the airport. The A-pier (now C-pier) of the airport was modified in 1970 to allow Boeing 747 aircraft to use the boarding gates. A new pier (D, now called F) opened in 1977, dedicated to handling wide-body aircraft. The first railway station at the airport was opened in 1978.

=== Development since the 1990s ===
Airport map

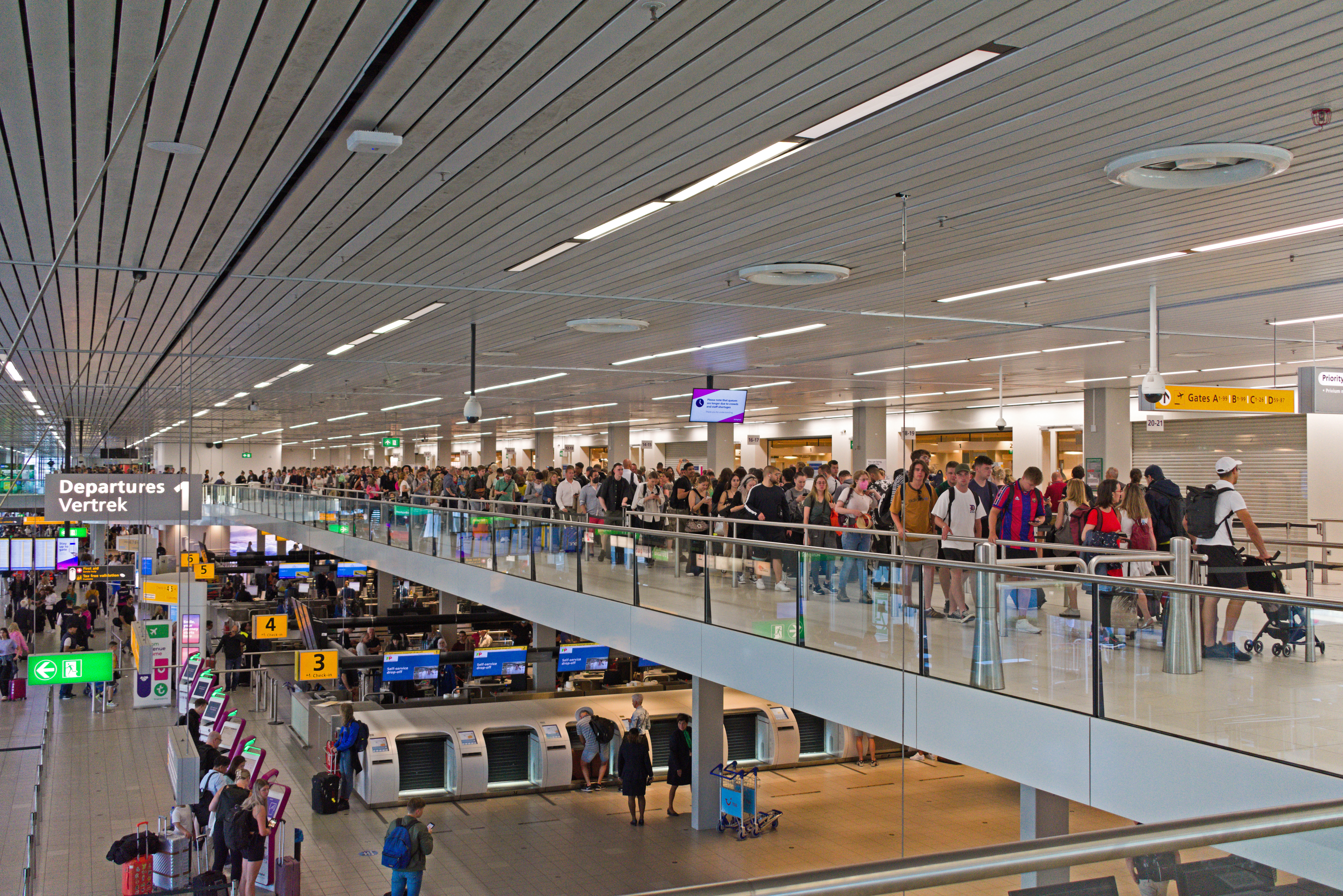
Queues to the security control in June 2022

The construction of a new air traffic control tower was completed in 1991, as the existing tower could no longer oversee all of the airport, as it was further expanded. Departure Hall 3 was added to the terminal in 1993, as was another pier, G-pier. New wayfinding signage was designed that year as well by Paul Mijksenaar. A sixth runway was completed at quite some distance west of the rest of airport in 2003 and was nicknamed the Polderbaan, with the connecting taxiway bridge crossing the A5 motorway. The distance of this runway means that taxiing to and from this runway can take between 10 and 20 minutes. It also required the construction of an additional air traffic control tower, as the primary tower is too far away to oversee this part of the airfield.

On 25 February 2005, a diamond robbery occurred at Schiphol's cargo terminal. The thieves used a stolen KLM van to gain airside access. The estimated value of the stones was around 75 million euros, making it one of the largest diamond robberies ever.

Later in 2005, a fire broke out at the airport's detention centre, killing 11 people and injuring 15. The complex was holding 350 people at the time of the incident. Results from the investigation almost one year later showed that fire safety precautions were not in force. The investigation led to the resignation of Justice Minister Piet Hein Donner (CDA) and Haarlemmermeer mayor Fons Hertog. Spatial Planning Minister Sybilla Dekker (VVD) resigned as well because she bore responsibility for safety failings cited in the report.

As passenger traffic recovered from the impact of the COVID-19 pandemic on commercial air transport in 2022, Schiphol experienced severe operational disruption amid shortages of security and other airport staff. Long queues developed, flights were cancelled and the airport imposed limits on the number of departing passengers during the summer because of the shortage of security staff. Schiphol Group chief executive Dick Benschop resigned in September 2022 amid the disruption.

In 2024, Schiphol saw an 8% increase in passenger traffic and an 8.2% rise in cargo volume compared to 2023. Also in 2024, Royal Schiphol Group announced a €6 billion infrastructure investment plan, the largest in the airport's history. Planned improvements included the renovations of Pier C, Lounge 1, the baggage system, and passenger walkways, lifts, and bridges. The Lounge 1 expansion was completed by November 2024, with 5,000 square meters of additional passenger space and a new plaza.

== Infrastructure ==
=== Terminal ===
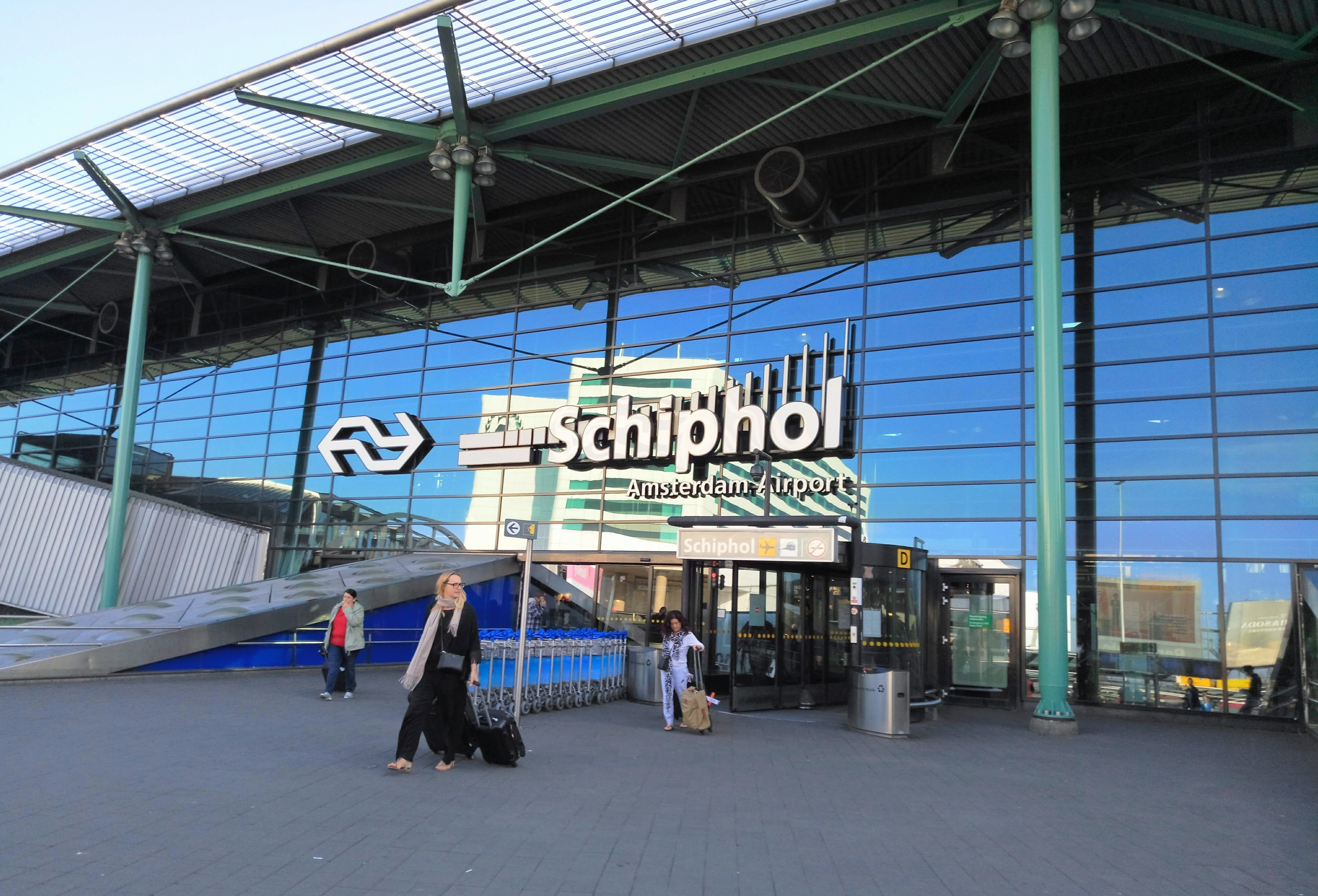
The main entrance of Amsterdam Airport Schiphol

Lounge 2, used for international flights

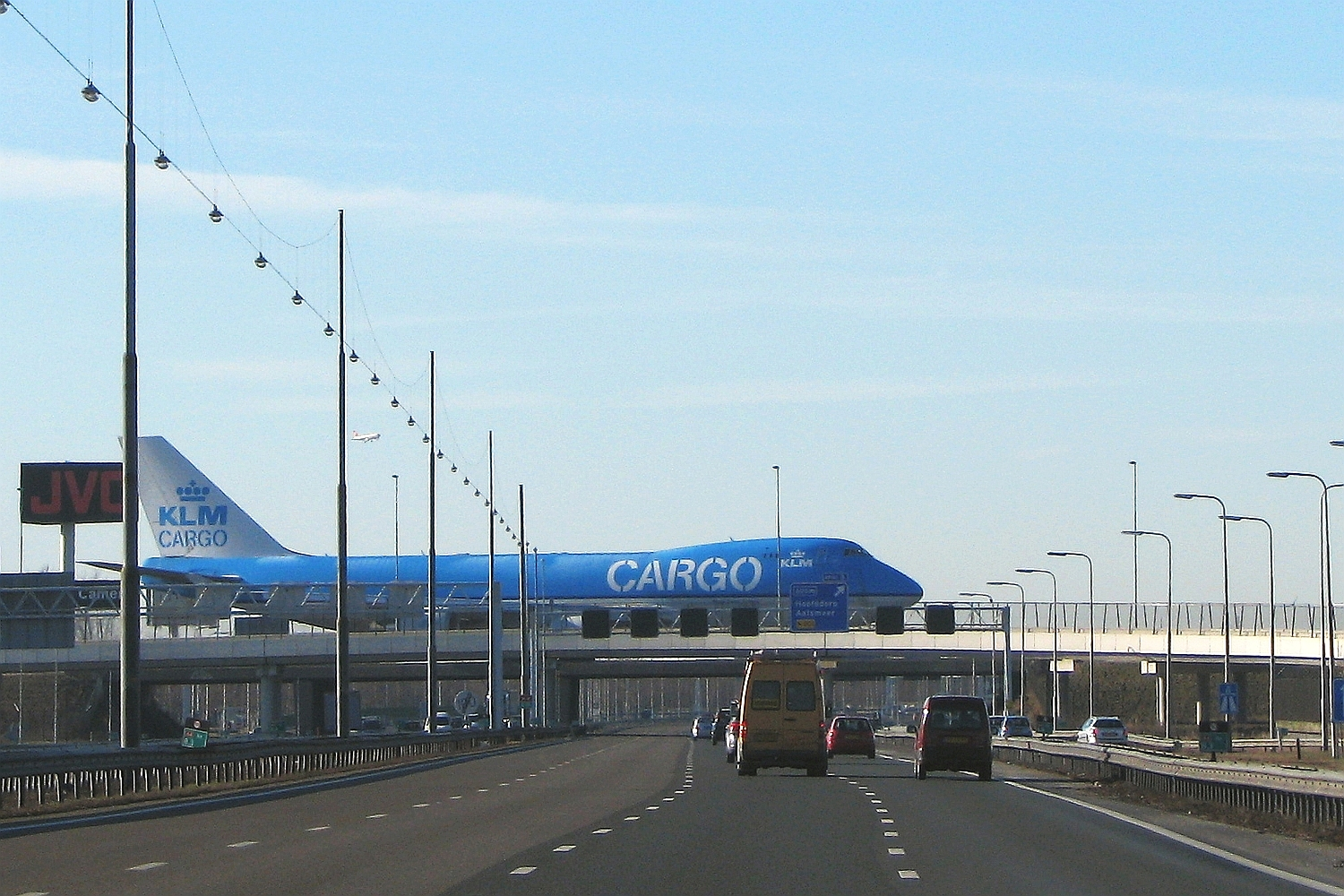
KLM Cargo Boeing 747-400ERF on the taxiway bridge crossing the highway A4/E19

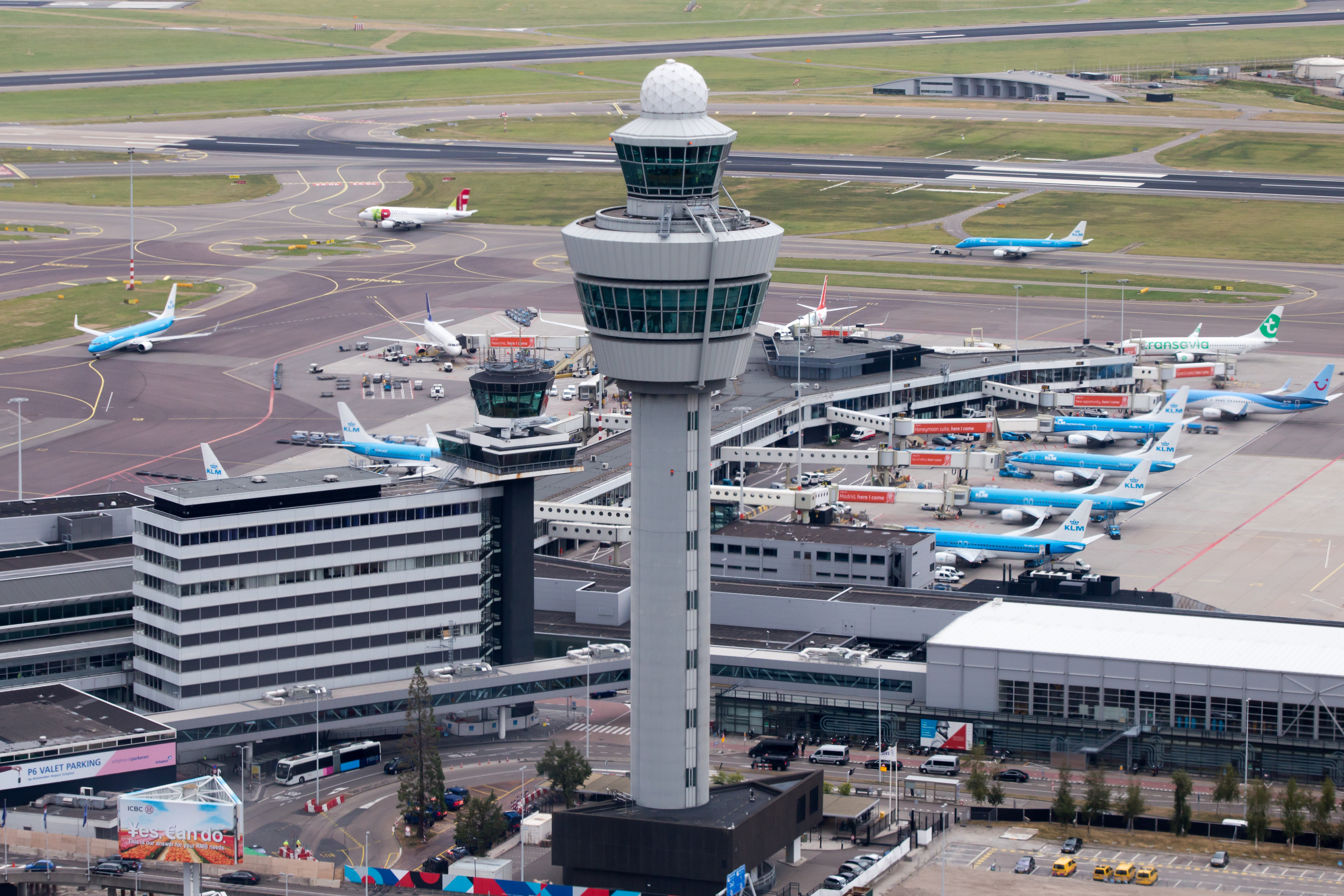
Schiphol control tower

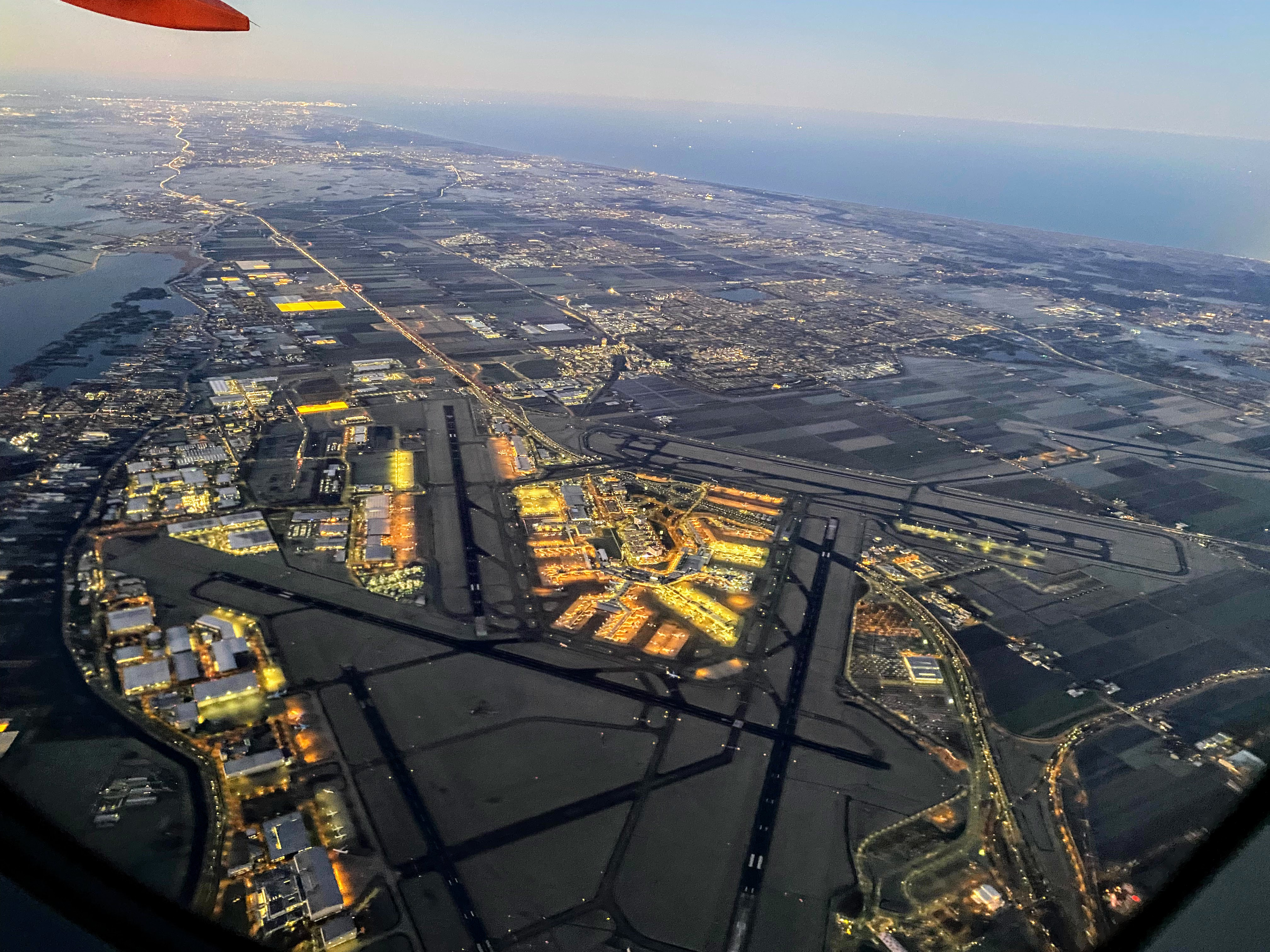
All the airport's six runways viewed from an airplane taking off at dawn

Schiphol uses a one-terminal concept, where all facilities are located under a single roof, radiating from the central plaza, Schiphol Plaza. The terminal is divided into three sections or halls designated 1, 2, and 3. The piers and concourses of each hall are connected so that it is possible, on both sides of security or border inspection, to walk between piers and halls, although border control separates Schengen from non-Schengen areas. The exception to this is the low-cost pier M: once airside (past security), passengers cannot access any other areas.

In 2025, Schiphol had 227 aircraft stands, of which 91 were connected to the terminal and 136 were remote stands. The airport adopted a distinctive design, with the second jetway extending over the aircraft wing, hanging from a steel cantilever structure. Gradual refurbishments have seen these jetways replaced with a more conventional layout, with the last two taken out of use in November 2024. Three gates have been modified to accommodate the Airbus A380. Emirates was the first airline to operate scheduled Airbus A380 services to Schiphol, beginning in August 2012. China Southern Airlines also operated the type on its Beijing–Amsterdam route before retiring its A380 fleet at the end of 2022. Emirates currently operates the A380 at Schiphol twice daily.

Notable public artworks in the airport include the Schiphol clock by Maarten Baas, in which a man behind a translucent screen appears to paint the minutes of an analog clock by hand.

==== Departure halls and piers ====
The terminal has three main departure halls. Departure Hall 1 primarily serves Schengen flights and provides access to Piers B and C and gates D59–D87. Departure Halls 2 and 3 serve a mixture of other piers and gates, with passenger and check-in allocation varying according to factors including terminal capacity, baggage-handling capacity and ground handler.

Piers B, C and M are used for Schengen traffic, while E, F, G and H are primarily used for non-Schengen traffic; Pier D can handle both through separate passenger levels. Three gates, G9, E18 and E24, can accommodate the Airbus A380.

==== General aviation terminal ====
A new general aviation terminal was opened in 2011 on the east side of the airport, operated as the KLM Jet Center. The new terminal building has a floorspace of 6,000 m^{2} (65,000 sq ft); 1,000 m^{2} (11,000 sq ft) for the actual terminal and lounges, 4,000 m^{2} (43,000 sq ft) for office space and 1,000 m^{2} (11,000 sq ft) for parking.

The centre and its activities were sold to Swiss aviation services company Jet Aviation in October 2018 and now operate as Jet Aviation Amsterdam.

==== Other facilities ====
From 2002 to 2024, the Rijksmuseum operated an annex at Schiphol, making it the first airport in the world to house an art museum. The airside gallery presented rotating exhibitions of works from the Rijksmuseum collection.

In the summer of 2010, Schiphol Airport Library opened alongside the museum, providing passengers access to a collection of 1,200 books (translated into 29 languages) by Dutch authors on subjects relating to the country's history and culture. The 89.9 m^{2} (968 sq ft) library offers e-books and music by Dutch artists and composers that can be downloaded free of charge to a laptop or mobile device.

For aviation enthusiasts, Amsterdam Airport Schiphol has a large rooftop viewing area, called the Panoramaterras. It is not accessible to connecting passengers unless they first exit the airport. Enthusiasts and the public can enter, free of charge, from the airport's landside. Since June 2011, it has been the location for a KLM Cityhopper Fokker 100, modified to be a viewing exhibit. Besides the Panoramaterras, Schiphol has other spotting sites, especially along the newest Polderbaan runway and at the McDonald's restaurant at the north side of the airport.

Schiphol has its own mortuary, where the dead can be handled and kept before departure or after arrival.

Between October 2006 and 2019, people could also hold a wedding ceremony at Schiphol.

=== Development projects ===
Royal Schiphol Group is carrying out a long-term programme to renew and expand the airport's infrastructure. In 2025, the group presented plans to invest around €10 billion through 2035, with most of the investment intended for Schiphol itself. The Schiphol Centre Master Plan includes a new Terminal South and the phased renewal of existing piers, while retaining the airport's single-terminal concept.

==== Pier A ====
A new Pier A is under construction south-west of the existing terminal complex. The project has been delayed repeatedly; the pier had originally been expected to open around 2019, but construction problems and a dispute with the previous contractors led to further delays and repair work. It is now expected to enter service in April 2027. The 55,000 m^{2} (590,000 sq ft) pier will have eight gates, three of which can accommodate the largest aircraft types. Its estimated cost had risen to almost €1.4 billion by 2024.

==== Southern Development ====
The airport's longer-term plans include a new Terminal South. Preparatory work in the southern part of the terminal area includes construction of a new baggage basement and baggage-handling system, which will allow older baggage systems to be replaced while the airport remains in operation. The new baggage basement is being designed so that a terminal could be constructed above it in the future; the terminal itself remains a future development rather than a completed or operational project.

==== Public transport infrastructure ====
Schiphol Airport's train and bus interchange is being redeveloped as the Multimodal Hub Schiphol, a joint project involving the airport, the Ministry of Infrastructure and Water Management, Haarlemmermeer municipality, the Amsterdam Transport Authority, NS and ProRail. The project includes additional access between the railway platforms and the bus station and a replacement bus station, which is expected to be completed in autumn 2027.

=== Tower ===
The Schiphol air traffic control tower, with a height of 101 m (331 ft), was the tallest in the world when constructed in 1991.

Schiphol lies approximately 4.5 metres (15 ft) below sea level.

=== Runways ===
Schiphol has six runways, one of which is used mainly by general aviation. The airport covers a total area of 2,787 hectares (6,887 acres) of land.

Number	Runway direction/code	Length	Width	Common name	Namesake	Surface	Notes
1	18R/36L	3,800 m 12,467 ft	60 m 197 ft	Polderbaan	Decided via contest. Polder is the Dutch word for land reclaimed from a body of water. Schiphol Airport is situated in a polder.	Asphalt	Newest runway, opened in 2003. Own control tower. Located to reduce the noise impact on the surrounding population. Takeoffs only northbound and landings only southbound. The nearest end is located 5 km (3.1 mi) from the terminal building, and aircraft have a 10 to 20-minute taxi to and from the terminal.
2	06/24	3,500 m 11,483 ft	45 m 148 ft	Kaagbaan	Named after Kaag, a small village which lies beyond the southwest end of the runway.	Asphalt	Opened in 1960. The Kaagbaan offered a location for spotters until the spotting location was closed in January 2008.
3	09/27	3,453 m 11,329 ft	45 m 148 ft	Buitenveldertbaan	Named after Buitenveldert, a neighbourhood of Amsterdam that lies under its approach.	Asphalt	Opened in 1967. El Al Flight 1862 was trying to make an emergency landing on this runway when it crashed into a block of flats in the Bijlmermeer.
4	18L/36R	3,400 m 11,155 ft	45 m 148 ft	Aalsmeerbaan	Named after the town of Aalsmeer which lies beyond the end of the runway.	Asphalt	Opened in 1950.
5	18C/36C	3,300 m 10,826 ft	45 m 148 ft	Zwanenburgbaan	Named after the village of Zwanenburg that lies under its approach.	Asphalt	Opened in 1968. El Al Flight 1862 took off from this runway before crashing into flats in the Bijlmermeer when the plane was trying to return to the airport.
6	04/22	2,014 m 6,608 ft	45 m 148 ft	Oostbaan	Most eastern of all runways ("oost" is Dutch for "east").	Asphalt	Opened in 1945. Primarily used for general aviation traffic. In October 2010 a Boeing 737–400 of Corendon Airlines overran the short runway and ended up with its nosegear in the mud.

== Airlines and destinations ==
=== Passenger ===
The following airlines operate regular scheduled and charter flights to and from Amsterdam:

Airlines	Destinations
Aegean Airlines	Athens
Aer Lingus	Dublin
Aeroméxico	Mexico City–Benito Juárez
Air Anka	Seasonal charter: Antalya
Air Arabia	Fès, Nador, Tangier, Tétouan
Air Astana	Atyrau
Air Canada	Toronto–Pearson; Seasonal: Montréal–Trudeau
Air Dolomiti	Munich
Air Europa	Madrid
Air France	Lyon, Paris–Charles de Gaulle, Toulouse
Air India	Delhi
Air Serbia	Belgrade
Air Transat	Seasonal: Toronto–Pearson
airBaltic	Palanga, Riga, Tallinn, Vilnius
AJet	Ankara, Istanbul–Sabiha Gökçen
Amelia International	Strasbourg
American Airlines	New York–JFK (begins 29 March 2027), Philadelphia; Seasonal: Dallas/Fort Worth
Arkia	Tel Aviv
Austrian Airlines	Vienna; Seasonal: Innsbruck
Bluebird Airways	Tel Aviv
British Airways	London–City, London–Heathrow
Bulgaria Air	Sofia
Cathay Pacific	Hong Kong
China Airlines	Taipei–Taoyuan
China Eastern Airlines	Shanghai–Pudong
China Southern Airlines	Beijing–Daxing, Guangzhou
Corendon Airlines	Izmir
Corendon Dutch Airlines	Antalya, Bonaire, Curaçao, Gran Canaria, Hurghada, Seasonal: Gazipaşa, Heraklion, Kos, Malaga, Mytilene, Palma de Mallorca, Preveza, Rhodes, Samos, Zakynthos
Croatia Airlines	Zagreb
Delta Air Lines	Atlanta, Boston, Detroit, Minneapolis/St Paul, New York–JFK, Salt Lake City, Seattle/Tacoma, Tampa; Seasonal: Orlando
easyJet	Alicante, Basel/Mulhouse, Belfast–International, Berlin, Birmingham, Bristol, Copenhagen, Edinburgh, Faro, Funchal, Geneva, Glasgow, Kraków, Larnaca, Lisbon, Liverpool, London–Gatwick, London–Luton, London–Southend, London–Stansted, Málaga, Manchester, Milan–Linate, Milan–Malpensa, Naples, Newcastle upon Tyne, Nice, Prague, Sal (begins 27 October 2026), Seville, Southampton, Thessaloniki, Valencia, Venice; Seasonal: Chania, Corfu, Harstad/Narvik, Hurghada, Ibiza, Malta, Marrakech, Olbia, Palermo, Palma de Mallorca, Pula, Rhodes, Rovaniemi, Salzburg, Sharm El Sheikh, Split, Tenerife–South, Tivat (begins 29 June 2027), Tromsø
Egyptair	Cairo
El Al	Tel Aviv
Emirates	Dubai–International
Etihad Airways	Abu Dhabi
EVA Air	Taipei–Taoyuan (Note: Taipei–Taoyuan is the continuation of Bangkok–Suvarnabhumi flights as the same flight number)
Finnair	Helsinki
FlyOne	Chișinău
FlyOne Armenia	Yerevan
Garuda Indonesia	Jakarta–Soekarno-Hatta
Georgian Airways	Tbilisi
Iberia Express	Madrid
Icelandair	Reykjavík–Keflavík
IndiGo	Mumbai-Shivaji
ITA Airways	Milan–Linate, Rome–Fiumicino
JetBlue	Seasonal: Boston
Kenya Airways	Nairobi–Jomo Kenyatta
KLM	Aalborg, Aberdeen, Accra, Ålesund, Alicante, Aruba, Athens, Atlanta, Austin, Bangkok–Suvarnabhumi, Barcelona, Basel/Mulhouse, Beijing–Capital, Belfast–City, Belgrade, Bengaluru, Bergen, Berlin, Bilbao, Billund, Birmingham, Bogotá, Bologna, Bonaire, Bordeaux, Boston, Bremen, Bristol, Brussels, Bucharest–Otopeni, Budapest, Buenos Aires–Ezeiza, Calgary, Cape Town, Cardiff, Cartagena, Catania, Chicago–O'Hare, Copenhagen, Cork, Curaçao, Dammam, Dar es Salaam, Delhi, Denpasar, (Note: Denpasar is the continuation of Singapore flights as the same flight number) Dubai–International, Dublin, Düsseldorf, Edinburgh, Edmonton, Entebbe, Exeter, Florence, Frankfurt, Gdańsk, Geneva, Genoa, Georgetown–Cheddi Jagan, Glasgow, Gothenburg, Guayaquil, Hamburg, Hannover, Helsinki, Hong Kong, Houston–Intercontinental, Humberside, Hyderabad, Inverness, Istanbul, Jakarta–Soekarno-Hatta, (Note: Jakarta–Soekarno Hatta is the continuation of Kuala Lumpur–International flights as the same flight number) Johannesburg–O. R. Tambo, Kigali, Kilimanjaro, Kraków, Kristiansand, Kuala Lumpur–International, Lagos, Las Vegas, Leeds/Bradford, Lima, Linköping, Lisbon, Ljubljana, London–City, London–Heathrow, Los Angeles, Luxembourg, Lyon, Madrid, Málaga, Manchester, Manila, (Note: Manila is the continuation of Taipei–Taoyuan flights as the same flight number) Marseille, Mexico City–Benito Juárez, Miami, Milan–Linate, Montpellier, Montréal–Trudeau, Mumbai, Munich, Nairobi–Jomo Kenyatta, Nantes, Naples, New York–JFK, Newcastle upon Tyne, Nice, Norwich, Osaka–Kansai, Oslo, Panama City–Tocumen, Paramaribo, Paris–Charles de Gaulle, Port of Spain, Portland (OR), Porto, Poznań, Prague, Quito, Rennes, Rio de Janeiro–Galeão, Riyadh, Rome–Fiumicino, San Diego, San Francisco, San José (CR), Santiago de Chile, (Note: Santiago de Chile is the continuation of Buenos Aires–Ezeiza flights as the same flight number) São Paulo–Guarulhos, Seoul–Incheon, Shanghai–Pudong, Singapore, Sint Maarten, Southampton, Split, Stavanger, Stockholm–Arlanda, Stuttgart, Taipei–Taoyuan, Teesside, Tel Aviv, Tokyo–Narita, Toronto–Pearson, Toulouse, Trondheim, Turin, Valencia, Vancouver, Venice, Vienna, Warsaw–Chopin, Washington–Dulles, Wrocław, Zagreb, Zanzibar, Zurich; Seasonal: Asturias, Barbados, Biarritz, Cagliari, Cancún, Dubrovnik, Ibiza, Jersey, Kittilä, Minneapolis/St. Paul, Palma de Mallorca, Rovaniemi, Santiago de Compostela
KM Malta Airlines	Malta
Korean Air	Seoul–Incheon
Kuwait Airways	Kuwait City
LATAM Brasil	São Paulo–Guarulhos
LOT Polish Airlines	Warsaw–Chopin
Lufthansa	Frankfurt, Munich
Middle East Airlines	Beirut
Norwegian Air Shuttle	Copenhagen, Oslo, Stockholm–Arlanda
Oman Air	Muscat
Pegasus Airlines	Antalya, Istanbul–Sabiha Gökçen
Royal Air Maroc	Casablanca, Nador, Tangier; Seasonal: Al Hoceima, Oujda
Royal Jordanian	Amman–Queen Alia
Ryanair	Dublin, Málaga
Saudia	Jeddah
Scandinavian Airlines	Copenhagen, Oslo, Stockholm–Arlanda
Singapore Airlines	Singapore
Sky Express	Athens
SunExpress	Izmir; Seasonal: Adana/Mersin, Ankara
Surinam Airways	Paramaribo
Swiss International Air Lines	Zurich
Syrian Air	Damascus
TAP Air Portugal	Lisbon
Thai Airways International	Bangkok–Suvarnabhumi
Transavia	Agadir, Alicante, Amman–Queen Alia, Athens, Barcelona, Bari, Cairo, Casablanca, Catania, Faro, Fuerteventura, Funchal, Granada, Gran Canaria, Heraklion, Ibiza, Innsbruck, Lanzarote, La Palma, Larnaca, Lisbon, Ljubljana, Málaga, Marrakesh, Naples, Nice, Paris–Orly, Pisa, Porto, Rabat, Reykjavík–Keflavík, Salzburg, Seville, Skopje, Tbilisi, Tenerife–South, Thessaloniki, Tirana, Valencia; Seasonal: Alghero, Antalya, Chania, Corfu, Girona, Hurghada, Kalamata, Karpathos, Kefalonia, Kos, Marsa Alam, Menorca, Mykonos, Mytilene, Olbia, Palermo, Palma de Mallorca, Paphos, Ponta Delgada, Preveza, Pula (begins 2 June 2027), Rhodes, Samos, Santorini, Sharm El Sheikh, Skiathos, Split, Tromsø, Verona, Zakynthos
TUI fly Netherlands	Aruba, Banjul, Boa Vista, Bonaire, Cancún, Curaçao, Fuerteventura, Gran Canaria, Hurghada, Lanzarote, Montego Bay, Punta Cana, Sal, São Vicente, Tenerife–South; Seasonal: Antalya, Bodrum, Brindisi, Burgas, Chania, Corfu, Dakar–Diass, Dalaman, Funchal, Gazipasa, Heraklion, Ibiza, Ivalo, Izmir, Kajaani, Karpathos, Kefalonia, Kittilä, Kos, Marsa Alam, Ohrid, Palma de Mallorca, Preveza, Rhodes, Sälen-Trysil, Samos, Skiathos, Terceira, Tirana, Tivat, Zakynthos
Turkish Airlines	Istanbul
United Airlines	Chicago-O'Hare, Houston–Intercontinental, Newark, Washington–Dulles; Seasonal: San Francisco
Vietnam Airlines	Hanoi
Vueling	Alicante, Asturias, Barcelona, Bilbao, Málaga, Valencia; Seasonal: Ibiza, Palma de Mallorca
WestJet	Seasonal: Halifax
XiamenAir	Fuzhou, Xiamen

=== Operational peaks ===
Typical peak moments at Schiphol Airport are between 09:00 and 11:00, and between 13:00 and 15:00 for departures, with up to 58 departures between 14:00 and 15:00 on a typical weekday (a departure nearly every minute). The peak moment for arrivals is between 08:00 and 09:00 (with up to 52 arrivals on weekdays).

== Statistics ==
Annual passenger traffic
Year	Passengers	% change	Year	Passengers	% change
2000	39,606,925	▲7.7%	2013	52,569,200	▲3.0%
2001	39,531,123	▼ -0.2%	2014	54,978,023	▲4.6%
2002	40,736,009	▲3.1%	2015	58,284,864	▲6.0%
2003	39,960,400	▼ -1.9%	2016	63,625,534	▲9.2%
2004	42,541,180	▲6.5%	2017	68,515,425	▲7.7%
2005	44,157,005	▲3.8%	2018	71,053,147	▲3.7%
2006	46,066,465	▲4.3%	2019	71,706,999	▲1.0%
2007	47,795,148	▲3.8%	2020	20,884,044	▼ -70.9%
2008	47,430,112	▼ -0.8%	2021	25,492,633	▲22.1%
2009	43,570,372	▼ -8.1%	2022	52,472,188	▲105.8%
2010	45,211,749	▲3.8%	2023	61,889,586	▲18.0%
2011	49,755,252	▲10.1%	2024	66,828,759	▲7.2%
2012	51,035,590	▲2.6%	2025	68,773,349	▲2.9%

Busiest European routes to/from Amsterdam Airport (2025)
Rank	Change	Airport	Passengers 2025	Change %	Airlines
1	Steady	Barcelona, Spain	1,613,651	▲3.5	KLM, Transavia, Vueling
2	Steady	London-Heathrow, United Kingdom	1,469,651	▲0.6	British Airways, KLM
3	Steady	Dublin, Ireland	1,330,370	▲2.5	Aer Lingus, KLM, Ryanair
4	Steady	Madrid, Spain	1,328,397	▲8.1	Air Europa, Iberia Express, KLM
5	Steady	Copenhagen, Denmark	1,127,793	▼2.7	EasyJet, KLM, Norwegian, SAS
6	▲1	Manchester, United Kingdom	1,096,511	▲1.2	EasyJet, KLM
7	▼1	Paris–Charles de Gaulle, France	1,080,056	▼4.0	Air France, KLM
8	▲1	Málaga, Spain	1,051,745	▲15.2	EasyJet, KLM, Ryanair, Transavia, Vueling
9	▼1	Lisbon, Portugal	1,016,990	▼2.7	EasyJet, KLM, TAP, Transavia, Vueling
10	Steady	Stockholm-Arlanda, Sweden	955,177	▲6.8	KLM, Norwegian, SAS
11	▲12	Milan-Linate, Italy	871,118	▲38.2	EasyJet, ITA, KLM
12	▼1	Istanbul, Turkey	847,049	▼2.2	KLM, Turkish Airlines
13	Steady	Zürich, Switzerland	834,387	▲2.2	KLM, Swiss
14	Steady	Munich, Germany	805,688	▼0.4	Air Dolomiti, KLM, Lufthansa
15	▲1	Rome–Fiumicino, Italy	802,900	▲5.7	ITA, KLM
16	▲1	Oslo, Norway	792,455	▲6.7	KLM, Norwegian, SAS
17	▼2	Vienna, Austria	753,817	▼3.3	Austrian, KLM
18	▲1	Edinburgh, United Kingdom	751,718	▲9.6	Easyjet, KLM
19	▼7	Berlin, Germany	731,390	▼11.7	EasyJet, KLM
20	▲4	Istanbul-Sabiha Gökçen, Turkey	689,064	▲9.8	AJet, Pegasus

Busiest intercontinental routes to/from Amsterdam Airport (2025)
Rank	Change	Airport	Passengers 2025	Change %	Airlines
1	Steady	Dubai-International, United Arab Emirates	1,027,328	▲3.7	Emirates, KLM, Transavia
2	Steady	New York–JFK, United States	869,558	▼3.9	Delta, JetBlue, KLM
3	Steady	Atlanta, United States	808,445	▲3.9	Delta, KLM
4	Steady	Willemstad, Curaçao	707,420	▼1.8	Corendon, KLM, TUI
5	Steady	Toronto-Pearson, Canada	562,143	▲2.4	Air Canada, Air Transat, KLM
6	Steady	Minneapolis/St. Paul, United States	536,283	▼1.9	Delta, KLM
7	Steady	Detroit, United States	524,035	▼2.5	Delta
8	Steady	Boston, United States	442,447	▲5.2	Delta, JetBlue, KLM
9	Steady	Doha, Qatar	430,299	▲12.0	Qatar Airways
10	▲2	New Delhi, India	405,646	▲14.3	Air India, KLM
11	▼1	Shanghai-Pudong, China	366,491	▼0.6	China Eastern, KLM
12	▲1	Mexico City-Benito Juárez, Mexico	349,315	▼0.8	Aeroméxico, KLM
13	▲1	Bangkok-Suvarnabhumi, Thailand	331,596	0.0	EVA Air, KLM
14	▼3	Nairobi-Jomo Kenyatta, Kenya	320,020	▼10.8	Kenya Airways, KLM
15	▲1	Hong Kong	319,177	▲2.2	Cathay Pacific, KLM
16	▲4	Paramaribo-Zanderij, Suriname	312,449	▲6.1	KLM, Surinam Airways
17	▲2	Seoul-Incheon, South Korea	308,236	▲3.1	KLM, Korean Air
18	▼3	Los Angeles, United States	305,133	▼6.1	KLM
19	▲2	Singapore-Changi	298,628	▲2.2	KLM, Singapore
20	▲2	Seattle/Tacoma, United States	288,006	0.0	Delta

Main cargo routes to/from Amsterdam Airport (2025)
Rank	Change	Airport	Tonnes 2025	Change %
1	Steady	Shanghai-Pudong, China	197,851	▲1.3
2	Steady	Doha, Qatar	100,254	▲9.6
3	▲2	Quito, Ecuador	49,847	▲2.0
4	▼1	Nairobi-Jomo Kenyatta, Kenya	48,913	▼17.9
5	▲1	Guangzhou, China	46,632	▲0.5
6	▲1	Seoul-Incheon, South Korea	44,014	▼3.4
7	▲1	Istanbul, Turkey	43,896	▲1.2
8	▼4	Abu Dhabi, United Arab Emirates	41,364	▼22.6
9	▲10	Hong Kong	39,997	▲54.4
10	▼1	Dubai-International, United Arab Emirates	38,087	▼8.5
11	▼1	Singapore-Changi	34,883	▼11.0
12	▲1	Tokyo-Narita, Japan	32,293	▼4.3
13	▲3	Jeddah, Saudi Arabia	30,287	▲4.2
14	▼3	Chicago-O'Hare, United States	29,618	▼18.0
15	▲3	Dubai-Al Maktoum, United Arab Emirates	28,040	▲1.8
16	▲1	Taipei-Taoyuan, Taiwan	26,485	▼6.1
17	▼2	New York-JFK, United States	25,635	▼13.3
18	▲2	Leipzig, Germany	25,581	▲1.1
19	▼5	Miami, United States	25,580	▼19.7
20	▲1	Atlanta, United States	22,716	▼3.3

Countries with most air traffic movements to/from Amsterdam Airport (2025)
Rank	Country	Movements 2025	Change %
1	United Kingdom	75,462	▼1.8
2	Spain	46,254	▲8.4
3	Germany	40,553	▼3.6
4	Italy	29,538	▼3.2
5	United States	25,993	▲0.5
6	France	25,858	▼1.5
7	Norway	16,962	▼1.1
8	Switzerland	15,765	▼4.2
9	Denmark	15,303	▼6.3
10	Poland	14,534	▲8.5

Countries with most passenger movements to/from Amsterdam Airport (2025)
Rank	Country	Passengers 2025	Change %
1	United Kingdom	8,561,852	▼0.4
2	Spain	7,539,667	▲8.1
3	United States	6,012,689	▲0.3
4	Italy	4,003,863	▼0.1
5	Germany	3,663,832	▼2.5
6	France	3,004,045	▲1.3
7	Turkey	2,240,149	▼1.5
8	Greece	2,026,752	▲5.3
9	Portugal	2,025,502	▲7.0
10	Denmark	1,813,250	▲0.5

== Other facilities ==
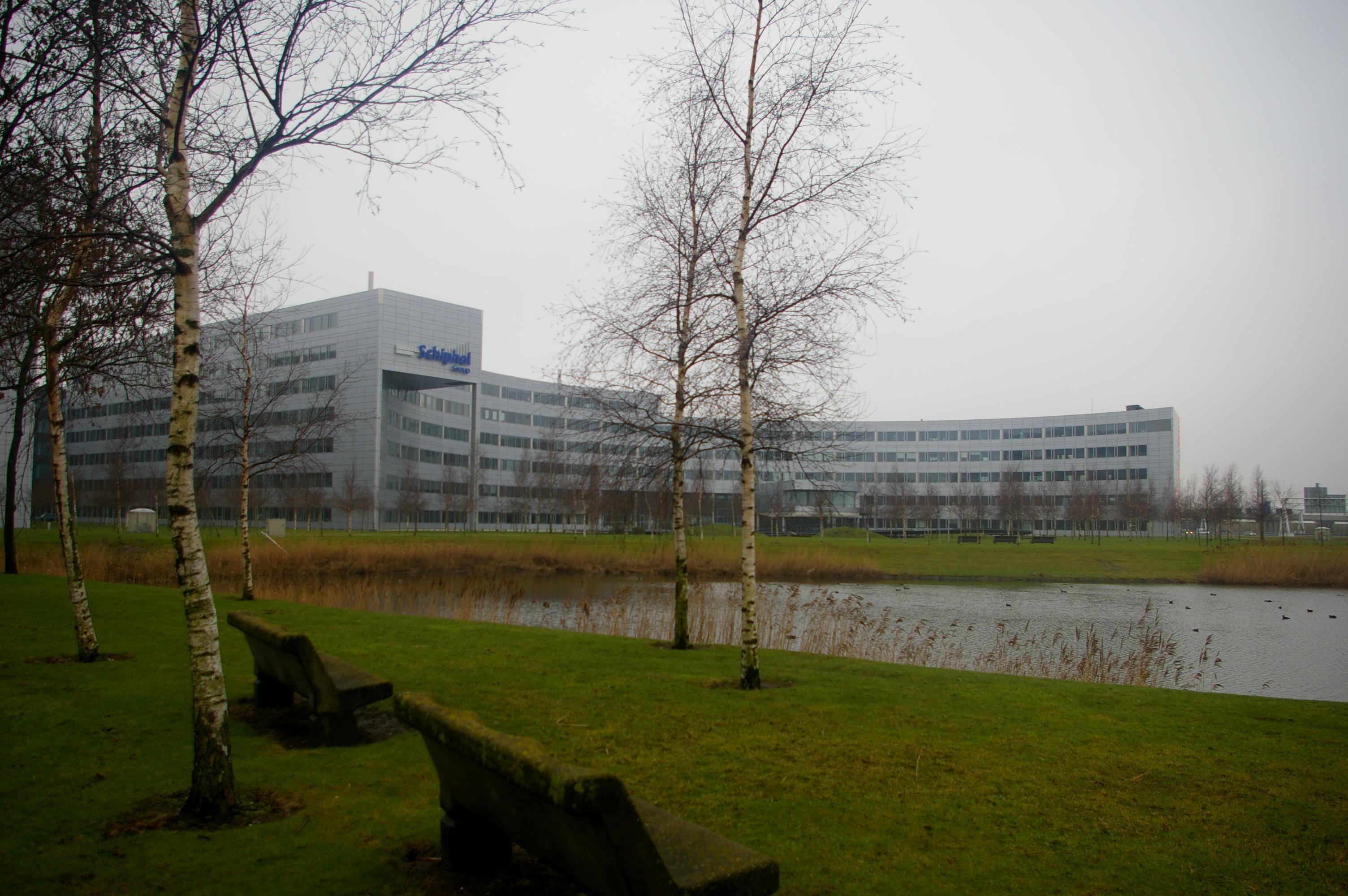
Schiphol Group offices

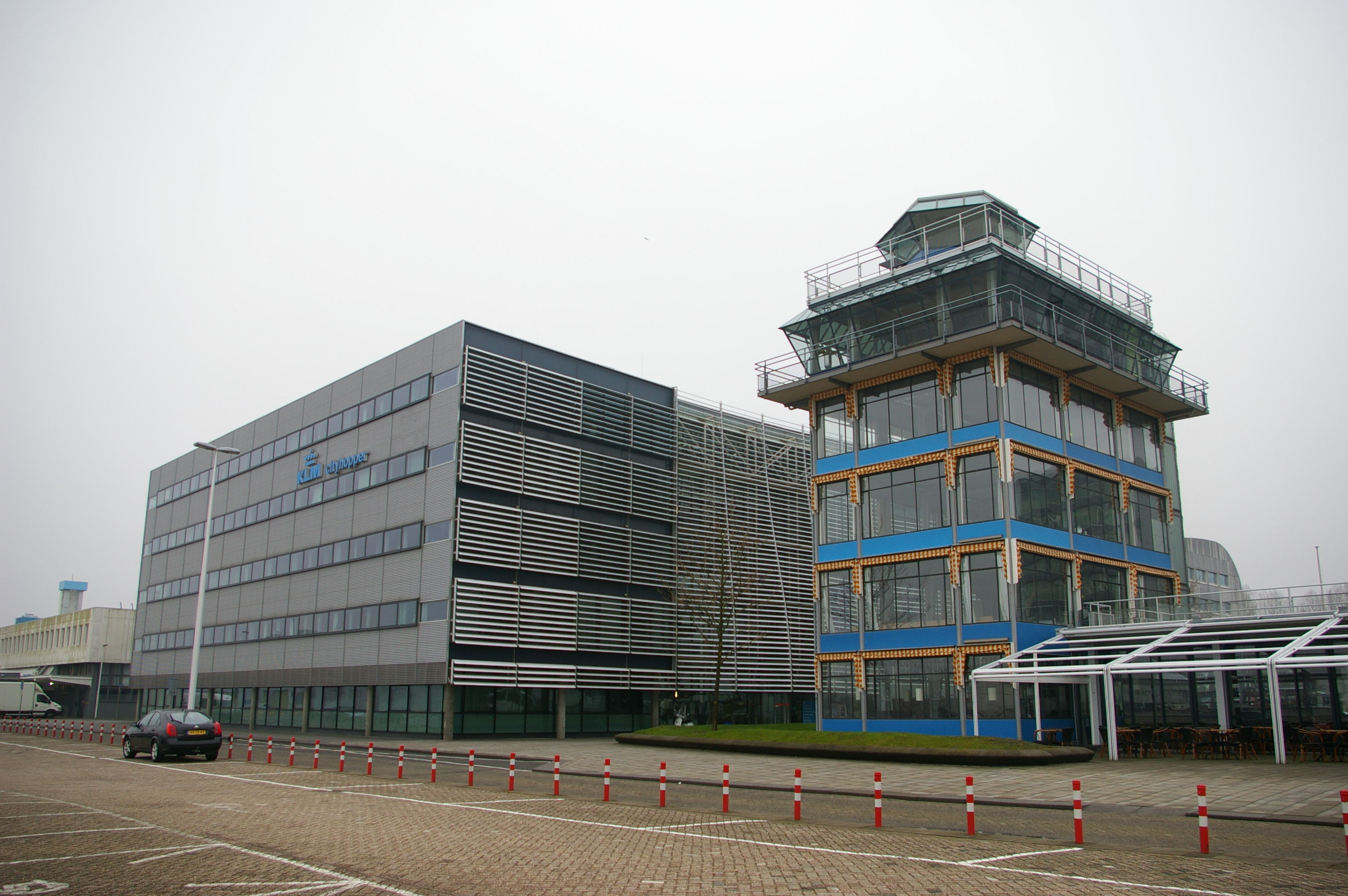
The Convair Building, which houses KLM Cityhopper and KLM offices, and the original Schiphol control tower

The TransPort Building on the Schiphol Airport property houses the head offices of Martinair and transavia. Construction of the building, which has 10,800 m^{2} (116,000 sq ft) of rentable space, began on 17 March 2009. Schiphol Group and the architect firm Paul de Ruiter designed the building, while construction firm De Vries & Verburg constructed the building.

The World Trade Center Schiphol Airport houses the head office of SkyTeam, local offices of China Southern Airlines and Iran Air.

The head office of Schiphol Group, the airport's operator, is located on the airport property.

The original control tower of Schiphol Airport, which the airport authorities had moved slightly from its original location, now houses a restaurant.

The area Schiphol-Rijk includes the head office of TUI fly Netherlands.

At one time, KLM had its head office briefly on the grounds of Schiphol Airport. Its current head office in nearby Amstelveen had a scheduled completion at the end of 1970. Previously, Martinair had its head office in the Schiphol Center (Dutch: Schiphol Centrum) at Schiphol Airport. Formerly, the head office of Transavia was in the Building Triport III at Schiphol Airport. NLM CityHopper and later KLM Cityhopper previously had their head offices in Schiphol Airport building 70.

The Convair Building, with its development beginning after a parcel was earmarked for its development in 1999, houses various KLM offices, including KLM Recruitment Services and the head office of KLM Cityhopper.

Nippon Cargo Airlines has its Europe regional headquarters at Schiphol. The National Aerospace Museum Aviodome–Schiphol was previously located at Schiphol.

There used to be an aviation museum, but in 2003, it moved to Lelystad Airport and was renamed the "Aviodrome."

== Ground transport ==
=== Rail ===
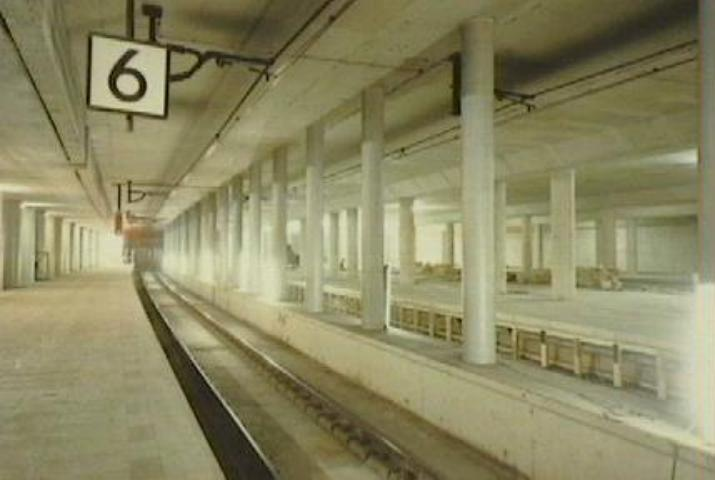
The construction of the tunnel and railway station in 1992

The Nederlandse Spoorwegen (NS), the national Dutch train operator, has a major passenger railway station directly underneath the passenger terminal complex that offers transportation 24 hours a day into the four major cities Amsterdam, Utrecht, The Hague and Rotterdam. There are efficient and often direct services to many other cities in the country. There are intercity connections to Almere, Lelystad, Amsterdam Centraal, Utrecht Centraal, both The Hague Centraal and The Hague HS, Rotterdam Centraal, Eindhoven Centraal, 's-Hertogenbosch, Leeuwarden, Groningen, Amersfoort Centraal, Apeldoorn, Deventer, Enschede, Arnhem Centraal, Nijmegen and Venlo.

Schiphol is served by international trains to Belgium and France. Eurostar provides direct services from Schiphol to Antwerp, Brussels and Paris Gare du Nord. Eurocity Direct provides up to 16 daily services via Schiphol between the Netherlands, Antwerp and Brussels.

=== Bus ===
Amsterdam Airport Schiphol is also easily accessible by bus, as many services call or terminate at the bus station located in front of the terminal building.

KLM also runs bus services from Schiphol to Maastricht railway station via Eindhoven Airport and Maastricht Airport

=== Road ===
Schiphol Airport can easily be reached by car via the A4 and A9 motorways.

While most roads leading to the airport are forbidden for bicycles, it is possible to reach the airport by bicycle via bicycle paths.

== Accidents and incidents ==
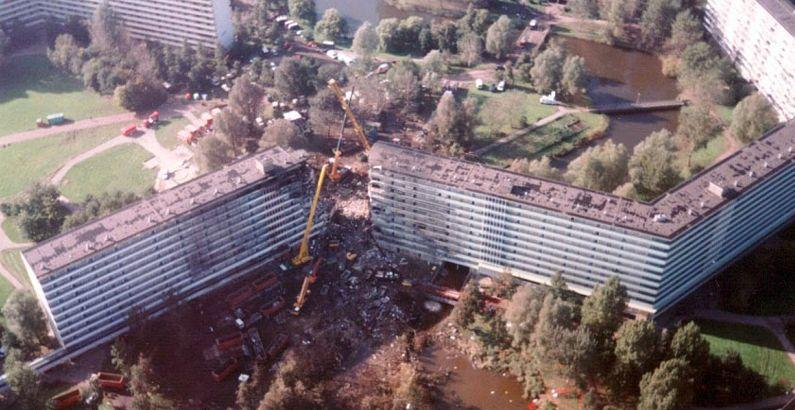
The crash site of El Al Flight 1862 in 1992

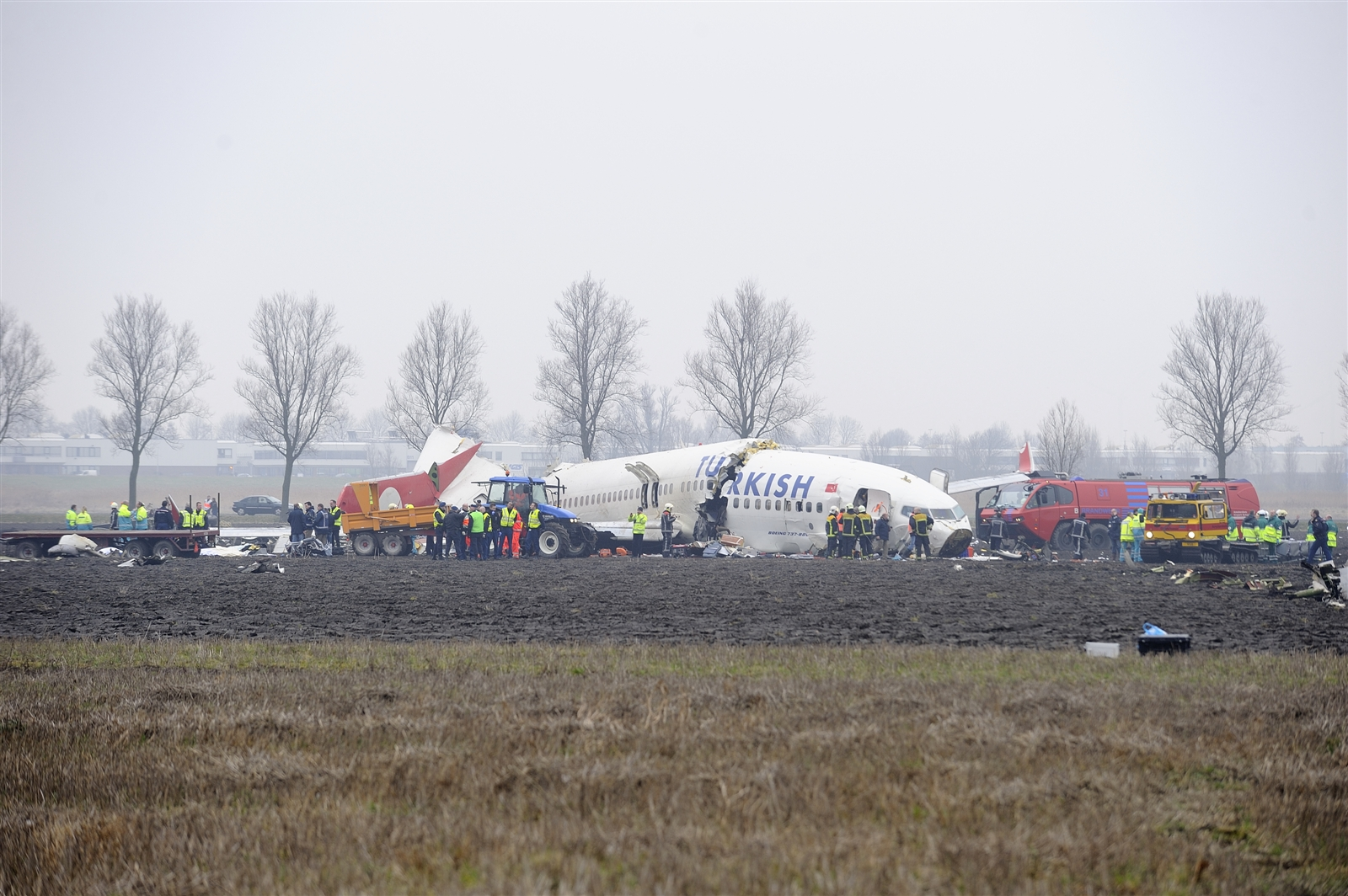
The crash site of Turkish Airlines Flight 1951 on 25 February 2009

- On 14 July 1935, a KLM Fokker F.XXII crashed after takeoff from Schiphol after suffering a failure of both left wing engines. 6 of the 20 on board were killed.
- On 18 December 1935, a midair collision between a Koolhoven F.K.43 and Fokker C.I occurred above the airport. 1 on the Koolhoven was killed.
- On 14 November 1938, a KLM DC-3 crashed on approach to the airport for undetermined reasons, killing 6 of the 19 people on board.
- On 9 December 1938, a KLM Lockheed 14 crashed on a training flight at the airport, killing 4 crew.
- On 6 June 1939, a KLM DC-2 crashed at the airport on a training flight, killing 1 on the ground.
- On 14 November 1946, a KLM Douglas C-47 crashed while attempting to line up with the runway in poor weather. All 26 on board were killed.
- On 1 May 1948, a KLM Douglas DC-6 skidded off the runway and crashed during a training flight due to possible propeller control problems; all five crew survived, but the aircraft was written off.
- On June 16, 1948, a KLM Douglas DC-4 stalled and crashed short of the runway at Schiphol Airport due to pilot error; all 27 on board survived. The pilot had adopted an incorrect approach configuration with an approach speed that was too low with full flaps selected, causing the aircraft to stall.
- On 25 May 1953, a KLM Convair 240 lost altitude and stalled just after takeoff from Schiphol Airport. The aircraft belly-landed on the runway and slid off, crossed a road and came to rest in a field. All 34 passengers and crew survived, however, two people who were watching the aircraft died when the aircraft crossed the road. The cause of the crash was not determined, but elevator control problems were blamed.
- On 4 October 1992, El Al Flight 1862, a Boeing 747-200 freighter, suffered a detachment of its number 3 engine after departure from Schipol. The engine struck the number 4 engine, also detaching it, as well as causing major damage to the wing. The aircraft attempted to return to Schiphol for an emergency landing, but it crashed into an apartment building in Bijlmermeer. All 4 people were killed, as well as 43 on the ground.
- On 4 April 1994, KLM Cityhopper Flight 433, a Saab 340, lost control and crashed next to the runway while attempting a go-around. The aircraft was making a diversion from its flight to Cardiff due to a false oil pressure warning, in response to which the captain had reduced the affected engine's thrust to idle. The pilots initiated a go-around close to the runway, but the asymmetric thrust was not properly managed and the aircraft rolled right and crashed. 3 of the 24 people on board were killed.
- On 25 February 2009, Turkish Airlines Flight 1951, a Boeing 737-800, stalled and crashed into a field on approach to Schiphol's Polderbaan runway. The aircraft broke into three major pieces, and 9 people were killed.
- On 23 February 2017, a Bombardier Dash-8 Q400 operated by Flybe suffered a collapse of its right landing gear after landing at the Oostbaan. The plane took off from Edinburgh after a 1.5-hour delay and had to battle storm Doris throughout the flight and during landing. None of the 59 passengers and four crew was injured in the incident, but the aircraft sustained significant damage.
- On 29 May 2024, an airport worker died after being ingested into the engine of an Embraer 190 operating as KLM Cityhopper Flight 1341. The incident occurred on the airport's apron during pushback as the aircraft was preparing to depart for Billund. Investigators from the Dutch Safety Board determined the worker had intentionally jumped into the running engine to commit suicide.

== See also ==
- Hello Goodbye (TV series)
- List of airports with triple takeoff/landing capability
- List of busiest airports by passenger traffic
- List of busiest passenger air routes
- Transport in the Netherlands
