= Piet Dankert =

Dutch politician (1934–2003)

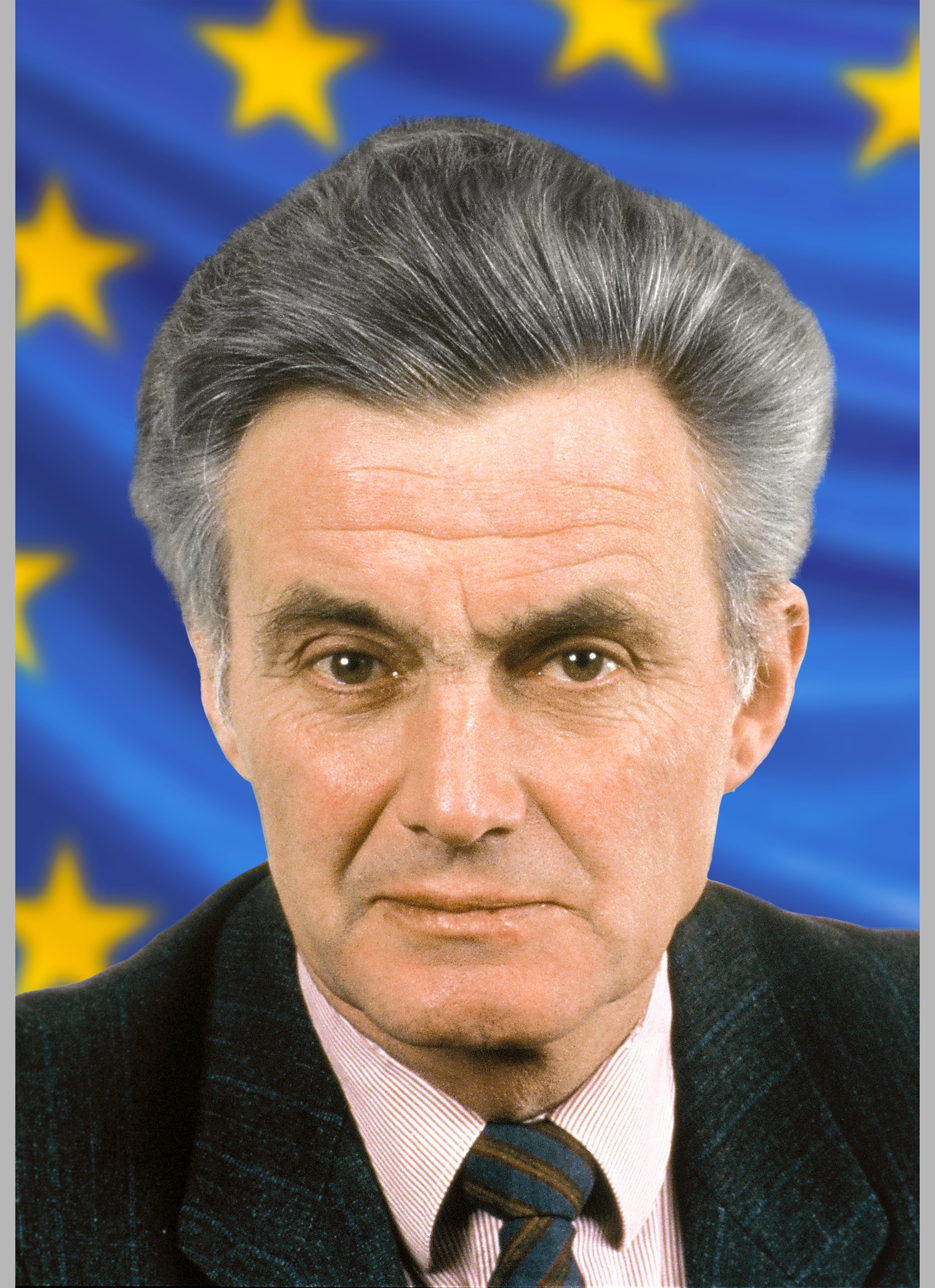
- Dankert in 1982

State Secretary for Foreign Affairs
- In office 7 November 1989 – 16 July 1994
- Prime Minister: Ruud Lubbers
- Preceded by: Berend-Jan van Voorst tot Voorst
- Succeeded by: Michiel Patijn

14th President of the European Parliament
- In office 19 January 1982 – 24 July 1984
- Preceded by: Simone Veil
- Succeeded by: Pierre Pflimlin

Member of the European Parliament
- In office 19 July 1994 – 20 July 1999
- In office 17 July 1979 – 7 November 1989
- Parliamentary group: Group of the Party of European Socialists (1994–1999); Socialist Group (1979–1989)
- Constituency: Netherlands

Member of the House of Representatives
- In office 6 February 1968 – 10 June 1981
- Parliamentary group: Labour Party

Personal details
- Born: Pieter Dankert; 8 January 1934 Stiens, Netherlands
- Died: 21 June 2003 (aged 69) Perpignan, France
- Party: Labour Party (from 1957)
- Education: University of Amsterdam (Bachelor of Education)
- Occupation: Politician · Civil servant · Teacher · Lobbyist

Pieter "Piet" Dankert (8 January 1934 – 21 June 2003) was a Dutch politician of the Labour Party (PvdA).

Dankert was born in Stiens. Dankert applied at the University of Amsterdam in June 1951 majoring in Education, obtaining a Bachelor of Education degree in July 1953. Dankert worked as a civics teacher at a Lyceum in Gorinchem from February 1960 until May 1963. Dankert worked as a researcher at the Koos Vorrink Institute from May 1963 until August 1971 and served as Director from September 1965 until August 1971. Dankert served on the Labour Party Executive Board from September 1965 until February 1968.

Dankert became a Member of the House of Representatives after Harry Peschar was appointed as President of the Court of Audit, taking office on 6 February 1968 serving as a frontbencher and spokesperson for Foreign Affairs, Defence and deputy spokesperson for European Affairs, Benelux Union and NATO. Dankert was elected as a Member of the European Parliament and dual served in those positions, taking office on 17 July 1979. In February 1981 Dankert announced that he wouldn't stand for the election of 1981 but wanted to remain in the European Parliament and he continued to serve until the end of the parliamentary term on 10 June 1981. Dankert served as President of the European Parliament from 19 January 1982 until 24 July 1984. Dankert also served as a distinguished professor of European integration at the University of Amsterdam from 1 August 2009 until 7 November 1989. After the election of 1989 Dankert was appointed as State Secretary for Foreign Affairs in the Cabinet Lubbers III, taking office on 7 November 1989. In March 1994 Dankert announced that he wouldn't stand for the election of 1994 but wanted to return to the European Parliament. Dankert returned as a Member of the European Parliament after the European Parliamentary election of 1994, he resigned as State Secretary for Foreign Affairs on 16 July 1994 and was installed as a Member of the European Parliament, serving from 19 July 1994 until 20 July 1999.

He subsequently served a second period in the European Parliament, where he devoted himself to working for the accession of Turkey to the European Union.

== Decorations ==
=== National ===
- Grand Officer of the Order of Orange-Nassau (8 October 1994)
- Knight of the Order of the Netherlands Lion (30 April 1980)

=== Foreign ===
- Belgium: Grand Officer of the Order of Leopold II (1 August 1996)
- Portugal: Grand Cross of the Order of Merit (31 October 1987)

Political offices
Preceded by Simone Veil	President of the European Parliament; 1982–1984	Succeeded by Pierre Pflimlin
Preceded by Berend-Jan van Voorst tot Voorst	State Secretary for Foreign Affairs; 1989–1994	Succeeded by Michiel Patijn
