= Lelystad Airport =

Airport in Lelystad, Netherlands

Lelystad Airport Luchthaven Lelystad

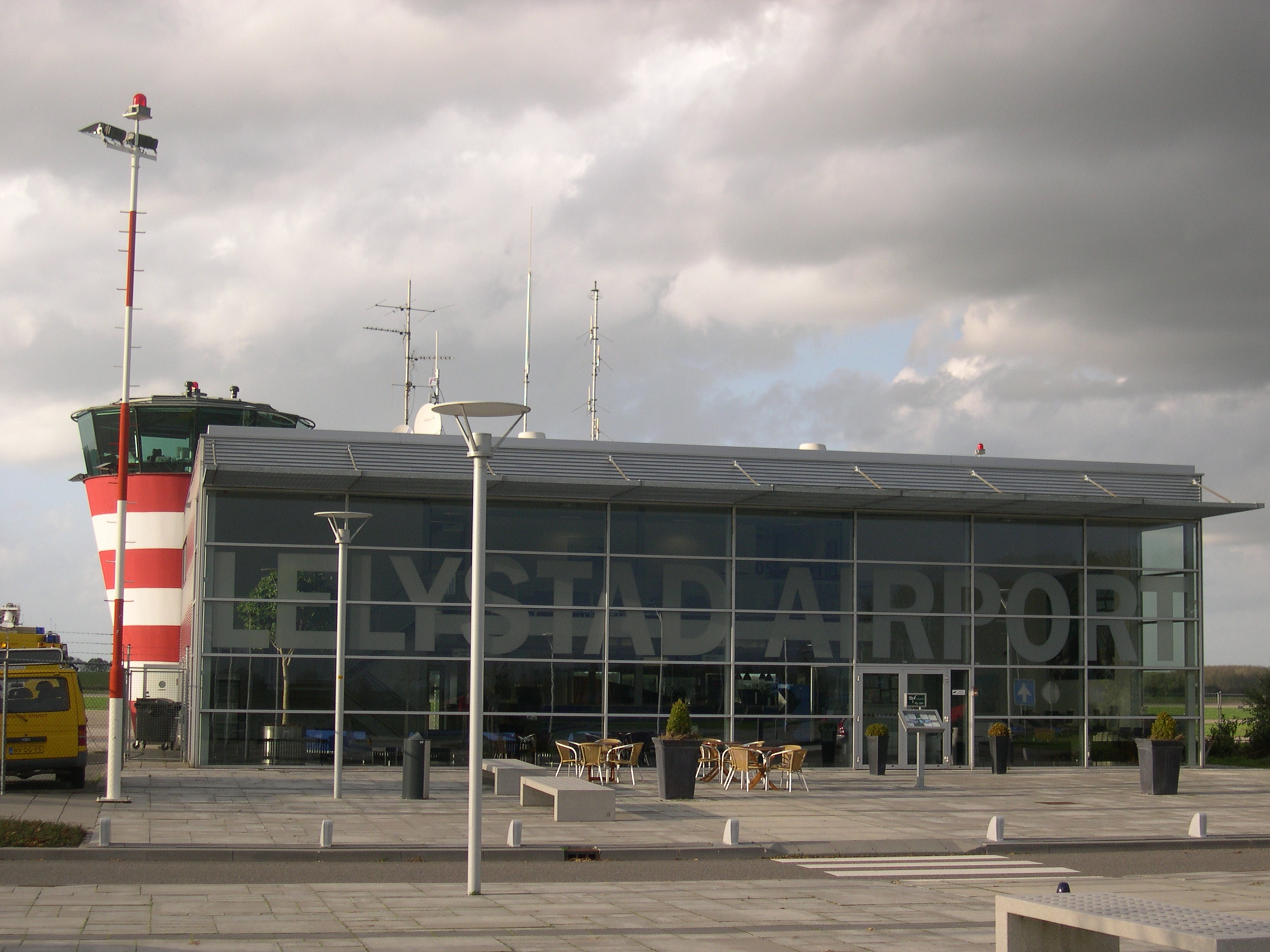
- IATA: LEY; ICAO: EHLE

Summary
- Airport type: Public
- Owner: Schiphol Group
- Operator: Lelystad Aerodrome
- Serves: Lelystad and Amsterdam, Netherlands
- Location: Lelystad, Flevoland
- Elevation AMSL: −12 ft (−3.7 m)
- Coordinates: 52°27′37″N 005°31′38″E
- Website: www.lelystad-airport.nl

Map
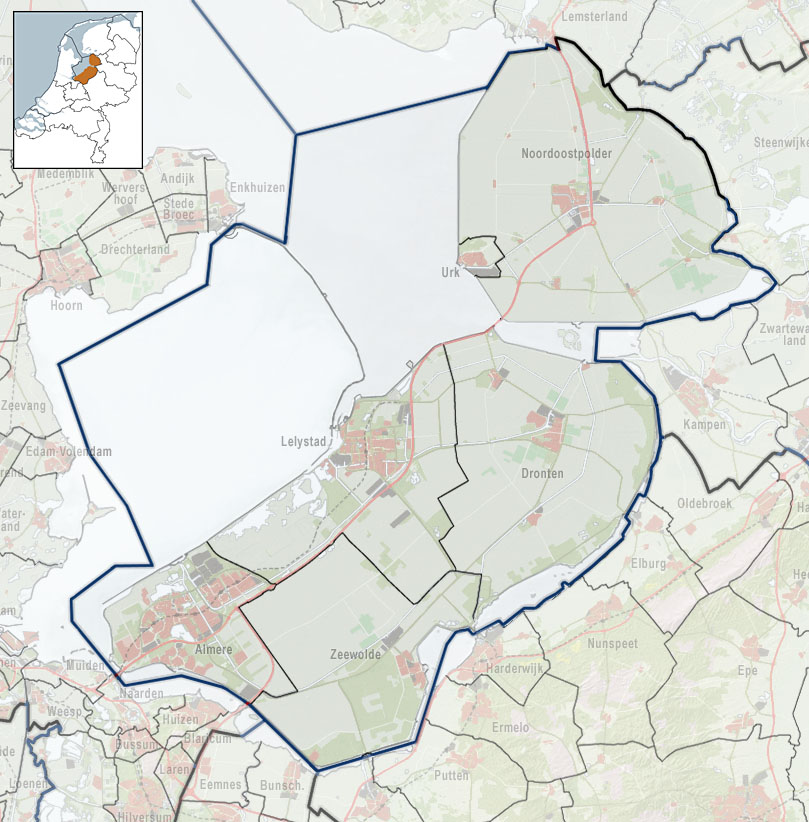
- Location within Flevoland in the Netherlands

Runways
Direction	Length		Surface
Direction	m	ft	Surface
05/23	2,700	8,858	Asphalt
- Sources: AIP

Lelystad Airport (IATA: LEY, ICAO: EHLE) is an airport 3.5 NM (6.5 km; 4.0 mi) south southeast of the city of Lelystad in Flevoland, Netherlands. It is the biggest general aviation airport in the Netherlands. The first flights were in 1971 and it became an official airport in 1973. Schiphol Group became owner of the airport in 1993. It is home to the aviation museum Aviodrome, which has a former KLM Boeing 747-200SUD on display. The airport serves Lelystad, the province of Flevoland, and Amsterdam. The airport is the base of AIS Airlines, although they do not operate scheduled passenger flights from Lelystad Airport but has plans to open commercial passenger traffic for late 2027.

== History ==
=== 20th century: Foundation and early years ===
In 1966 it was decided that the newly created Flevopolder required a central airport. A suitable location with room for future expansion was found to the south of Lelystad. The first flights from this location took place in 1971, but the site did not receive official status as an airport until 1973.

At first Lelystad had grass taxi- and runways, but it was found that the clay could not support the traffic, as tracks started to form. Because of the often poor condition of the terrain, the airport suffered from frequent closures. To resolve this problem, in 1978 the first of the taxiways was hardened and in 1981 the runway was hardened. In 1991 the runway length was increased to 1,250 metres (4,101 ft), to try to attract more business aircraft.

In 1993 the Schiphol Group became the owner of the airport.

=== 21st century: Expansion ===
The Aviodrome museum moved to Lelystad Airport from Schiphol in 2003. Because of the museum, various aviation events are held at the airport. AIS Flight Academy started an airline in 2009, AIS Airlines, and is headquartered at Lelystad Airport.

Despite not having obtained all required permits from relevant authorities yet, expansion of the airport was begun in 2010. The runway was to be extended to a total length of 2,700 metres (8,858 ft), long enough to facilitate all aircraft of the Boeing 737 and Airbus A320 families, and also suitable for operations with wide bodies like the Boeing 787 and Airbus A350, although not at maximum take off weight. The ILS (instrument landing system) was tested in June 2018. The new terminal was to be built in phases, easily expandable when the airport grows. The terminal building was finished in 2018, and should be capable of handling 25,000 flights per year. It can easily be expanded to handle up to 45,000 flights (7 to 8 million passengers) per year if required. The same strategy is used for the airside apron and aircraft stands, starting with four stands but with space for a total of twelve or more stand. The number of allowed aircraft movements is much discussed in the Netherlands and if the terminal is allowed to open, the airport will start the first year of operation at only 4,000 commercial movements per year, which means only around eleven movements daily.

The airport has its own exit from the A6 motorway, connecting it to Amsterdam, with travel times around 40–45 minutes when traffic allows. A public bus service also takes travelers to the Lelystad Centrum railway station, where trains run frequently in the direction of Amsterdam, Schiphol Airport and The Hague, Zwolle and Groningen.

A 10-year concession for all handling (landside and airside) was awarded to Viggo, a Dutch handling company.

The expansion of Lelystad Airport was driven by Amsterdam Airport Schiphol upon reaching its maximum of 500,000 allowed aircraft movements. The House of Representatives passed a motion in January 2024 to block the usage of the airport for commercial aviation, leaving it to the responsible minister to decide whether to execute the motion.

As of January 2025, the saga of opening Lelystad airport to commercial traffic had dragged on for at least a decade. The Schiphol Group's CFO hoped for a resolution in 2025, but one had been expected in 2024. To this day, the airport still has not all required permits required for commercial operations. Meanwhile, the Dutch Department of Defense has also expressed its desire to use Lelystad airport for F-35 operations. Local and provincial authorities have expressed their unwillingness to cooperate with that idea unless opening of the commercial terminal is permitted in tandem.
