= Groupe ADP =

French airport operator

- Type: Société anonyme
- Traded as: Euronext: ADP; CAC Mid 60 Component
- Industry: Transport
- Founded: 24 October 1945; 81 years ago
- Headquarters: Tremblay-en-France, France
- Key people: Philippe Pascal, CEO
- Products: Airport operations and services
- Revenue: ▲€6.158 billion (2024)
- Operating income: ▼€985 million (2024)
- Net income: ▼€573 million (2024)
- Total assets: ▲€20.179 billion (2024)
- Owner: French state (50.6%)
- Number of employees: 29,292 (2024)
- Subsidiaries: Paris Aéroport
- Website: www.parisaeroport.fr

Groupe ADP, formerly Aéroports de Paris or ADP (Paris Airports), is an international airport operator based in Paris (France). Groupe ADP owns and manages Parisian international airports Charles de Gaulle Airport, Orly Airport and Le Bourget Airport, all gathered under the brand Paris Aéroport since 2016.

Groupe ADP operates 26 international airports. It owns 46.1% of TAV Airports Holding, and cross-owns 8% of the Schiphol Group. Since 2025, the CEO is Philippe Pascal. Groupe ADP is owned by the company Aéroports de Paris SA, which is publicly listed at the Euronext Paris (SBF 120 and mid 60).

== History ==
=== Development of Parisian airports ===
The company L'aéroport de Paris was created as a établissement public à caractère industriel et commercial in 1945. In 1946, the first provisional terminal at Orly Airport was achieved, as well as the reconstruction of Paris–Le Bourget Airport. In the 1950s, Orly Airport outgrew Le Bourget's traffic, and became the leading Parisian airport, breaking the 1 million passengers/year milestone. Le Bourget launched the first edition of the Paris Air Show in 1953 and switched to business jet operations in 1976.

In 1957, L'aéroport de Paris started to look for a land to build a new Parisian airport. Construction of the airport started in 1966 and Charles de Gaulle Airport officially started its operations in March 1974. In 1976, 20 million passengers flew through the Parisian airports.

During the 1980s and 1990s, L'aéroport de Paris, which became Aéroports de Paris in 1989 and Paris Aéroport in 2016, built new satellites and terminals for the Charles de Gaulle airport (terminal 2, terminal 3). By 1987, traffic in the Parisian airports grew to 40 million. A TGV train station opened within the Charles de Gaulle airport in 1994.

=== Privatization and modernization of airports ===
Aéroports de Paris became a public company on 20 April 2005, although the French government retained a majority of the company's shares. In 2008, Aéroports de Paris and Schiphol Group signed a strategic partnership that involved buying 8% of each other's shares to seal the deal. In 2008, French conglomerate Vinci also bought 3.3% of Aéroports de Paris, calling the airport operator "the heart of its strategic aims".

In Parisian airports, the development and consolidation continued. At Paris-Charles de Gaulle Airport, the inter-terminal train system CDGVAL started in 2007. Terminal 2G opened in 2008 to serve international flights to Eastern Europe. Terminal 2E, Satellite 3 (Hall L) opened in 2005 and Satellite 4 (Hall M) in 2012. A museum opened within the airport in 2013 in Terminal 2E, Hall M. In Orly, a development project voted in 2012 plans to merge the airport's south and west terminals with the construction of an 80,000 m2 building to create one great terminal.

In 2012, Aéroports de Paris and Air France decided to work together towards embellishing the experience in Parisian airports and turn Paris-Charles de Gaulle into a competitive hub for international connections. Aéroports de Paris opened the new Hall M in Terminal 2E in July 2012 (7.8 million passengers/year capacity) which contains 65,000 square feet of shops and restaurants, a museum, and Air France's largest business lounge. In November 2014, Aéroports de Paris opened a luxury fashion area in terminal 2E, Hall K of the Paris-Charles de Gaulle Airport. From 2006 to 2015, the number of fine food restaurants grew from 1 to 20 in Paris - Charles de Gaulle Airport, and style fashion brands from 6 to 20.

=== Subsidiaries and international development ===
Starting in the 1970s, Aéroports de Paris became an active airport developer in other countries, contributing to the construction of the terminal 1 of the Abu Dhabi International Airport, the terminal 1 of the Shanghai Pudong International Airport, the Mohammed V International Airport, the Damascus International Airport, the Arturo Merino Benítez International Airport,... ADP Ingénierie was created in 2000 as a fully owned subsidiary to provide large-scale engineering for airport-related development projects.

Through its involvement in airport development projects, Aéroports de Paris became a stakeholder in many airports. ADP Management was created as a fully owned subsidiary in 1991 to consolidate the group's growing participations in airports and other industry-related assets. In 2012, in addition to its existing 8% share, ADP Management acquired 38% of TAV Airports Holding, the leading airport operator in Turkey that used to operate the Istanbul Atatürk International Airport as well as airports in Georgia, Tunisia, North Macedonia, Latvia and Saudi Arabia. ADP Management also acquired 49% of TAV Construction.

In 2003, Aelia (subsidiary of Lagardère Services) and Aéroports de Paris created the Société de Distribution Aéroportuaire (SDA) to manage the sales of alcohol, tobacco, cosmetics and food within the Parisian airports. In 2011, the company managing duty-free shops in Parisian airports merged with the SDA. In 2011, Groupe ADP and Lagardère Travel Retail also created Relay@ADP to manage bookstores, press and souvenirs stores in Parisian airports.

In 2001, Aéroports de Paris created its own telecommunications operator, ADP Telecom, which became Hub Telecom a year later, and finally Hub One in 2012. In 2006, Hub One was involved in the creation of Bolloré telecom, thus holds minority shares in the company. In 2016, Hub One deployed the free guest wifi network across the Parisian airports.

In 2011, Aéroports de Paris and French JCDecaux created the joint-venture branded JCDecaux Airport Paris to handle the interactive display advertising system in Parisian airports. In November 2016, Paris Aéroport launched a special photo exhibition with the French photographer Dominique Issermann which were exhibited all around the airport through the JC Decaux Airport display advertising system.

In 2015, Aéroports de Paris and Select Service Partner created the company Epigo to manage fast-food shops in the Charles de Gaulle Airport.

=== Rebranding Groupe ADP/Paris Aéroport ===
In November 2015, the group's CEO Augustin de Romanet announced ADP's strategic programme Connect 2020. The plan includes a major overhaul of the company's branding organization:

- All 3 Parisian international airports (Orly, Le Bourget, Charles de Gaulle) are united under one passenger brand, Paris Aéroport.
- All other airport-related subsidiaries of ADP are united under one institutional brand, Groupe ADP.

The rebranding shift became effective in April 2016. The Connect 2020 also planned to follow through with the project to unify Orly South and West terminals. In Charles de Gaulle, Terminals of the Satellite 1 will be merged, as well as terminal 2B and 2D. A new luggage automated sorting system and conveyor under Terminal 2E Hall L to speed luggage delivery time for airlines operating Paris-Charles de Gaulle's hub. The CDG Express, the direct express rail link from Paris to Charles de Gaulle Airport, is planned for completion by 2027.

== Activities ==
=== Paris Aéroport ===
Following the announcement of the Connect 2020 plan, the passenger brand Paris Aéroport was applied to Parisian international airports (Charles de Gaulle, Orly and Le Bourget). The goal is two-fold: Attract more visitors to the Parisian airports, and thus turn Paris Aéroport into a demonstration of Groupe ADP's expertise in airport management worldwide.

The Paris Aéroport brand borrows the love effect associated with the French capital to define its airport experience, choosing Paris vous aime (Paris loves you) as its tagline.

=== ADP Ingénierie ===
ADP Ingénierie was created in 2000 as a fully owned subsidiary to provide large-scale engineering for airport-related development projects.

Airports developed by ADP Ingénierie:

- Algeria: Houari Boumediene Airport
- Brunei: Brunei International Airport
- China: Shanghai Pudong International Airport, Beijing Daxing International Airport
- Egypt: Cairo International Airport
- France (except Paris): Bordeaux–Mérignac Airport, Montpellier–Méditerranée Airport, Nice Côte d'Azur Airport, Martinique Aimé Césaire International Airport, Pointe-à-Pitre International Airport
- Greece: Kasteli Airport (through GMR Airports)
- Guinea: Conakry International Airport
- Indonesia: Soekarno–Hatta International Airport
- Iran: Tehran Imam Khomeini International Airport
- Japan: Kansai International Airport
- Kazakhstan: Almaty International Airport
- Oman: Muscat International Airport
- Philippines: Ninoy Aquino International Airport, New Manila International Airport
- Qatar: Hamad International Airport
- Saudi Arabia: King Abdulaziz International Airport
- South Korea: Incheon International Airport
- Tunisia: Enfidha–Hammamet International Airport
- United Arab Emirates: Abu Dhabi International Airport, Dubai International Airport, Al Maktoum International Airport

=== ADP International ===
ADP International (formerly ADP Management) was created as a fully owned subsidiary in 1991 to consolidate the group's growing participations in airports and other industry-related assets.

Assets owned by Groupe ADP:

- Jordan: 51% of AIG, which operates Queen Alia International Airport
- India: 49% of GMR Airports, which operates Indira Gandhi International Airport and Rajiv Gandhi International Airport
- Chile: 45% of Santiago International Airport (since 2015)
- Turkey: 46% of TAV Airports Holding which owns shares and/or operates several airports, including:
  - Croatia
    - Zagreb Franjo Tuđman Airport
  - Georgia
    - Batumi International Airport
    - Tbilisi International Airport
  - Kazakhstan
    - Almaty International Airport
  - North Macedonia
    - Ohrid St. Paul the Apostle Airport
    - Skopje International Airport
  - Saudi Arabia
    - Madinah Airport
  - Tunisia
    - Enfidha–Hammamet International Airport
    - Monastir Habib Bourguiba International Airport
  - Turkey
    - Ankara Esenboğa Airport
    - Gazipaşa–Alanya Airport
    - İzmir Adnan Menderes Airport
    - Istanbul Atatürk Airport
    - Milas–Bodrum Airport
- Guinea: 29% of SOGEAC, which operates Conakry International Airport
- Belgium: 25.6% of Liège Airport
- Croatia: 20.8% of MZLZ, which operates Zagreb Airport
- Mauritius: 10% of ATOL, which operates Sir Seewoosagur Ramgoolam International Airport
- Netherlands: 8% of Schiphol Group
- Saudi Arabia: 5% of Matar, which operates King Abdulaziz International Airport

Assets under consideration by Groupe ADP:

- Vietnam: Plan to hold 20% of Airports Corporation of Vietnam - ACV (since 2017)

=== Airport shops and services ===
Over the years, Groupe ADP has formed strategic alliances with several large-scale providers to develop its airports' experience.

Partnerships and joint-ventures:

- Société de Distribution Aéroportuaire (Groupe ADP and Lagardère Travel Retail): management of the sales of alcohol, tobacco, cosmetics, food, and duty-free related products in Parisian airports.
- Relay@ADP (Groupe ADP and Lagardère): management of bookstores, press and souvenirs stores (travel essentials) in Parisian airports.
- JCDecaux Airport Paris (Groupe ADP and JCDecaux): management of the interactive display advertising system in Parisian airports.
- Epigo (Groupe ADP and Select Service Partner-SSP)

management of fast-food shops in Parisian Airports.

=== Other activities ===
Groupe ADP is also active in these airport-related sectors:

- Hub One: Telecommunications operator specialized in complex infrastructures (Airports, ports, congress centers and other trade-intensive hubs).
- Hub Safe: Airport safety operator. In 2017, Groupe ADP announced its intention to sell its 80% stake in Hub Safe.
- Real Estate: Groupe ADP owns 6,686 hectares of land, including 4,601 hectares for its aviation activities and 1,310 hectares for real estate purposes. Assets are managed through several subsidiaries including Cœur d'Orly Investissement and Roissy Continental Square.
- Cargo: In 2015, 2.21 million tons of cargo shipments flew through Parisian airports (Charles de Gaulle and Orly), 2.09 million in Charles de Gaulle alone, making it the top air cargo platform in Europe.

== Financial results ==
In million euros	2008	2009	2010	2011	2012	2013	2014	2015	2016	2017	2018
Gross revenue	2,527	2,633.4	2,739	2,502	2,640	2,754	2,791	2,916	2,947	3,617	4,478
EBITDA	848	883	926.7	972	1,017	1,075	1,109	1,184	1,195	1,567	1,961
Operating income	503.2	512.6	542.2	652	642	657	730	787	696	1,052	1,235
Net income	272.6	269.5	300.1	348	341	305	402	430	435	571	610

Breakdown of the group's revenue by segment:

Segment	2009	2010	2011	2012	2013	2014	2015	2016
Aeronautical	1,449.6	1,429.5	1,505	1,581	1,645	1,671	1,735	1,743
Retail	943.7	869.7	841	902	949	956	935	941
Real estate	232.6	213.7	241	253	265	264	265	263
International activities					69	79	96	97
Other activities	262.3	251.8	255	246		202	215	223

== Governance and shareholders ==
Aéroports de Paris SA - which fully owns and operates Groupe ADP, Paris Aéroport and other airport-related activities - is governed by a board of administrators (6 named by the shareholders, 6 named by the French government, 6 employees' representatives) and by an executive committee, both headed by Augustin de Romanet since 2012. As of 31 December 2018, the shareholders of Aéroports de Paris SA are:

Shareholder	Share (%)
French State	50.6
Royal Schiphol Group	8.0
Vinci	8.0
Crédit Agricole Assurances	5.1
Institutional Investors	21.9
Individual shareholders	4.3
Employees	1.6

According to French Transport Code, the French government must remain the majority shareholder.

== See also ==
- Paris Aéroport
- Royal Schiphol Group
- Fraport
