= Royal Schiphol Group =

Dutch airport management company

Royal Schiphol Group N.V.
- Founded: 1920 (Schiphol)
- Headquarters: Schiphol Building, Schiphol-C
- Key people: Ruud Sondag (CEO)
- Products: Airports
- Revenue: ▲€1.509 billion (2018)
- Operating income: ▲€368 million (2018)
- Net income: ▼€285 million (2018)
- Total assets: ▲€7.354 billion (2018)
- Owner: State of the Netherlands (69.77%); Government of Amsterdam (20.03%); Groupe ADP (8.0%); Government of Rotterdam (2.2%)
- Number of employees: 2,324 (2018)
- Website: Schiphol Group

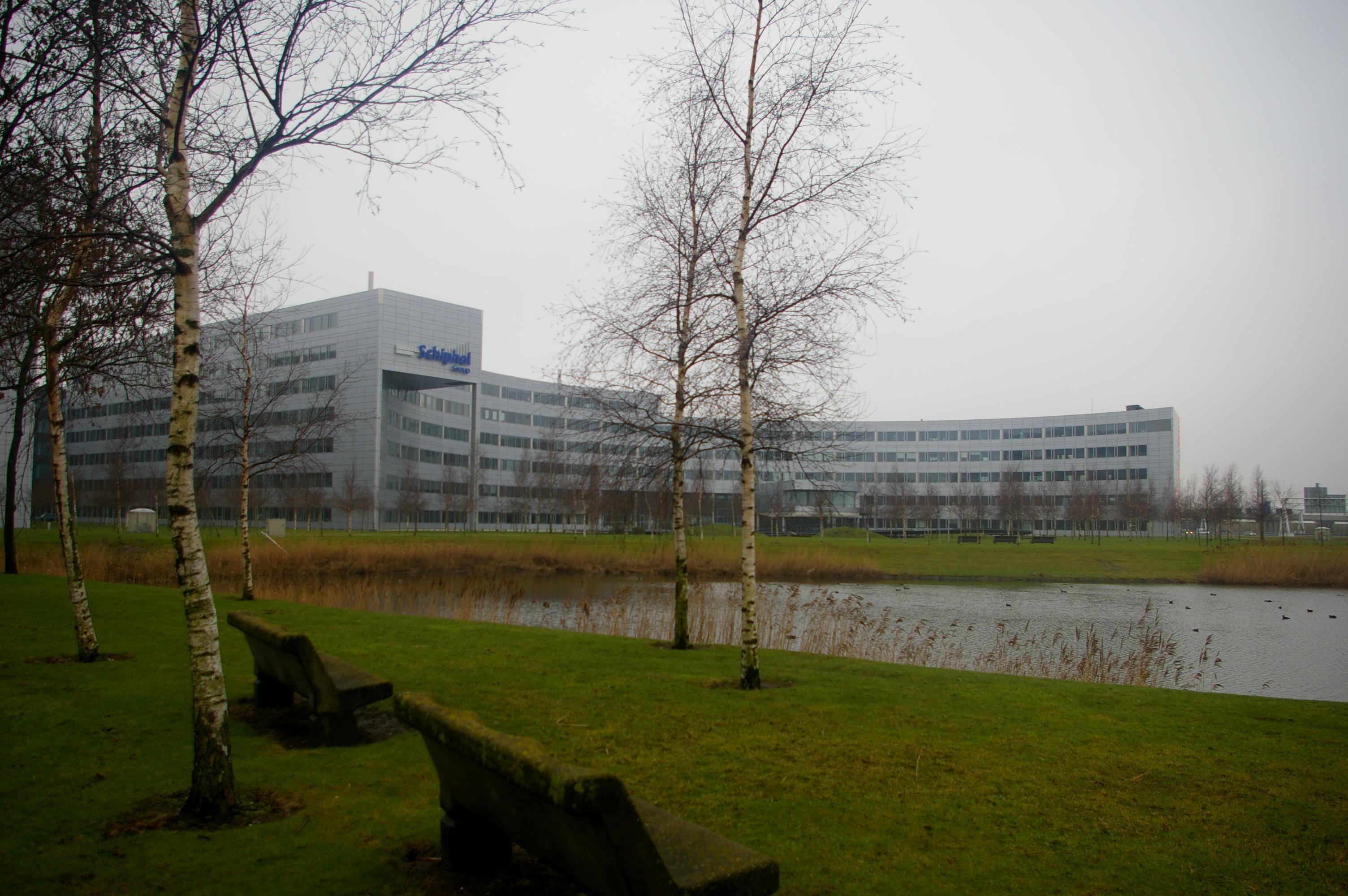
Schiphol Group offices

Royal Schiphol Group is a Dutch airport management company.

It was established during 1916 in conjunction with Amsterdam Airport Schiphol, having been responsible for operating and developing throughout its operational life. During October 2008, a strategic alignment between the Schiphol Group and Aéroports de Paris resulted in the formation of the world's largest airport group. Its head office is located on the grounds of Schiphol in Haarlemmermeer, Netherlands.

== History ==
The origins of the Schiphol Group are closely associated with that of the Amsterdam Airport Schiphol, which first became operational during 1916 amid the ongoing First World War. Being initially operated on behalf of the Dutch military, it transitioned to civilian operations shortly following the Armistice of 11 November 1918. During 1926, the first airport manager, Jan Dellaert, is charged with ensuring the facility's safety and ongoing future; Dellaert subsequently devised and put into practice a new strategic plan for Schiphol Airport's commercial future.

The effective operation of Schiphol Airport has long been regarded as one of Schiphol Group's main priorities. Throughout the 1920s and 1930s, the airport continued to expand, increasingly focusing on civilian operations, such as with the Dutch airline KLM. By 1940, Schiphol Airport was furnished with four asphalt runways set at 45-degree angles to one another. During the Second World War, it was captured by the German military and briefly renamed Fliegerhorst Schiphol. The airport was devastated by aerial bombing, but was rapidly rebuilt following the end of the conflict.

During 1949, it was decided that Schiphol Airport would be developed as the primary airport of the Netherlands. By the 2010s, Schiphol was being used by the third-highest number of passengers, as well as the fourth-highest volume of cargo of all airports in Europe. During 2019 alone, 1.57 million tons of freight and 71.7 million passengers reportedly flew through Schiphol.

During the postwar era, the Schiphol Group opted to extend its operations beyond Schiphol Airport itself. It has become involved in the operation of other airports in the Netherlands, being the owner and operator of both Rotterdam The Hague Airport and Lelystad Airport; it also holds a majority share in Eindhoven Airport. Schiphol Group has also been involved in strategic collaborations and partnerships with numerous foreign airports, including Incheon International Airport in South Korea, Brisbane Airport in Australia, Hong Kong International Airport in China, Queen Beatrix International Airport, and John F. Kennedy International Airport in New York, United States. It typically engages in infrastructure and facilities investments at such airports in exchange for a stable dividend stream to achieve a return on its equity.

During October 2008, it was announced that the boards of Aéroports de Paris and the Schiphol Group had agreed to take stakes of eight percent each in the other's companies; this move resulted in the formation of the world's largest airport group. Schiphol Group has stated that its involvement in such international partnerships has multiple benefits to its core business, including gaining experience of various business models and developing brand awareness.

In 2011, the Schiphol Group signed a cooperation agreement with both Aéroports de Paris and Incheon International Airport to cooperate on their customer relations and marketing activities; this arrangement was subsequently renewed by all participants three years later.

During March 2014, the Schiphol Group acquired 38.85% of the AREB property fund; this gave it control over 17 strategic properties at Amsterdam Airport. One year later, the Schiphol Group announced the sale of a 60% stake in Schiphol Airport Retail, the entity that handles retail stores within the airport, to Heinemann Duty Free & Travel Value. The revenue from retail sales has reportedly been replaced by both a concession fee and a share in the results of associates.

During March 2016, the Schiphol Group authorized the construction of a new terminal at the Amsterdam Airport Schiphol, scheduled to be ready by 2023, with a capacity of 14 million passengers per year. That same year, to mark the company's 100 years of operation, Schiphol Group was awarded a royal seal by Willem-Alexander of the Netherlands; accordingly, it was given the right to name itself the Royal Schiphol Group. Shortly thereafter, a crown was added to its company logo.

In September 2022 CEO Dick Benschop resigned following months of chaos and queues at Schiphol Airport. In October 2022 it was announced that the Schiphol Group gained a 40% share in the Maastricht Aachen Airport.

== Financial structure ==
Airports belonging to the Royal Schiphol Group in The Netherlands.
Airports belonging to the Royal Schiphol Group in the rest of the world.

=== Shareholder of ===
The Schiphol Group is 100% shareholder of Amsterdam Airport Schiphol, Rotterdam The Hague Airport, and Lelystad Airport. It also owns 51% of Eindhoven Airport, 40% of Maastricht Aachen Airport and 19.6% of Brisbane Airport. The group holds the operating franchise for John F. Kennedy International Airport's Terminal 4. Beside that, the airport group owns 35% of Hobart Airport.

Airport	Stake Percentage
Amsterdam Airport Schiphol	100%
Rotterdam The Hague Airport	100%
Lelystad Airport	100%
John F. Kennedy International Airport Terminal 4	100%
Eindhoven Airport	51%
Maastricht Aachen Airport	40%
Hobart Airport	35%
Brisbane Airport	19.6%

=== Shareholders ===
The Schiphol Group is owned by the Dutch Ministry of Finance (69.77%), the municipalities of Amsterdam (20.03%) and Rotterdam (2.2%) and Groupe ADP (8.00%).

During 2014, the group reported €672 million in revenue, a 3.4% increase to the previous year. The group's former CEO, Jos Nijhuis, earned a €900,000 salary that same year.
