= Aeroput MMS-3 =

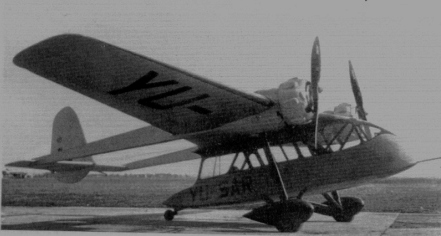

General information
- Type: Light transport / Utility
- National origin: Serbia
- Manufacturer: Aeroput workshops, Zemun, Serbia
- Designer: Milenko Mitrović - Spirta
- Status: Destroyed
- Primary user: Aeroput
- Number built: 1

History
- First flight: January 1936

The Aeroput MMS-3 (Serbian Cyrillic: Аеропут ММС-3) was the first Yugoslavian twin-engined light three-seater passenger aircraft, produced by Aeronautical service of Aeroput for its own needs in 1935. The chief designer was the aviation engineer Milenko Mitrović - Spirta, the CTO of Aeroput.

== Development ==
Design work was conducted in 1934, the designer was aeronautical engineer Milenko Mitrović - Spirta, whose initials are on the plane as the MMS label (such was then the custom among constructors of Yugoslav aircraft). The number on the label represents a 3-seater passenger plane. Mr Milenko Mitrović - Spirta was then technical director of Aeroput and suggested that the Board of Directors on the basis of his project, which was in March 1934 tested in the Eiffel wind tunnel in Paris, made for Aeroput in his workshop for repairing aircraft an airplane which would be used as aviotaxi, for whom he felt a great need. The constructor then tried several configurations, including inline and radial engines, without guards and shields, placed at different distances from the fuselage. The final configuration was characterised by an aerodynamic perfection of Class 12, in those years achieved only by very good gliders. During 1935 the prototype was built, the maiden flight occurring in January 1936. The first flight and test of the aircraft were conducted by pilot Vladimir Striževski, head of Aeroput transport pilots. As the plane showed good performance, in the same season in 1936 it entered operational use.

== Technical specification ==
The MMS-3 was a twin-engine high-wing monoplane of wooden construction with the fuselage covered with plywood, and the wings with fabric, intended primarily for aerial taxi operations. It was powered by two 88 hp (66 kW; 90 PS) Pobjoy Niagara III 7-cylinder piston radial engines, driving two-bladed fixed-pitch propellers. These engines were characterized by low fuel consumption and very quiet operation, allowing greater passenger comfort. For that time the plane had unusual concept, instead of conventional fuselage, in the extension of the engine carrier had two tail fins (bi-fuselage). Fuel tanks were located in the wing between the two engines with fuel capacity of 265 L (70 US gal). Cabins of pilots and passengers represent one unit, which like gondola is located below the airplane wings.

The cabin had a large window area that provided excellent visibility to the pilot and passengers. This made it an extraordinary airplane for panorama flights. The plane had fixed landing gear of a conventional type, with the tail wheel located at the rear of the fuselage and the main wheels mounted on one side of the gondola fuselage and on the other side to engine mount. The main wheels had aerodynamic fenders. In 1940 year, the MMS-3 was used to test tricycle undercarriage, i.e. with a nose wheel. During this time the engineer Mitrović and Prof. Dr. Ing. Miroslav Nenadović collaborated on a twin engine light bomber project called Nemi, and that was supposed to have a similar arrangement as used on the MMS-3, but with a tricycle undercarriage. The project Nemi was never realised.

The appearance of plane Aeroput MMS-3, because of its outstanding aerodynamic characteristics, caused a great interest in France, United Kingdom, Germany and Czechoslovakia. Negotiations for the sale of the license were started, but were not concluded, and no series production did ever take place.

== Operational use ==
In the summer of 1936 year the MMS-3 received a certificate and was registered as YU-SAR. It was used on passenger routes from Belgrade to Sarajevo, Podgorica and Skoplje, also carrying mail and newspapers. During a flight on the route Belgrade – Podujevo – Skoplje on 15 September 1936 it made a forced landing due to an engine failure and was damaged slightly. The damage was quickly repaired so that the aircraft, by the end of 1937, had completed 65 hours of flight time, 1938 – 79 hours, 1939 – 102 hours. In addition, it was used by Aeroput for pilot training. It was also used for publicity purposes, taking the visitors of aero-meetings for joy-rides at minimum prices which contributed to the popularisation of aviation and air transport in Yugoslavia. The plane had another advantage: passenger seats could be easily removed from the cabin and the plane turned into a cargo airplane (the first Yugoslav cargo plane).

Just before the April War in 1941 the aircraft was used by the 603rd training squadron of the Royal Yugoslav Air Force (JKRV) which was located at Grab Airport near Trebinje and it was destroyed during withdrawal from the airport. According to other sources, in March 1941, in light of the tense international situation around Yugoslavia, the MMS-3 aircraft was taken over by the JKRV and placed in the 603rd Auxiliary Squadron where it was to be used as a liaison aircraft for deployment and courier needs.

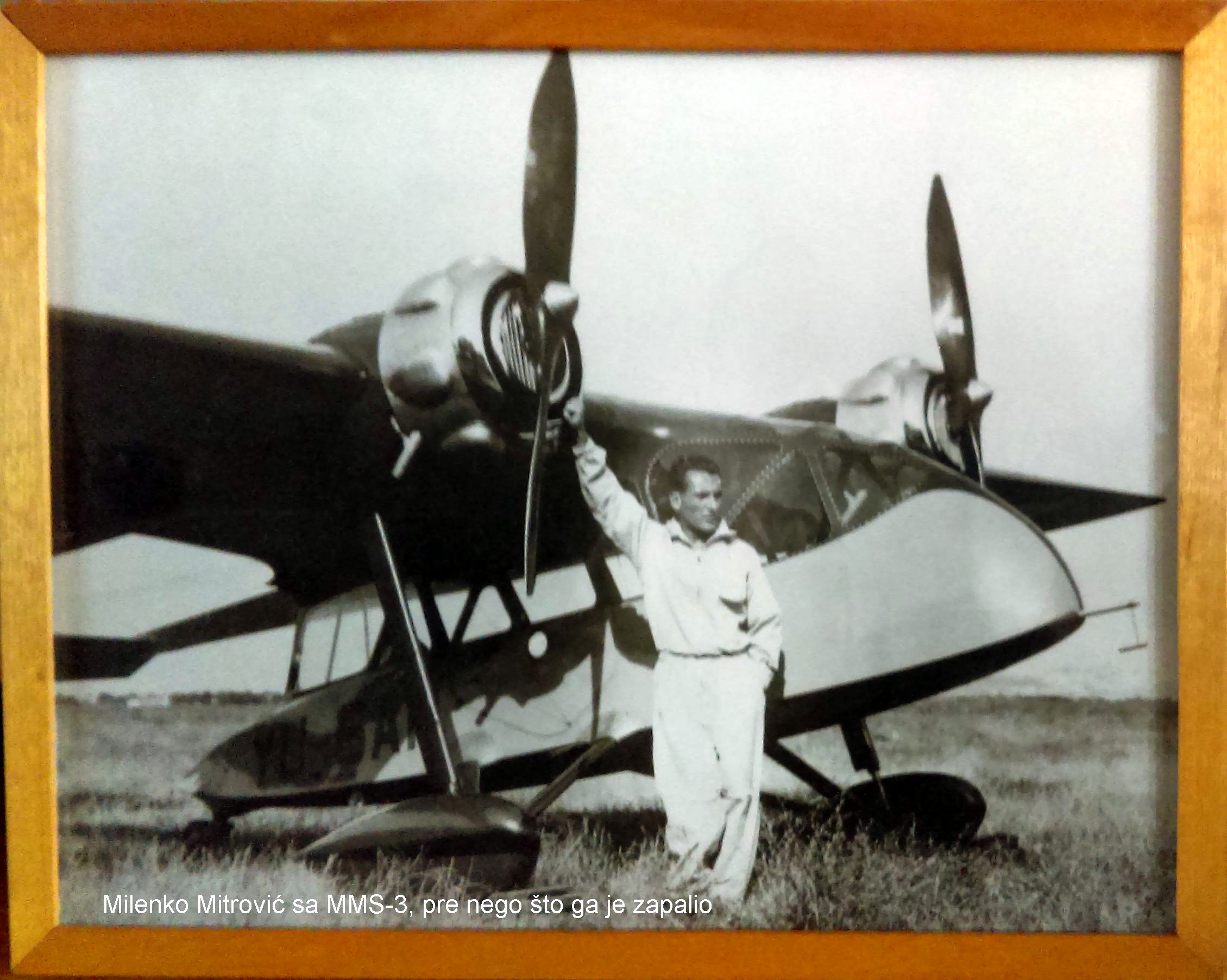
Milenko Mitrović Spirta with MMS-3, before he set it on fire, to prevent Germans taking it (1941).

According to eyewitness reports, after the German invasion of Yugoslavia in April 1941, the aircraft was destroyed by the crew at the airport near the village of Divci in Valjevo region so that it would not fall into enemy hands. The Plane constructor Milenko Mitrović Spirta (15 February 1905 Novi Sad, Serbia - 23 August 1986 Peterborough, NH, USA) photographed the plane before it was destroyed.

== Operators ==
=== Civil operators ===
Kingdom of Yugoslavia

- Aeroput

=== Military operators ===
Kingdom of Yugoslavia

- Royal Yugoslav Air Force

== Specifications (MMS-3) ==
Data from all-aero.com - Aeroput MMS-3

General characteristics

- Crew: 1
- Capacity: 3 passengers
- Length: 7.42 m (24 ft 4 in)
- Wingspan: 11.56 m (37 ft 11 in)
- Height: 2.25 m (7 ft 5 in)
- Wing area: 16 m^{2} (170 sq ft)
- Empty weight: 630 kg (1,389 lb)
- Gross weight: 1,030 kg (2,271 lb)
- Powerplant: 2 × Pobjoy Niagara III 7-cylinder air-cooled geared radial piston engines 66 kW (90 PS; 89 hp)
- Propellers: 2-bladed wooden fixed-pitch propellers

Performance

- Maximum speed: 235 km/h (146 mph, 127 kn)
- Cruise speed: 215 km/h (134 mph, 116 kn)
- Landing speed: 75 km/h (47 mph; 40 kn)
- Range: 600 km (370 mi, 320 nmi)
- Endurance: 3 hours (2 passengers); 5 hours (1 passenger)
- Service ceiling: 6,000 m (20,000 ft)

1,800 m (5,900 ft) (single engine)

- Rate of climb: 6.5 m/s (1,280 ft/min)
- Time to altitude: 5,000 m (16,000 ft) in 22 minutes
- Wing loading: 64.38 kg/m^{2} (13.19 lb/sq ft)
- Power/mass: 0.13 kW/kg (0.079 hp/lb)

== See also ==
- Jat Tehnika
- Yugoslav Royal Air Force
