= Viktor Nikitin (pilot) =

Russian pilot (1893–1933)

- Викторь Михаӣловичь Никитинь
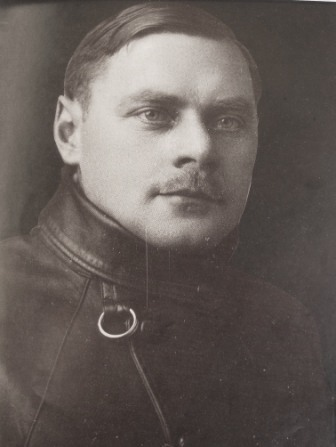
- Born: May 2, 1893; Lozanovkа, Russian Empire
- Died: September 12, 1933 (aged 40); Ljubljana, Yugoslavia
- Occupation: Pilot

Viktor Mikhailovich Nikitin (Russian: Викторь Михаӣловичь Никитинь; May 2, 1893 – September 12, 1933) was a Russian-Yugoslavian aviator, killed in the first disaster of Yugoslav civil aviation. Nikitin was one of the three top pilots in the first Yugoslav airline company Aeroput. He died in a plane crash, when Aeroput's Farman F.306 called "Podgorica" crashed shortly after the take off from Ljubljana airport. The accident happened on the regular flight Ljubljana-Sušak on 12 September 1933.

== Biography ==
Viktor Nikitin was born on May 2, 1893, in Lozanovkа неар Kiev, Russian Empire to father Mihail and mother Henriette who was of Polish ancestry. Viktor was the third of five sons (Eugene, Vladimir, Viktor, Nicholas and Alexandar) and four daughters (Anna, Olga, Sofia and Lidia).

After graduating from Kiev gymnasium in 1914 he entered Elisabethgrad Cavalry Academy, and in 1915 he joined the aviation as a volunteer and was sent to the Sevastopol Military Aviation school in Kacha where he became a military pilot. It is in Katcha that he first befriended Vladimir Strizevski, future colleague in the first Yugoslav civil aviation company Aeroput established in Belgrade in 1927.

=== World War I ===
Around the same time, when he received a diploma of an international pilot, in June 1916, Viktor Nikitin was sent to the unit at the front, which was part of the 12-corps aviation department. Very quickly, he mastered the skills to pilot and the same year he moved to a single-seat fighter planes. During the war, he got slightly wounded once, but had no other accidents. As a lieutenant in 1917 he was an appointed commander of the aviation detachment of 7th Division throughout the war and as the opponents he had German and Austro-Hungarian pilots. After signing of the Brest Peace Treaty, Nikitin was in the unit of General Denikin until its collapse. After that, his unit joined General Wrangel. Throughout the war and revolution, Nikitin had 606 hours of combat flights.

Soon after the graduation, he married Vera Mihajlovna Deminjeva with whim he had a son Yuri (George) born 30 September 1917. The family settled in Kiev, where they lived until the arrival of the Bolsheviks, when they were evacuated to Odessa.

=== Emigration to Yugoslavia ===
Soon, after Western intervention failed, the entire Nikitin family went into exile from Odessa across the Crimea, Simferopol and Sevastopol to Varna, Bulgaria, where they temporarily resided.

To survive, the male members of the family had to do the hardest physical labor. As a White Russian exiles were slowly leaving to the Western European countries, Nikitin family at the invitation of the prince Alesander of Yugoslavia boarded a ship and via Constantinople and Gallipoli in 1921 was moved to Yugoslavia.

First residency of Nikitin family was in Novi Sad, probably because at that time Novi Sad was the aviation center of the new state, later they moved to Zemun, where they found conditions favorable for permanent residence. In Zemun, Viktor built a luxury 4-storey house which was finished three months before his death.

Upon his arrival in Novi Sad 1921, he started working as a laborer at the airport. At that time, the Yugoslav military aviation experts were required of all professions and profiles. As Viktor was highly qualified, he started working as an aviation mechanic at the Novi Sad airport. After a few years, he moved to SIDNA (Franco-Romanian airline) and worked as an airline mechanic. He was trying to restart his position as a pilot and finally succeeded. He was hired as a pilot and a flight instructor in military aviation. His reputation and obvious knowledge were his best recommendation. Viktor Nikitin was an officer in the Yugoslav Royal Air Force (JKRV) and later when he worked in Aeroput, next to all of his obligations, he continued training junior pilots, flying practice and has maintained the war planes until the end of his life.

=== Aeroput ===
This company has engaged the first pilots - Viktor Nikitin, Vladimir Striževski and Mihail Jarošenko. Nonetheless, aircraft was relatively fragile, with no navigation, complex weather conditions and other difficulties. While working at Aeroput, Nikitin became an experienced pilot, having made 466 hours of flight time.

As a skilled pilot, Nikitin responded to calls for flying Aero Club, who at the time worked intensively to popularize aviation. At public events, he piloted aircraft type de Havillend and performed tricks.

During his career, Nikitin had only three incidents:

- Wounded in a combat flight on the eastern front
- Emergency landing on unsuitable terrain when they ran out of fuel coming back from the international competition of military teams
- Emergency landing of passenger aircraft move-29 on a regular route Belgrade - Zagreb near the village Popovača near Slavonski Brod due to overheating engines.

All three have passed without victims. During his pilot experience, there was no plane in the sky that he didn't fly as a fighter pilot and flight instructor, Ikarus test pilot, a member of the Aero Club pilot or Aeroput pilot.

=== Death ===
Crash of the Aeroput passenger plane type Farman F.306 called "Podgorica", license plate YU-SAH occurred at a regular route Ljubljana - Susak on Tuesday 12 September 1933, at 6:21 am, shortly after plane took off from the airport in Ljubljana. Weather conditions at the airport that morning were fine. The plane has been scheduled to take off at 6.10am but with the engines on, it waited on the tarmac for a passenger that was late. Plane took off with a 9-minute delay at 6.19am. Immediately after takeoff, the plane crashed in the woods with a tremendous crash, only one kilometer from the airport, hitting a drop in the stone wall of the hospital at the well. There were eight persons on the flight, two crew members and six passengers. All persons on board were killed outright. The flight crew consisted of a pilot Viktor Nikitin and a mechanic Spiro Trkulja. This was the first plane crash of Aeroput, which occurred six years since the founding of the airline.

A member of the Command Air Force formed to investigate the causes of the plane crash, Mr.Stojanovic said: "... material is not to blame. Departing was performed after a regular review and under normal circumstances. Guilt may be up to fog and its uneven formation on the upper surface, or a fatal error in pilotage, as one can not believe, knowing the extraordinary abilities of Nikitin, as a good, serious and conscientious pilot."

Pilot Viktor Nikitin was buried at the Orthodox cemetery Zemun, September 15, 1933, with all the honors that belong to him as a respectable citizen, soldier, pilot and man. At the accident site, a memorial plaque with the names of the victims was installed.

=== Family ===
Yuri (George) was the only son after the death of his father. He graduated from high school in Zemun and then the 64th class of the Military Academy in Belgrade 1939, then served in the artillery.

After the collapse of the Yugoslav Royal Army in the April war access units World War II, and after the war, he served in the JNA armored units as well as active-duty officer. After the war, George had two sons, of whom the elder Aleksandar headed his grandfather's footsteps. He became a JAT pilot who continued the tradition of a pre-war Aeroput which flew his grandfather Viktor. For the 50-year anniversary of the first flight of Aeroput, on the Belgrade-Zagreb route, plane piloted by Aleksandar Nikitin, this has symbolically marked the anniversary. Today, Nikitin family photo albums are kept at the Serbian National Aviation museum next to the Nikola Tesla airport in Belgrade.
