= Jat Tehnika =

One-Stop-Shop, MRO based in Belgrade

- One-Stop-Shop MRO
- Native name: Јат - Tехника (Jat - Tehnika)
- Type: d.o.o.
- Industry: Aerospace, MRO
- Founded: 1 January 2006; 20 years ago (Current form); Traces back to Aeroput, founded in 1927
- Headquarters: Aerodrom Beograd 59, Belgrade, Serbia
- Key people: Aleš Luci (Chief Executive Officer); Marija Dozet(Chief Financial Officer)
- Services: Base - Line and Engine Maintenance, Components, Calibration, and Special Services.
- Number of employees: 600 (2025)
- Website: jat-tech.rs
- Footnotes; Business ID: 20029188; Tax ID: 103831652

Jat Tehnika (Serbian: Јат - Tехника) is a one-stop-shop integrated MRO based in Belgrade, Republic of Serbia, with additional stations for line maintenance in Podgorica & Tivat (Montenegro), and Skopje (North Macedonia).

With certificates including: EASA PART 145.0304, FAA YSMY254, EASA Part - 21J, Jat Tehnika offers complementary solutions with competitive terms.

JAT Tehnika upholds values like safety, quality, flexibility, efficiency, and TAT, guaranteeing superior maintenance services and operational excellence for airlines.

== History ==
The origins of Jat Tehnika date back to the creation of Aeroput in 1927.

Serbian mechanics pose next to a Farman MF.11, Corfu, March 1916

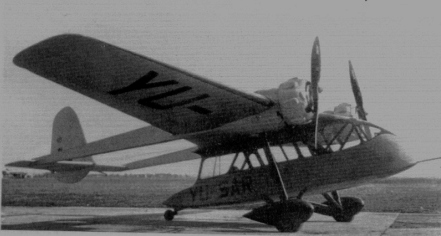
Aeroput MMS-3 made in Aeroput workshops in Zemun, 1935

The first technicians and mechanics started working as pioneers of this profession in 1927. The airline AEROPUT changed the name into JAT (Yugoslav Airlines) in 1947 as the successor of Aeroput. In 1963, a jet engine fleet was introduced. The first wide body DC-10 aircraft arrived in 1978, followed by the new technology aircraft 737-300 in 1984.

The next big step was in 2006, when Jat Tehnika was founded as a spin-off of the company Jat Airways.

Jat Tehnika received its PART-145 certificate from the European Aviation Safety Agency (EASA)on 15 May 2006., allowing the company to maintain all aircraft from the European Union. The company obtained a certificate from the American Federal Aviation Administration (FAA) to service airlines from the United States 7 February 2007.

In July 2019, the Government of Serbia announced auction of the company, with plans to sell its 99.4% share in company's ownership. On 28 November 2019, the Government of Serbia accepted the offer of Czech-Polish group "Avia Prime" to take over the company for 10.30 million euros.

== Jat Tehnika services ==
=== Line maintenance ===
Line Maintenance Department provides line maintenance services. Also, it provides operation of line station and main base in Belgrade (Serbia) as well as line stations and technical bases: Skopje (North Macedonia), Podgorica and Tivat (Montenegro)

=== Base maintenance ===
Jat Tehnika Base Maintenance offers comprehensive maintenance, repair and overhaul services on Boeing 737 Classic/Next Generation, ATR 42/72 and Airbus A320 family.

=== Component maintenance department ===
Component Maintenance Department consists of seven Workshops, Engineering Production Bureau, and the Support Unit. Radio Workshop is responsible for maintenance of components from navigation, communications, microwaves, and auto flight systems using automatic test equipment to perform more accurate troubleshooting and fault isolation. Instrument Workshop covers testing, repair, and overhaul of various types of sensors, transmitters, indicators, Air Data Computers and Cabin Pressure Controllers. It also has capabilities for maintenance of gyroscopic instruments, such as vertical and horizontal gyros. Complete maintenance and readout of Flight Data Recorders is performed in this workshop. Maintenance of oxygen bottles, crew and passenger oxygen masks together with Passenger Service Units (PSU) is responsibility of the Oxygen Workshop, which is a part of Instrument Workshop. Electric Workshop performs maintenance of various control boxes, relays, components from distribution system of electrical power, electrical starters and generators, electrical harnesses, fire detection sensors, batteries, and other electrical units. Pneumatic Workshop is in charge of components from pneumatic, air-conditioning, pressurization, anti-icing, de-icing, engine bleed, and engine starting systems. Hydraulic and Mechanical Components Workshop is divided into two parts. The first part is responsible for maintenance of components from hydraulic, flight controls, and fuel systems such as actuators, hydraulic modules, and various types of pumps. The second part deals with gearboxes and other components from flight control systems, together with all types of fire extinguishers, command cables, pipes, and hoses. Landing Gear workshop covers repair and maintenance of landing gears, wheels and brakes. Test Equipment and Calibration Workshop is responsible for maintenance and calibration of tools, equipment, and test equipment. It has accreditation of national standard institutions and traceability to international standards. Support Unit provides logistics in documentation and materials flow in whole department. Engineering Production Bureau is responsible for providing engineering and technological support to workshops from Component Maintenance Department. Its duties are to keep maintenance of components in accordance with the latest requirements of manufacturers and relevant authorities.

=== Engineering department ===
Jat Tehnika Engineering offers EASA PART 21 Design Organization services, Maintenance Programs Development, Auditing and Consulting services and Contracted Continuous Airworthiness Maintenance Organization (CAMO) services.

== Facilities ==
The base facility of Jat Tehnika at Belgrade Nikola Tesla Airport consists of three equipped hangars. The first is designed for line-maintenance tasks as well as for troubleshooting operations, and can carry up to three medium-sized planes each (such as the DC-9 and Boeing 727). There is also one hangar designed for aircraft overhaul which can carry up to three medium-sized planes (such as the B737-300), including annexes for all aircraft components shop maintenance. The facility also consists of one large aircraft hangar designed for the maintenance of large long-range planes with a space capacity of 9,000 sqm. It is able to fit up to three DC-10s or MD-11s or two Boeing 747-400s.

== Approvals and certificates ==
Jat Tehnika is approved in several countries and aviation authorities for the maintenance of aircraft, engines and components; also holds approvals for PART 21 Design Organisation, Equipment and Tools Calibration and Technical Training. The company has received the relevant certification from the countries/aviation authorities concerned.

== Jat Airways dispute ==
On 30 September 2009, Jat Airways was forced to suspend operations because Jat Tehnika refused to perform any further work on their aircraft as Jat Airways had accumulated unpaid bills amounting to RSD100,000,000 (€1,000,000 or US$1,450,000).
