= F300 =

F300 or F.300 may refer to:

- Farman F.300, a 1930 French airliner
- Ferrari F300, a 1998 Italian Formula One car
