= F310 =

F310 or F.310 may refer to:

- Ferrari F310, a 1996 Italian Formula One racing car
- Farman F.310, a 1930 French airliner
- HNoMS Fridtjof Nansen (F310), a Royal Norwegian Navy frigate
- F-310, a fuel additive introduced by the Chevron Corporation in 1970, and subsequently withdrawn from the market
- F-310, a gamepad manufactured and marketed by Logitech
