= Air transport in Yugoslavia =

This article provides an overview of air transport in Yugoslavia, a country in the Balkans that existed from 1918 until its dissolution in the 1990s.

Public air transport in the interwar period was organised by privately owned Aeroput. The company's post-war operations were suspended due to nationalization and near total fleet destruction during the war. The first plan for the post-war public air transport reconstruction was introduced by the Commission for the Economic Reconstruction on 28 December 1944. The plan envisaged the national network which would include Belgrade, Zagreb, Ljubljana, Sarajevo, Titograd, Skopje, Novi Sad, Kraljevo, Niš, Borovo, Rijeka, Zadar, Split, Dubrovnik, Banja Luka, Mostar, Maribor and Trieste.

Initial charter public flights were organised by military planes while the first regular international line was introduced on 6 October 1945 between Belgrade and Prague. The initial public fleet was organised by 4 old German planes (Junkers Ju 52) and 4 Tukans purchased in France in 1945-46. In August 1945 Yugoslavia received 11 Soviet Lisunov-Li 2, but their usage was quickly discontinued in international and partially domestic transport due to safety concerns. Yugoslavia therefore initiated purchase of 10 American excess and therefore cheap C-47 planes in 1946. However, as Yugoslavia at the time was still a close Soviet ally, the US rejected the proposal, pushing Yugoslavia to purchase three DC-3 in Belgium which will be the basic type of planes in Yugoslav public fleet all up until 1960's. Yugoslav national public transport air company JAT Airways was established in April 1947.

== Airlines ==
The first domestic airliner was Aeroput, the predecessor of JAT (Jugoslovenski Aerotransport) created in 1927, which was Yugoslavia's national carrier until the country's dissolution. More airlines were founded during the 1960s, namely Ljubljana-based Adria Airways (initially named Adria Aviopromet, later Inex-Adria Airways), and the Belgrade-based Aviogenex in 1968. During the late 1980s and 1990s a big number of private companies were established.

== Airports ==
The first airports in Yugoslavia were created in the first half of the twentieth century. The airline industry and infrastructure was substantially expanded between the 1950s and 1980s. In 1964 there were seven international airports in Yugoslavia. Until the end of 1970 there were 14 modern airports in Yugoslavia: Belgrade, Zagreb, Ljubljana, Pula, Rijeka, Split, Dubrovnik, Titograd, Mostar, Zadar, Priština, Skoplje, Sarajevo and Ohrid.

=== List of airports ===
Yugoslavia contained the following passenger airports, listed here grouped by the country or territory in which they are now located:

Bosnia and Herzegovina

- Banja Luka Airport, Banja Luka
- Mostar Airport, Mostar
- Sarajevo Airport, Sarajevo
- Tuzla Airport, Tuzla

Croatia

- Bol Airport, Bol
- Dubrovnik Airport, Dubrovnik
- Lošinj Airport, Mali Lošinj
- Osijek Airport, Osijek
- Pula Airport, Pula
- Rijeka Airport, Rijeka
- Split Airport, Split
- Zadar Airport, Zadar
- Zagreb Airport, Zagreb

North Macedonia

- Ohrid Airport, Ohrid
- Skopje Airport, Skopje

Montenegro

- Podgorica Airport, Podgorica
- Tivat Airport, Tivat

Serbia

- Belgrade Airport, Belgrade
- Niš Airport, Niš
- Priština Airport, Priština

Slovenia

- Ljubljana Airport, Ljubljana
- Maribor Airport, Maribor
- Portorož Airport, Portorož

== Legacy ==
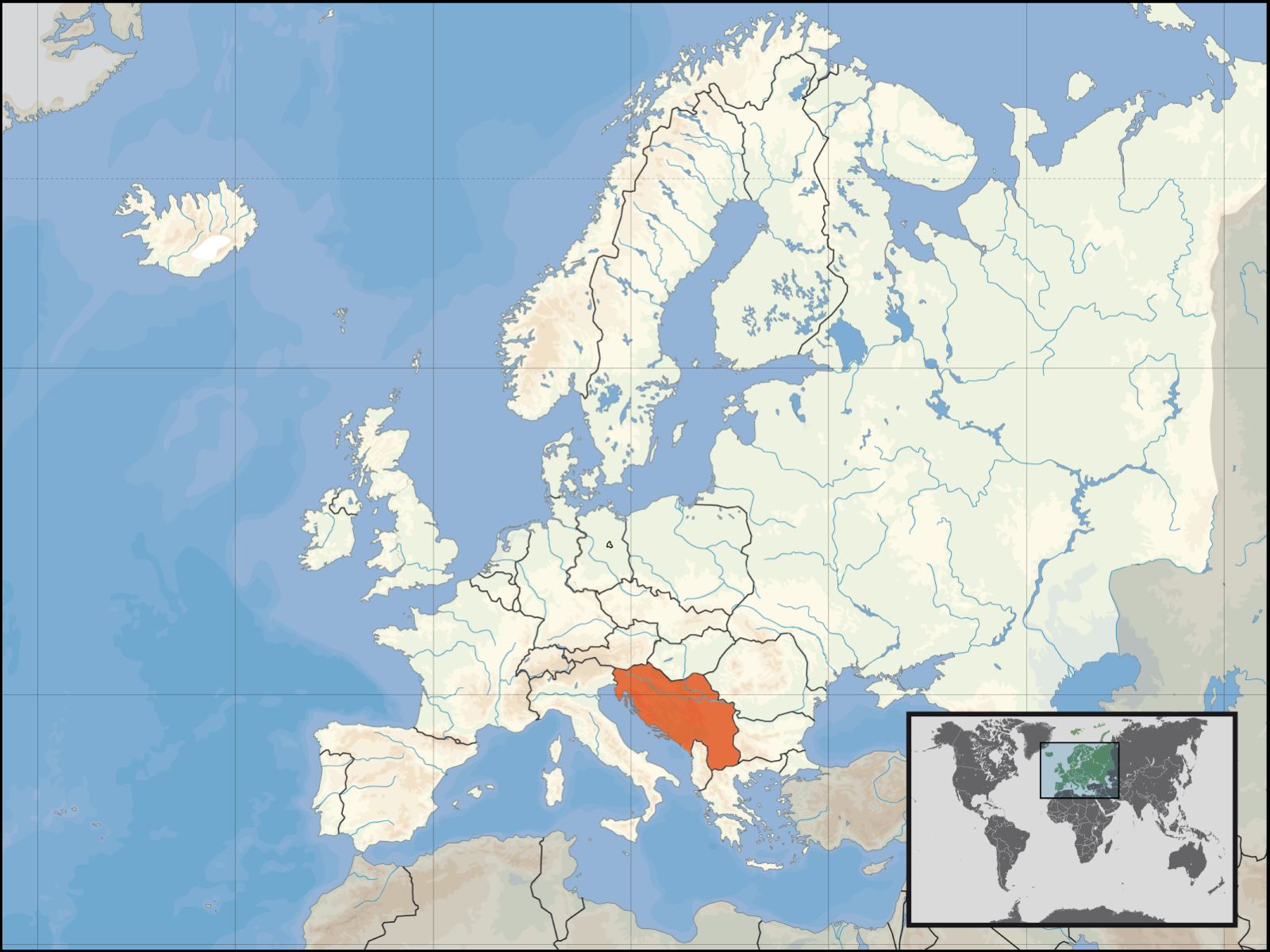
Political map of the former Yugoslavia

After the dissolution of Yugoslavia, each successor country created its own national carrier. During this period, the Yugoslav Wars and the economical sanctions imposed on Yugoslavia significantly contributed to the crisis in the airline sector. After 2000, the growth of the airline industry slightly recovered following the recovery of the tourism sector. The national carriers of the former Yugoslav countries are:

- Bosnia and Herzegovina: B&H Airlines (defunct)
- Croatia: Croatia Airlines
- Macedonia: MAT Airways (defunct)
- Montenegro: Montenegro Airlines (defunct)
- Serbia: Air Serbia
- Slovenia: Adria Airways (defunct)

Each country also has a number of privately owned airlines, as well as a number of international airlines with regular flights to airports in the countries of the former Yugoslavia.

== See also ==
- List of airports in Bosnia and Herzegovina
- List of airports in Croatia
- List of airports in Kosovo
- List of airports in Macedonia
- List of airports in Montenegro
- List of airports and airstrips in Serbia
- List of airports in Slovenia
