= Bogojević Selo =

Bogojević Selo Богојевић Село
- Village
- Location within Bosnia and Herzegovina
- Coordinates: 42°38′N 18°27′E
- Country: Bosnia and Herzegovina
- Entity: Republika Srpska
- Municipality: Trebinje
- Time zone: UTC+1 (CET)
  - Summer (DST): UTC+2 (CEST)

Bogojević Selo (Serbian Cyrillic: Богојевић Село) is a Serbian village in the municipality of Trebinje, Republika Srpska, Bosnia and Herzegovina.

== Geography ==
The village is located near the international border crossings with Croatia and Montenegro.

== Demographics ==
In 1991, the village had 68 inhabitants, all of whom declared as Serbs.

== People ==
- Luka Vukalović, rebel
- Tripko Vukalović, rebel
