= Valjevo Airfield =

Airfield in Divci, Serbia

Valjevo Airfield Divci Airfield
- IATA: none; ICAO: LYVA

Summary
- Airport type: Public
- Owner: Government of Serbia
- Serves: Valjevo
- Location: Divci, Serbia
- Elevation AMSL: 469 ft (143 m)
- Coordinates: 44°17′52.14″N 20°01′18.88″E

Map
- Location within Serbia

Runways
Direction	Length		Surface
Direction	ft	m	Surface
08/26	4,101	1,250	Grass

Valjevo Airfield (Serbian: Аеродром Ваљево / Aerodrom Valjevo), also known as Divci Airfield (Serbian: Аеродром Дивци / Aerodrom Divci), is a recreational aerodrome in Divci near the City of Valjevo, Serbia and mountain resort Divčibare. The field has a single grass runway that is 1,250 metres long and 50 metres wide.

== Gallery ==
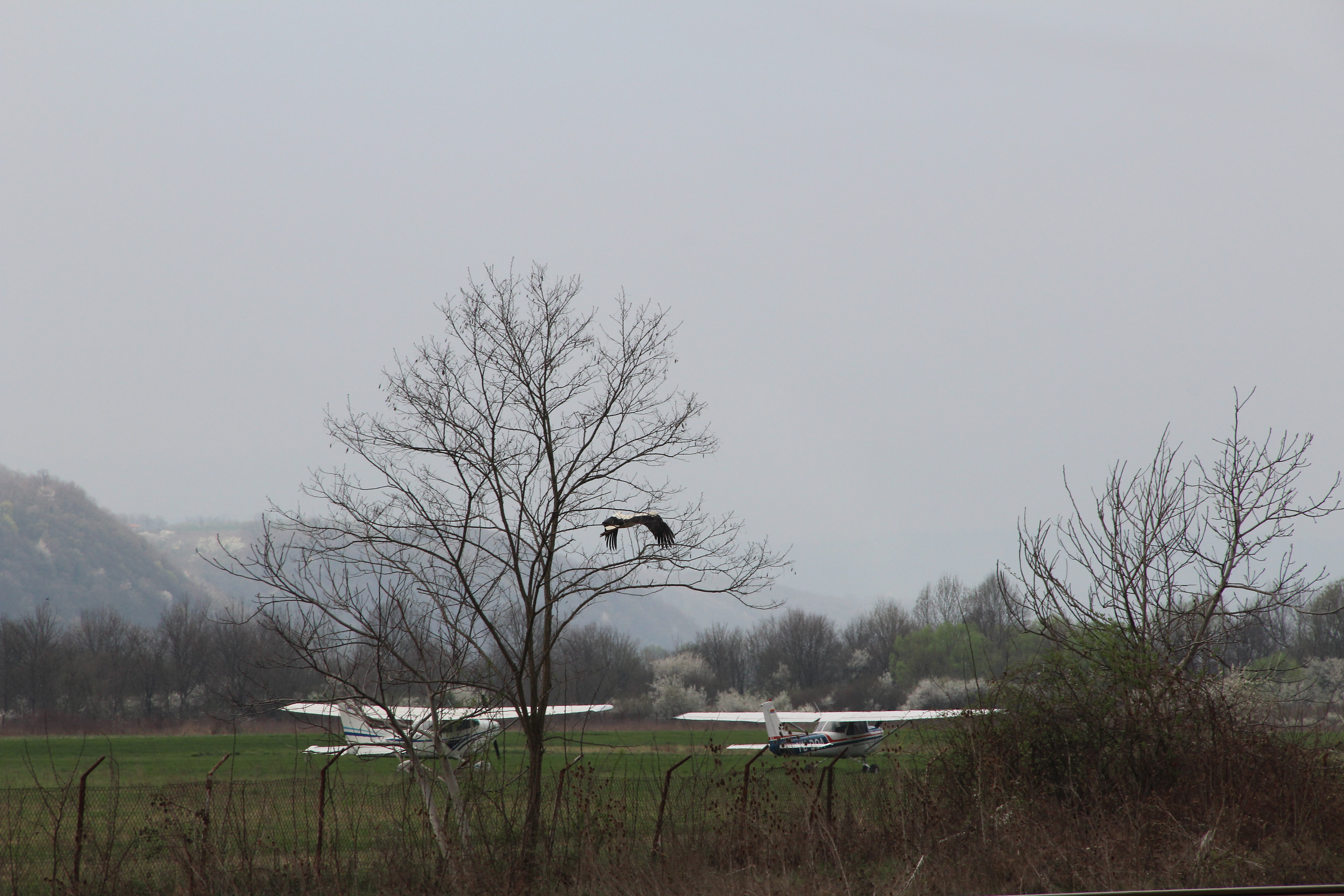

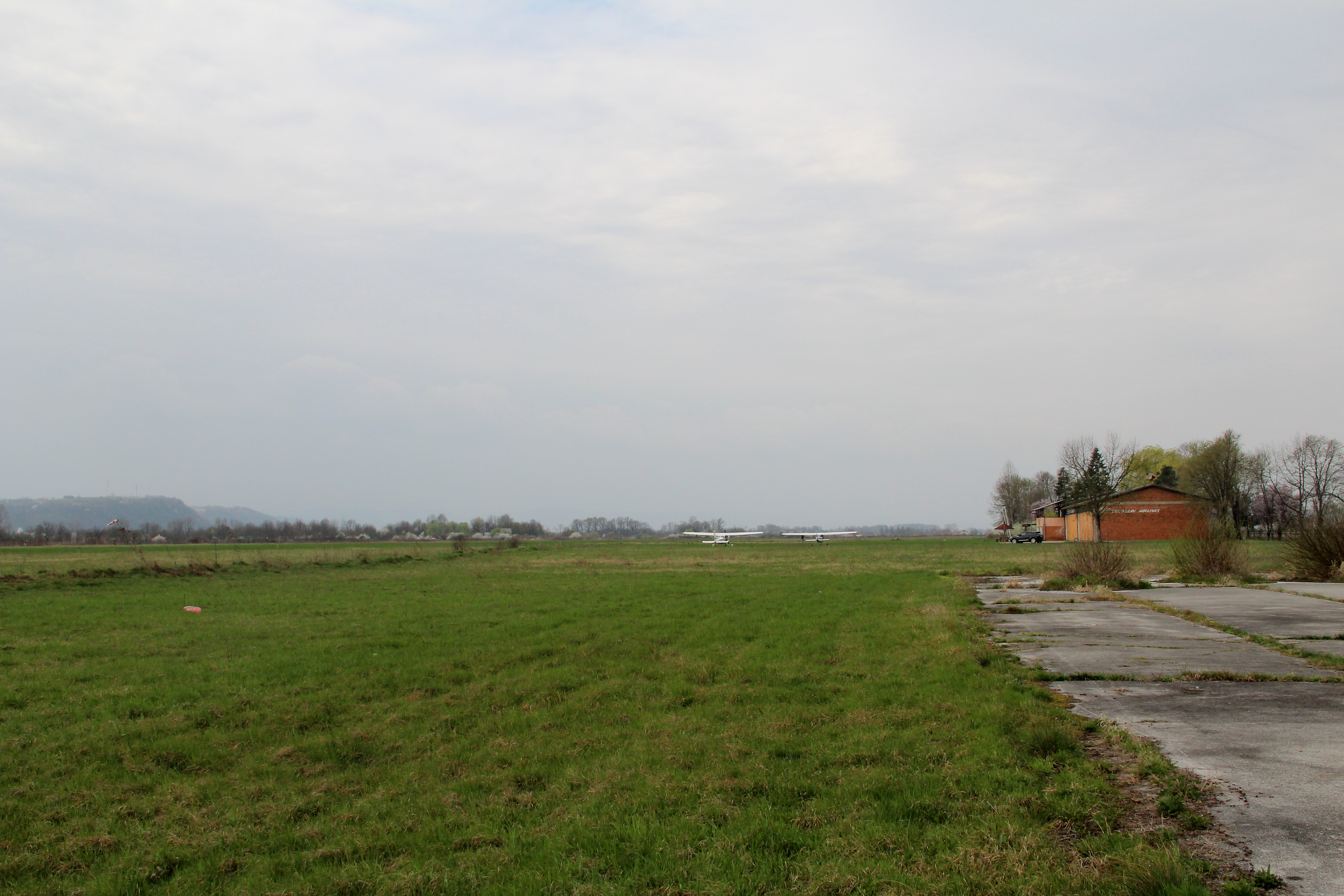

== See also ==
- List of airports in Serbia
