= Divci (Valjevo) =

Divci Дивци
- Village
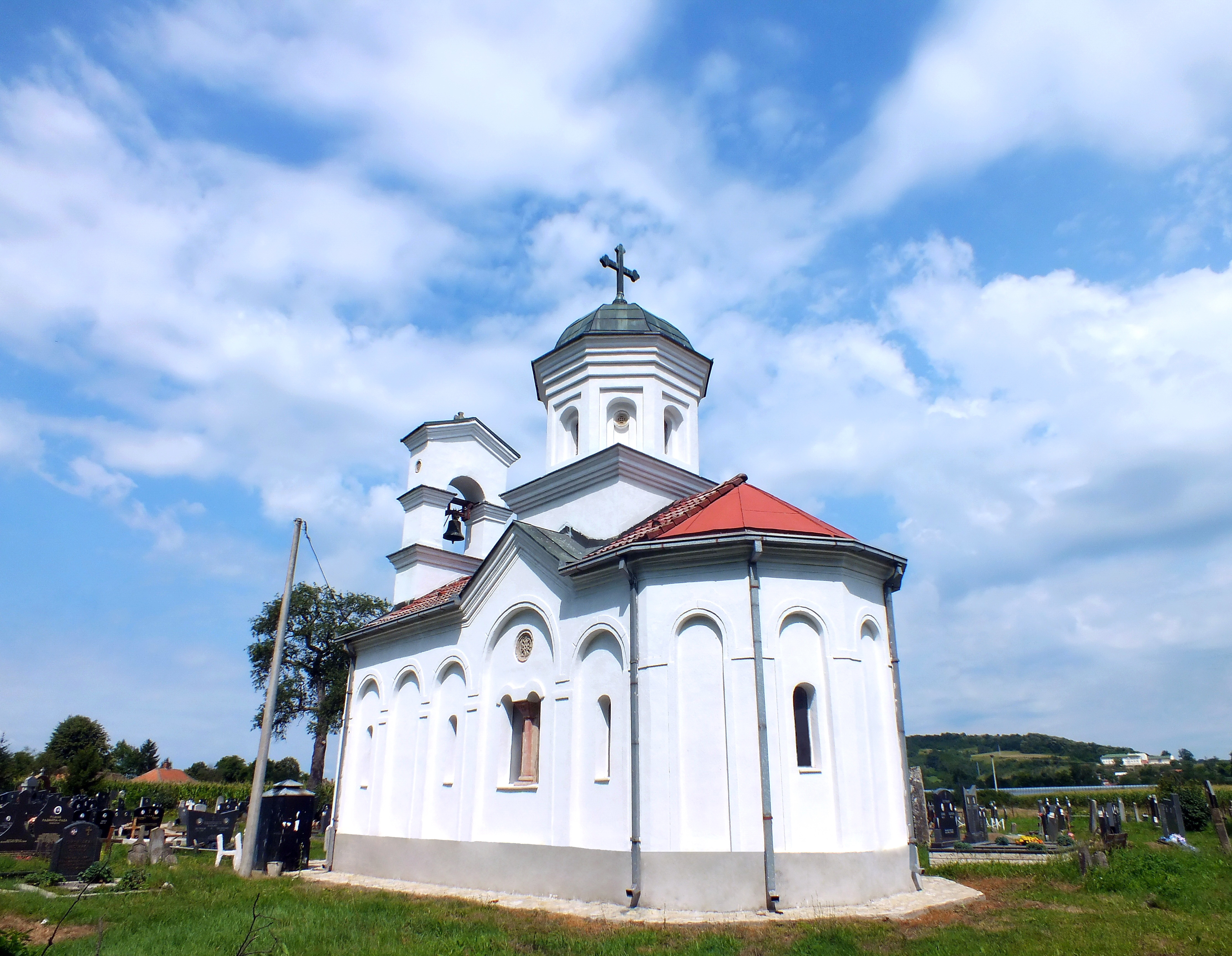

- Location within Serbia
- Coordinates: 44°18′N 20°01′E
- Country: Serbia
- District: Kolubara District
- Municipality: Valjevo

Population (2002)
  - Total: 717
- Time zone: UTC+1 (CET)
  - Summer (DST): UTC+2 (CEST)

Divci is a village in the municipality of Valjevo, Serbia. According to the 2002 population census, the village has a population of 717 people.

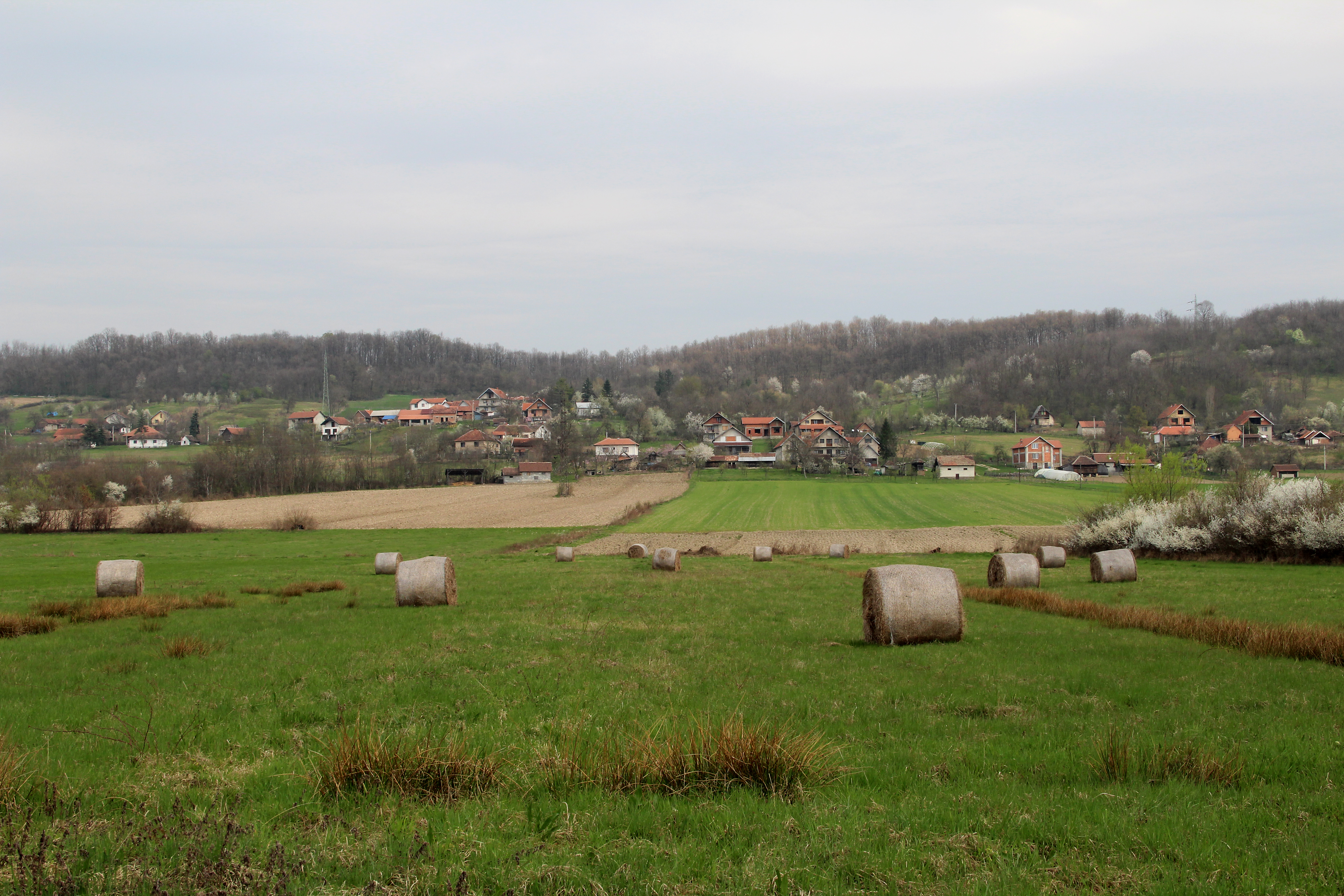
Divci - panorama

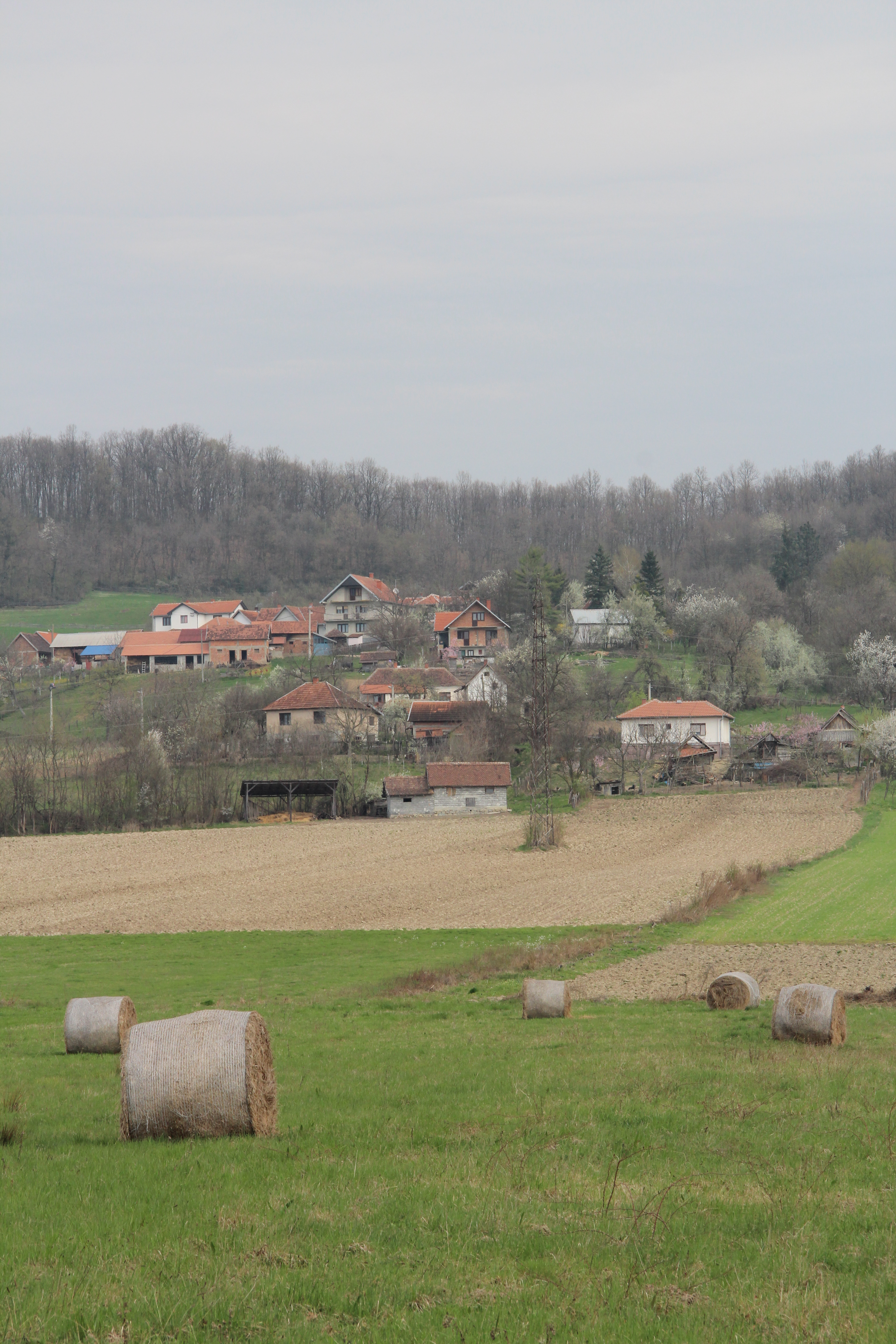
Divci - panorama

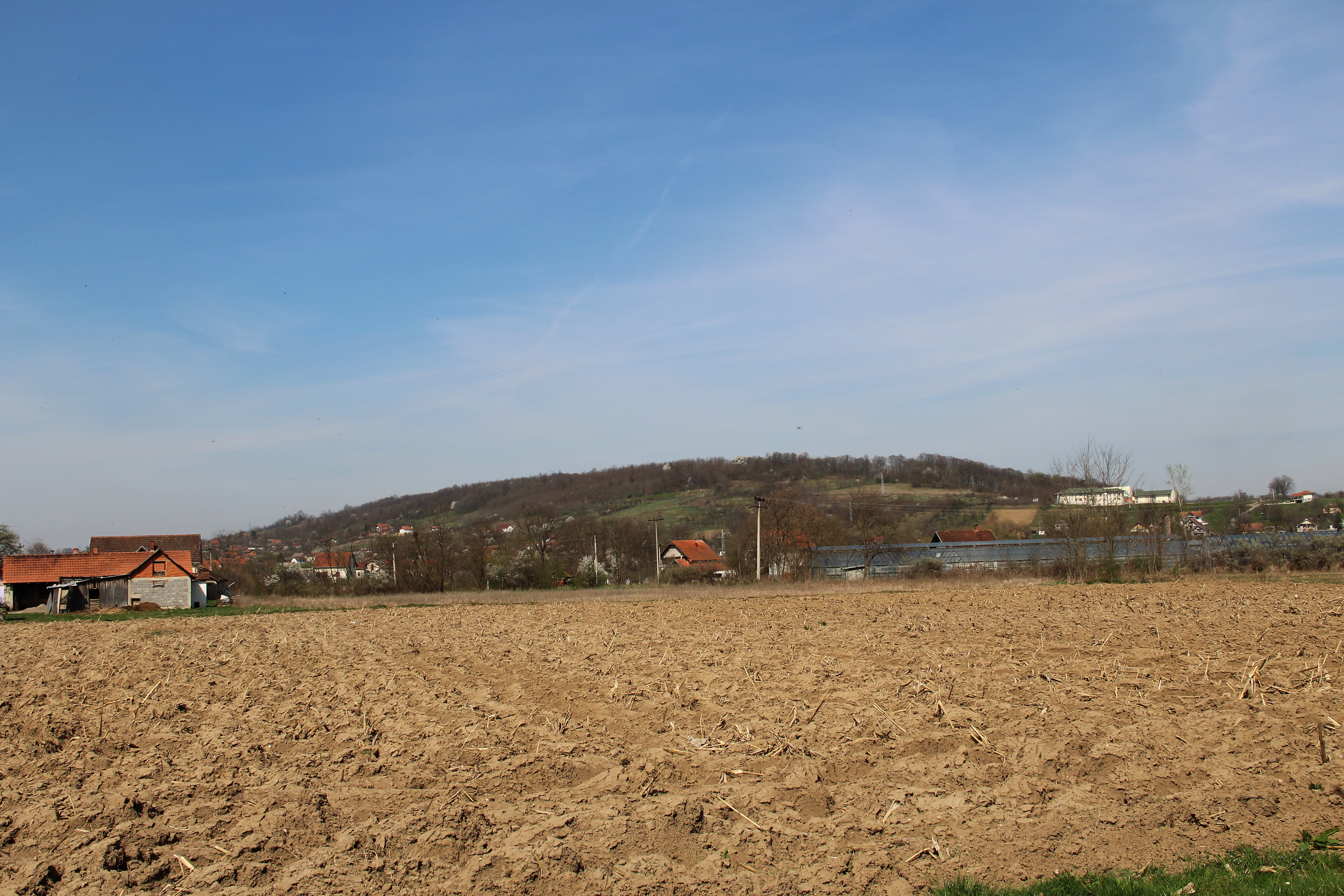
Divci - panorama

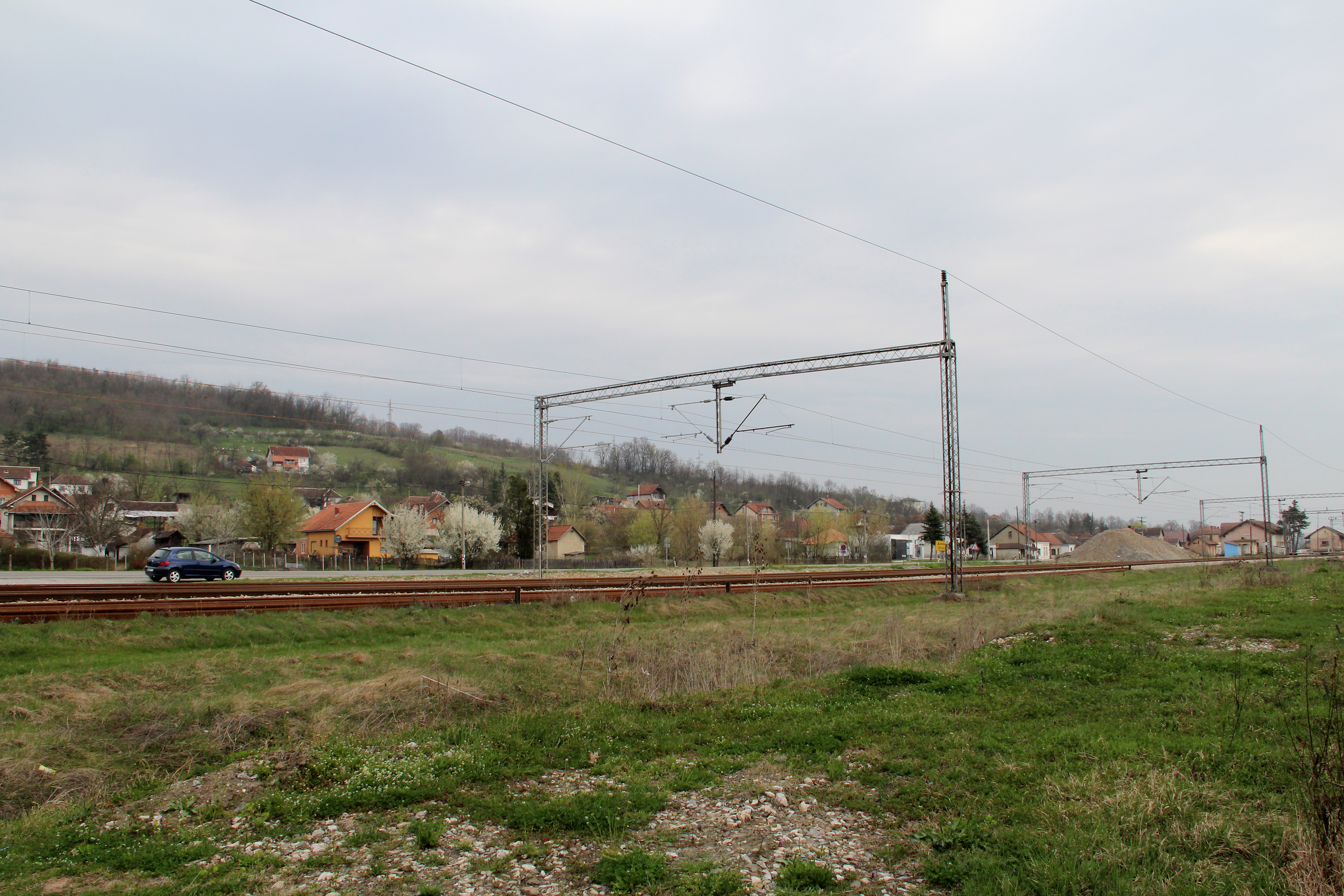
Divci – panorama

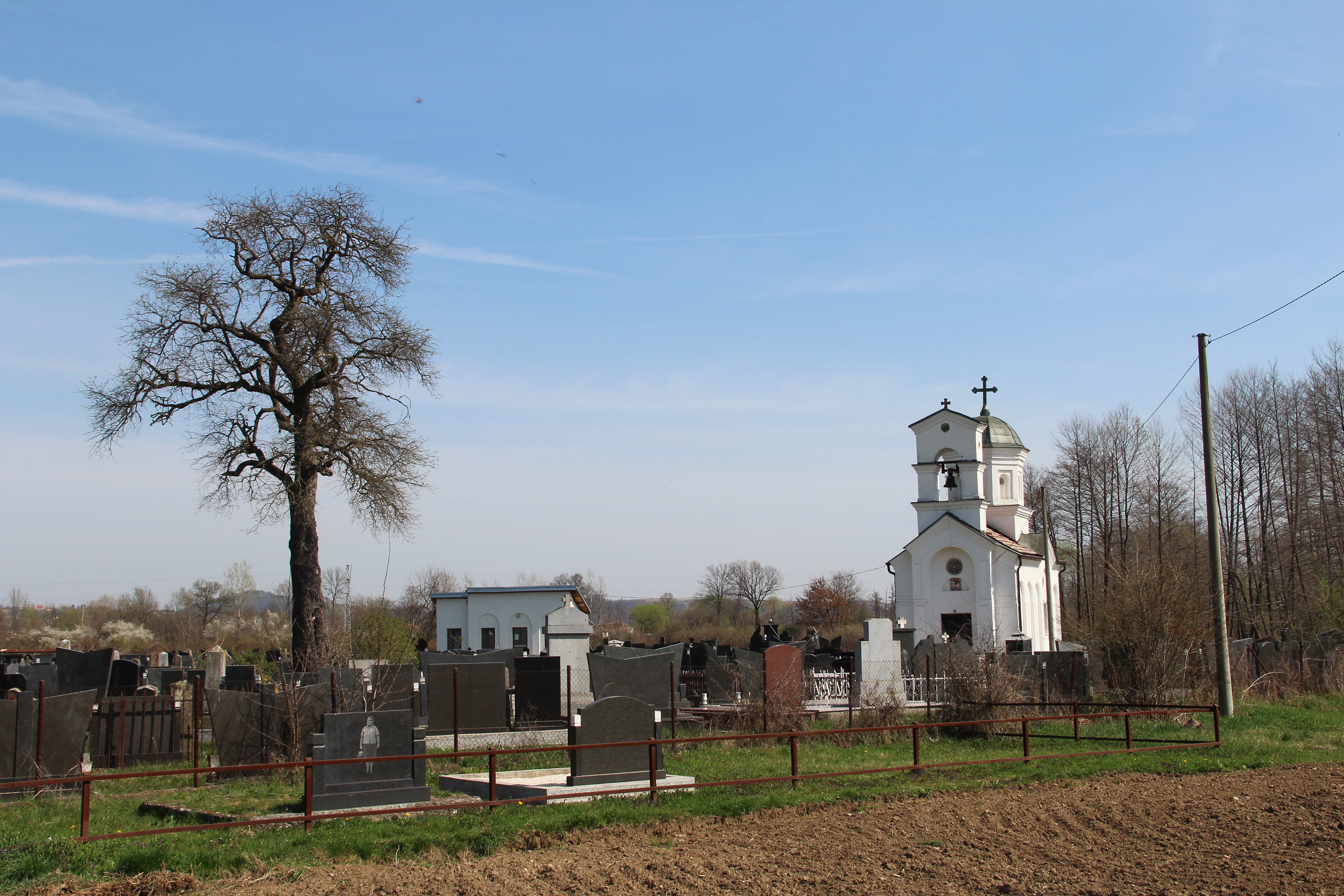
Divci - Church and village cemetery

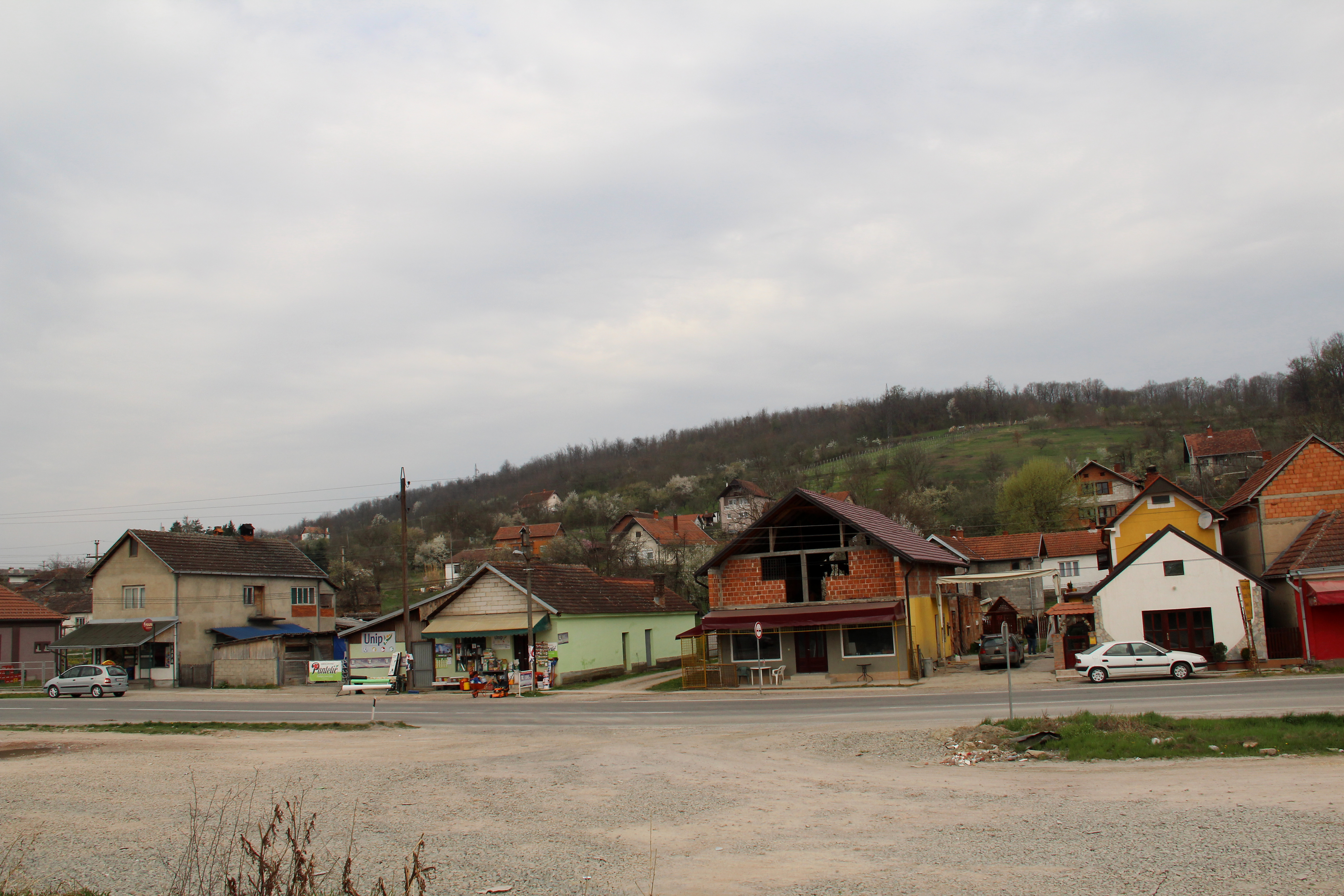
Divci - panorama- center

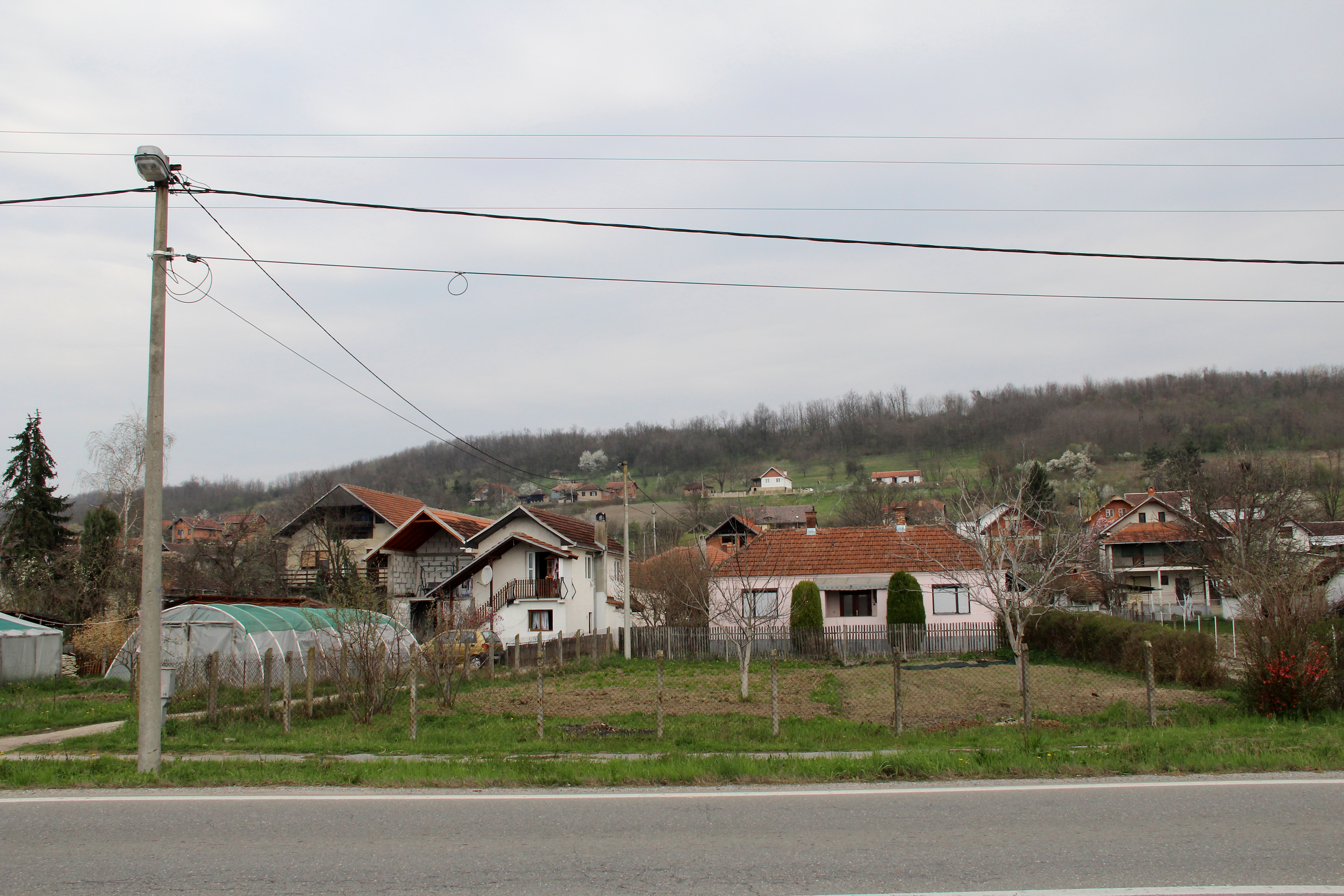
Divci - panorama- center

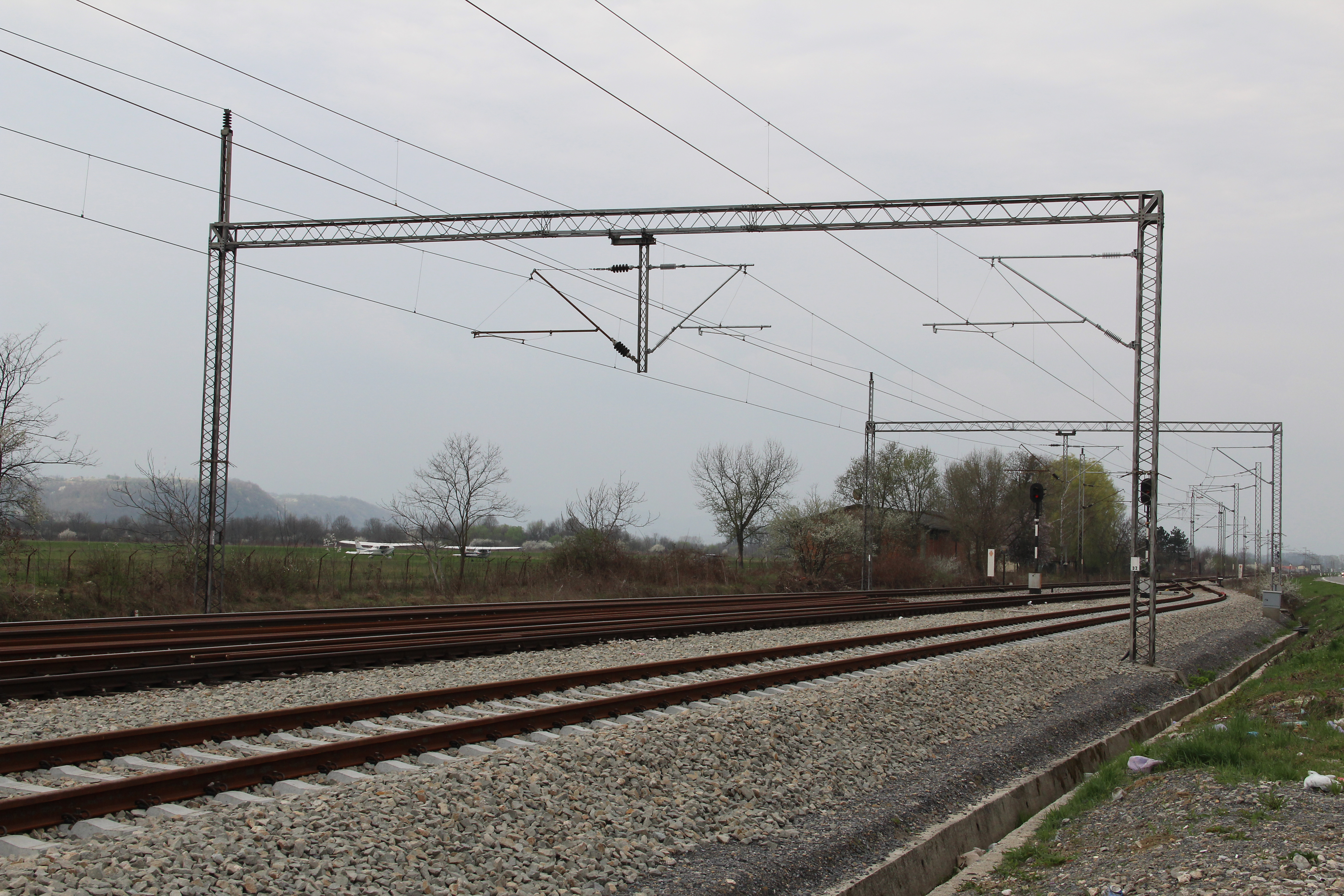
Divci - railroad Belgrade - Bar

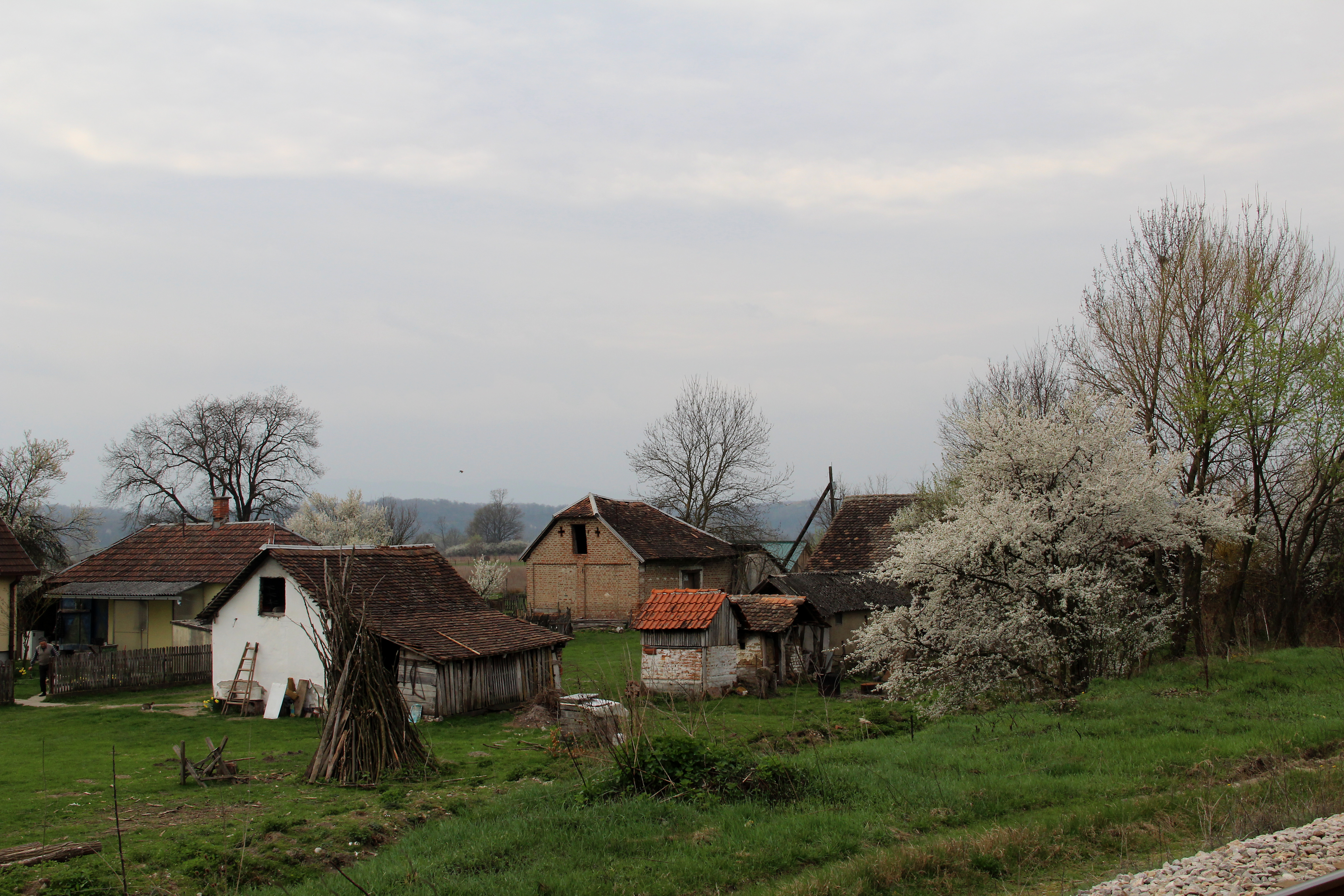
Divci - rural property

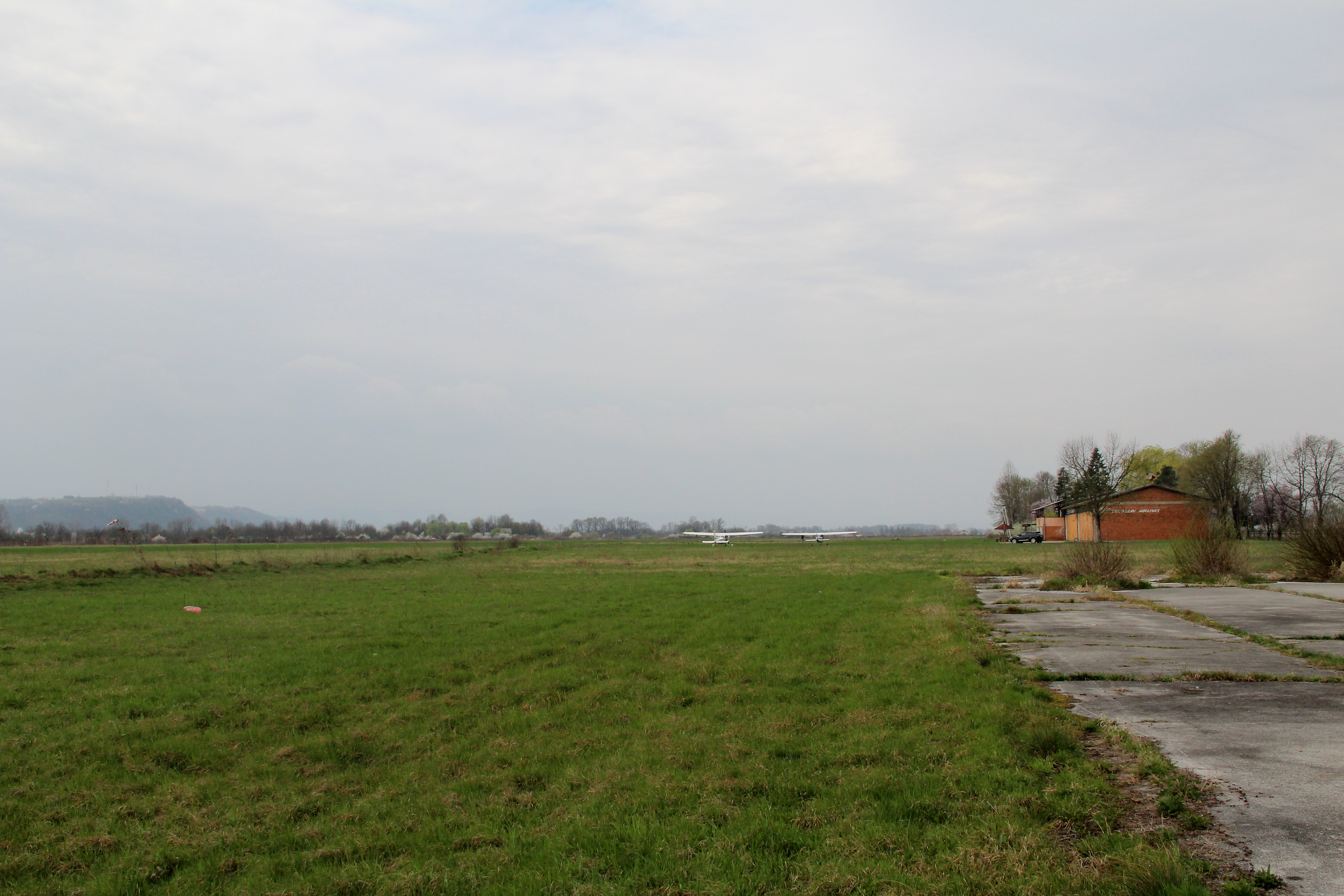
Divci - a sports airport

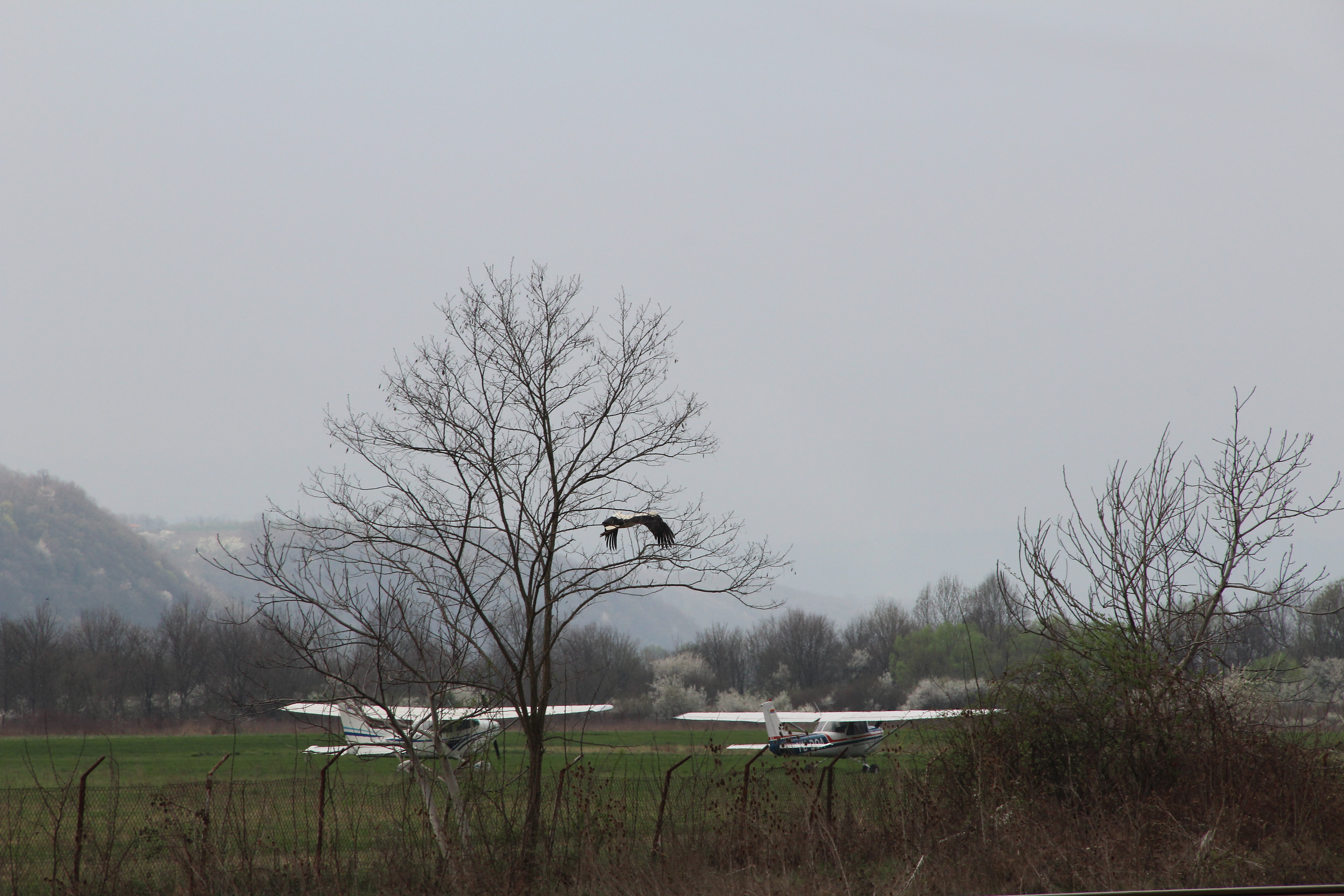
Divci - a sports airport

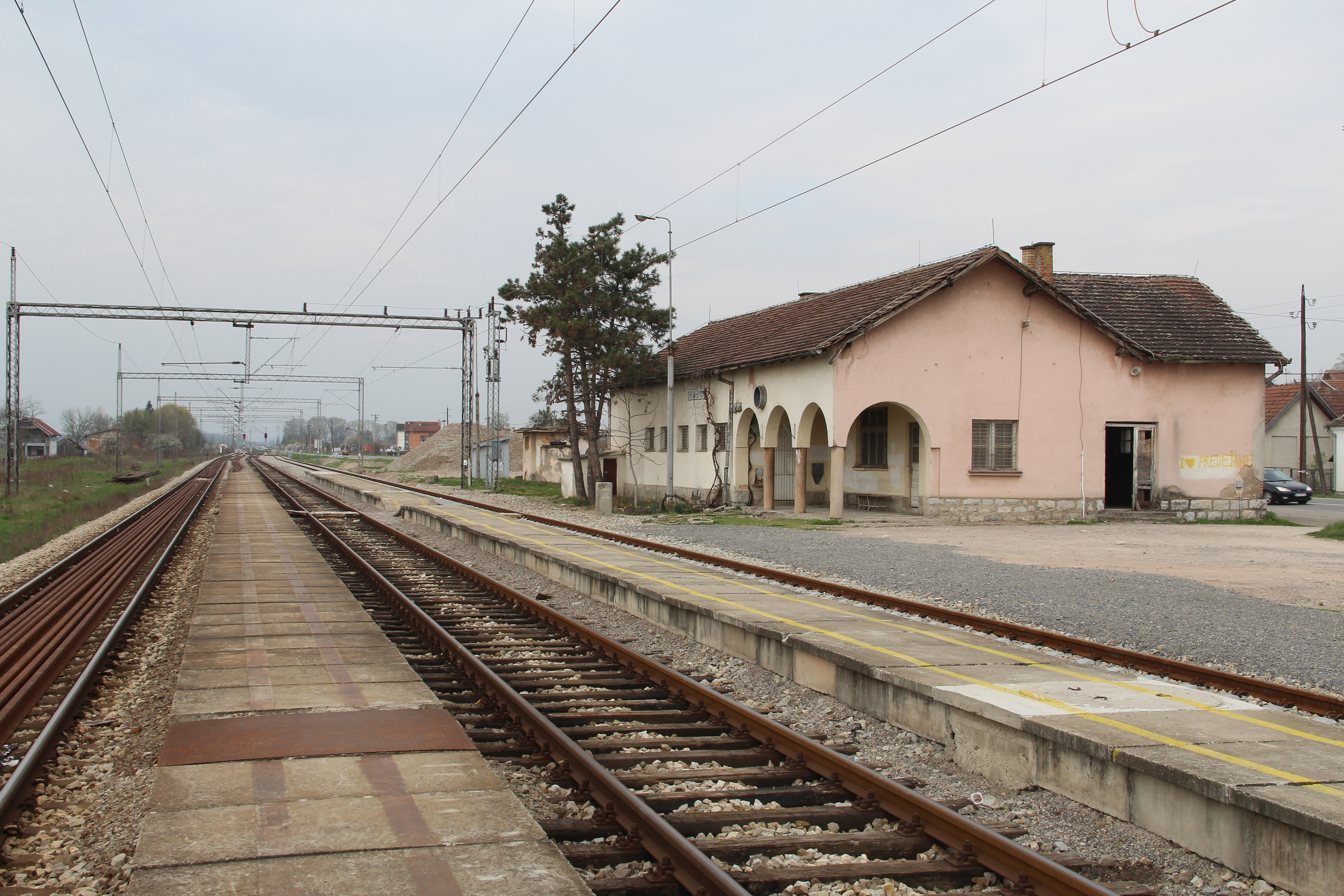
Divci - Railroad station

== See also ==
- Divci Airport
