= Aeroput =

National airline of Yugoslavia (1927–1948)

- Founded: 17 June 1927; 99 years ago
- Commenced operations: 15 February 1928; 98 years ago
- Ceased operations: 24 December 1948; 77 years ago (became Jat Airways)

Aeroput (Serbian Cyrillic: Аеропут, lit. 'Airway') was an airline and flag carrier of Yugoslavia from 1927 until 1948.

Society for Air traffic AD Aeroput was the first Serbian company for civil air traffic, which was founded on 17 June 1927 as Društvo za Vazdušni Saobraćaj "Aeroput" (English: Society for Air Traffic "Aeroput"), in the palace of the Adriatic-Danube Bank in Belgrade. Aeroput was the national carrier of the Kingdom of SHS, and then the Kingdom of Yugoslavia. Aeroput was among the first civilian aircraft carriers, being the 10th airline company founded in Europe and the 21st in the world. The airline ceased to exist during World War II in Yugoslavia, but was renewed after the war under the new name Jugoslovenski Aerotransport (abbreviated JAT; English: Yugoslav Air Transport) and still flies today as the Serbian national air carrier under the name Air Serbia.

== Background and founding ==
In 1913, the Kingdom of Serbia passed a regulation concerning air transport, becoming one of the first countries to do so. The forerunners of scheduled civil flights in Serbia were military postal services, as in other countries which participated in World War I. Several flights were organized in Thessaloniki, where pilots of the First Serbian Squadron, carried mail between Skopje and Thessaloniki. In 1919, postal air services between Novi Sad, Belgrade, Sarajevo, Mostar and Zagreb were operated with Breguet 14 aircraft, and they carried individual passengers. One was converted to a passenger plane for four passengers, but did not end up being used for that purpose.

In 1926, the administration of the Aero-club of the Kingdom of SCS, founded in 1921 by the pilots of the Thessaloniki front, calculated the costs and performed administrative activities needed to establish an air transport company. A group of businesspeople gathered in the State Mortgage Bank in Belgrade decided in February of that year to establish a founding committee for the establishment of a company by the name of Air Transport Company, plc (Društvo za vazdušni saobraćaj, a. d.). In April, 24,000 shares were authorised, and in January 1927, a contract was signed with the government regulating subsidies, tariffs, and airport usage rights. The contract also allowed the government to approve annual route and pricing plans and choose the aircraft the company was allowed to use, and obligated the company to open a route between Belgrade and Zagreb. This, as well as the fact the government had a representative at all board and shareholder meetings, meant that, despite the company legally being structured as a private joint-stock company, the government still exercised significant control over it.

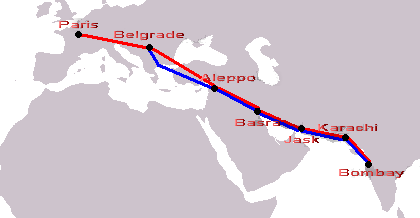
Route of the 1927 transcontinental flight

The sale of shares, though initially slow, was greatly accelerated by three events in the spring of 1927. Namely, late March saw the opening of a new airport in the Bežanijska kosa suburb of Belgrade, and Charles Lindbergh completed his historical solo flight across the Atlantic in May. Additionally, military pilot Tadija Sondermajer, a member of the company's administration, suggested that he and Leonid Bajdak, another military pilot, fly from Paris to Bombay as a publicity stunt. They took off from Paris on 20 April, flying a Potez 25 aircraft. Upon their landing in Belgrade on May 2, they were greeted by a crowd of 30.000 people, and share sales jumped significantly, thus saving the company from potentially being legally required to dissolve. On 17 June 1927, the company was officially incorporated by the Belgrade Commercial Court, with Tadija Sondermajer as general director.

== Early years ==
Throughout 1927, the company hired three pilots (Vladimir Strzhizhevsky, Viktor Nikitin, and Mikhailo Yaroshenko), three mechanics, and an airport manager each at Belgrade and Zagreb airport. The airline also ordered four Potez 29-2 aircraft, the first of which, christened "Belgrade" arrived on 4 February 1928, the other three arriving by the end of the month. The first flight from Belgrade to Zagreb was announced for 15 February, and several Belgrade journalists and photographers were selected to be the first passengers. Despite bad weather and technical issues, the aircraft, piloted by Strzhizhevsky, took off, albeit over an hour late. No new routes would be opened by the end of 1928, and the total number of passengers between Belgrade and Zagreb that year totaled 1,322. Nearly four times more income came from government subsidies than from direct revenue that year, and as the subsidies were not greatly increased the following year, it only saw two new changes to the route network – the inauguration of a domestic flight from Belgrade to Skoplje, and the extension of the Belgrade to Zagreb flight to Graz and Vienna, operated in cooperation with Austroflug and CIDNA. However, two more Potez 29 aircraft were added to the fleet that year, bringing the total aircraft count to six. They transported a total of 1,787 passengers in 1929.

== History ==
In March 1930, the government signed an amendment to their previous agreement. The same year, new flights were introduced from Belgrade to Thessaloniki via Skopje Airport (which the company could now use free of charge thanks to the amended agreement). The company posted its highest passenger count thus far that year. By then, Aeroput connected Belgrade and Zagreb with routed to all other major domestic centers in the interior and the coast of the Adriatic. Initially, the fleet consisted of three Potez 29/2 biplanes with five passenger seats. In 1932 Aeroput expanded its fleet with Farman F.306 aircraft, and in 1934 the company purchased three Spartan Cruiser II planes. Aeroput also bought two Caudron C.449 Goéland monoplanes, one de Havilland DH.89 Dragon Rapide and six mid-range Lockheed Model 10A Electra aircraft. Relying on its renewed fleet, the company greatly expanded its list of destinations in 1937 and 1938. Regular flights to Sofia, Tirana, and Budapest were introduced, as well as a seasonal-tourist flight Dubrovnik - Zagreb - Vienna - Brno - Prague. In cooperation with Italian and Romanian companies, the Bucharest - Belgrade - Zagreb - Venice - Milan - Turin route was introduced.

In 1940, Aeroput broke all records by carrying over 16,000 passengers and 232 tons of freight by flying 726,000 aircraft-kilometers.

The development of the company was interrupted by the start of the Second World War. Aeroput suspended all services after the April War at beginning of the World War II in Yugoslavia in April 1941. After occupation of Yugoslavia in April 1941, the airline effectively ceased to exist, and its aircraft were seized by the Axis powers. After the war, the airline was rebranded and reestablished in 1947 as JAT Yugoslav Airlines. JAT was established with the assistant of the Yugoslav transport regiment and former Aeroput pilots and aircraft mechanics.

=== Establishment of Aeroput Technical service ===
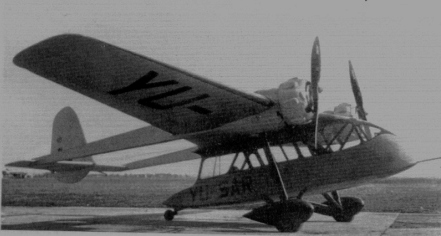
Aeroput MMS-3

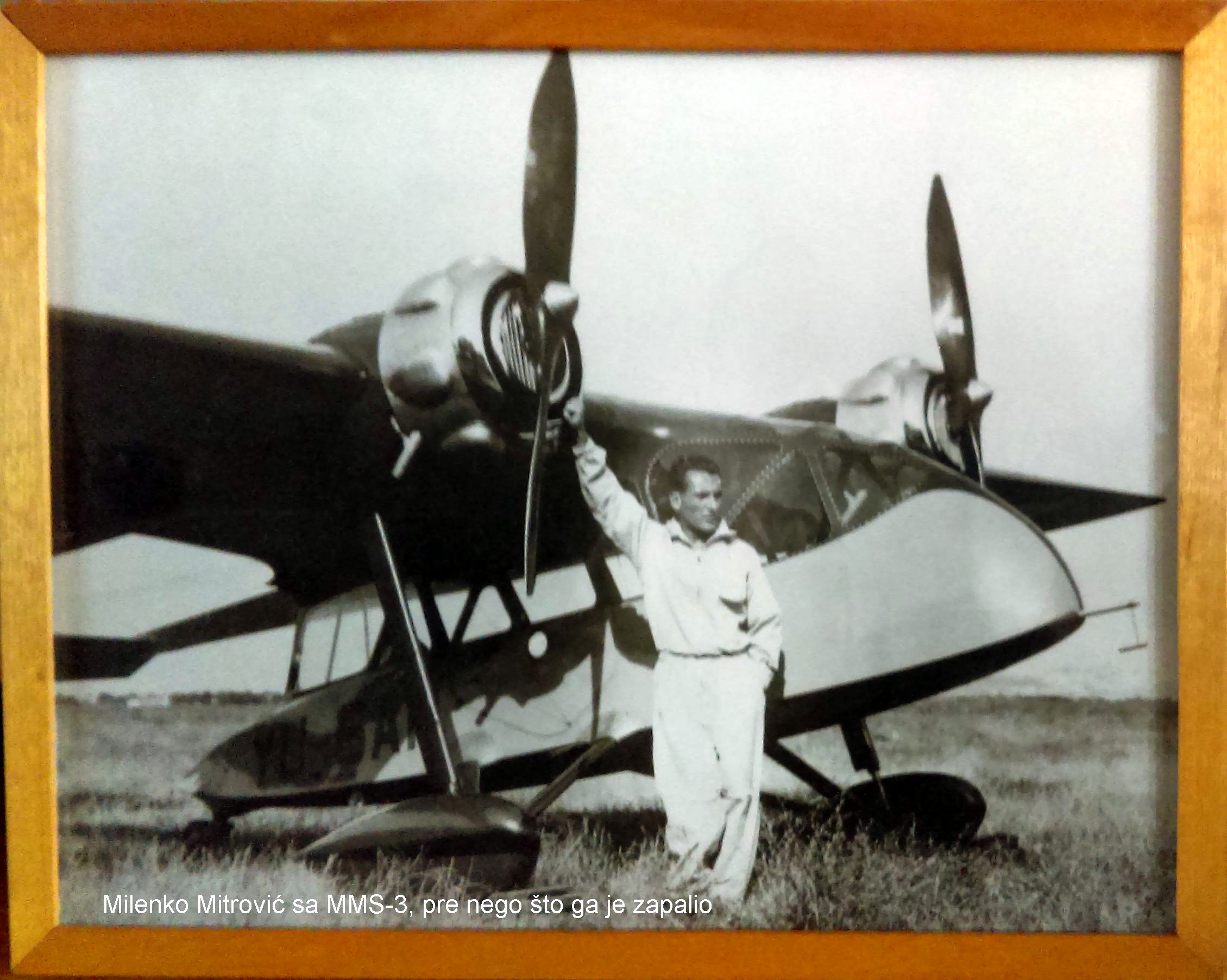
Milenko Mitrović Spirta with MMS-3, before he set it on fire, to prevent Germans to take it (April 1941).

In the first three years, while the fleet consisted only of Potez 29/2 biplanes, major aircraft maintenance for Aeroput was performed by aircraft factory Ikarus in Zemun, which had licence for producing a similar plane Potez 25 for the Royal Yugoslav Air Force (JKRV). Engine maintenance was performed at the factory Jasenica AD from Smederevska Palanka, which also produced under licence aircraft engines of the Lorraine brand. Early in 1931, Aeroput acquired a workshop for the repair of the aircraft from the French - Romanian company CIDNA, which was located at Zemun airport and assembly organized with the mechanics of Ikarus and the Air Force, and in that way organized its own technical aircraft maintenance service. Maintenance department was located in one of the large hangar at the civilian part of the airport, it was a modern and possessed a test stand for aero-engines. Since then, all the revisions, and airplane engines overhauling that had Aeroput were performed in they own technical service. How it was the good service, show fact that they are made in the service aircraft of domestic design, the Aeroput MMS-3.

=== World War II and postwar nationalization ===
Bombing in 1941 destroyed almost the entire property of the company. Due to the outbreak of war, 500 tons of fuel which were ordered and paid, never arrived. Aeroput sued for punitive damages on 31 October 1941. In 1942 the commissar administration banned Aeroput operations. German occupation authorities nationalized the property of Aeroput in Knez Mihailova Street 32, where they moved their national airline Deutsche Luft Hansa (DHN).

After the war Aeroput renewed work on 2 July 1945, and a general meeting of shareholders elected the first post-war management of the company. The meeting was attended by delegates of the new government of Democratic Federative Yugoslavia (DFY), and with the participation of then the Head of State Ivan Ribar, who was a pre-war shareholder and board member. However, the later communist government of the Federal People's Republic of Yugoslavia adopted a decree prohibiting private joint-stock companies, and on 24 December 1948 Aeroput was liquidated. Its assets were nationalized and the airline continued as Jat Airways.

== Fleet ==
List of aircraft in the Yugoslav civil aviation register used by Aeroput
Aircraft	Number in use	Years in use
Potez 29	6	1928–1938
Farman F.306	1	1931–1933
Spartan Cruiser Mk. II	3	1933–1940
de Havilland Dragon Rapide	1	1936–1940
Caudron C.449	2	1937–1940
Lockheed Model 10 Electra	8 (one leased)	1937–1940
Caudron C.441	1 (leased)	1936

== Destinations ==
Aeroput operated in the domestic airports and airfields of Belgrade, Ljubljana, Zagreb, Sarajevo, Skopje, Borovo, Sušak, Dubrovnik (Gruda), Podgorica, Niš and Split; along with domestic seaplane stations at Belgrade, Dubrovnik, Split, Divulje, Sušak, Kumbor (Kotor) and Vodice (Šibenik).

Regular flights were made from Belgrade and Zagreb to domestic destinations but also to international ones, to Thessaloniki, Graz, Vienna, Athens, Sofia, Trieste, Venice, Rome, Prague, Brno, Budapest, Klagenfurt and Tirana.

In 1938, Aeroput was a partner along Italian company Ala Littoria and Romanian CIDNA in the Milan-Venice-Zagreb-Belgrade-Bucharest route.

Destinations by the year they were introduced:

1928:

- Belgrade – Zagreb

1929:

- Zagreb – Belgrade – Skopje

1930:

- Belgrade – Zagreb – Graz – Vienna
- Zagreb – Sušak
- Belgrade – Sarajevo – Podgorica
- Belgrade – Skopje – Thessaloniki

1931:

- Belgrade – Sarajevo – Split – Sušak – Zagreb
- Vienna – Belgrade – Thessaloniki

1933:

- Belgrade – Skopje – Thessaloniki – Athens
- Zagreb – Ljubljana
- Ljubljana – Sušak

1934:

- Ljubljana – Zagreb – Sušak
- Ljubljana – Klagenfurt

1935:

- Belgrade – Borovo – Zagreb – Graz – Vienna (Borovo was added to the Belgrade – Vienna route)
- Belgrade – Niš – Skopje (Niš was added to the Belgrade – Skopje route)
- Belgrade – Skopje – Bitola – Thessaloniki (Bitola was added once a week, on Sundays)
- Belgrade – Sarajevo

1936:

- Belgrade – Podujevo – Skopje
- Belgrade – Sarajevo – Dubrovnik
- Belgrade – Borovo – Zagreb – Sušak – Ljubljana

1937:

- Zagreb – Sarajevo – Dubrovnik

1938:

- Belgrade – Sofia
- Dubrovnik – Sarajevo – Zagreb – Vienna – Brno – Prague
- Belgrade – Dubrovnik – Tirana

1939:

- Budapest – Zagreb – Venice – Rome
- Belgrade – Budapest

== See also ==
- Jat Airways
