= Farman F.300 =

F.300 and F.310
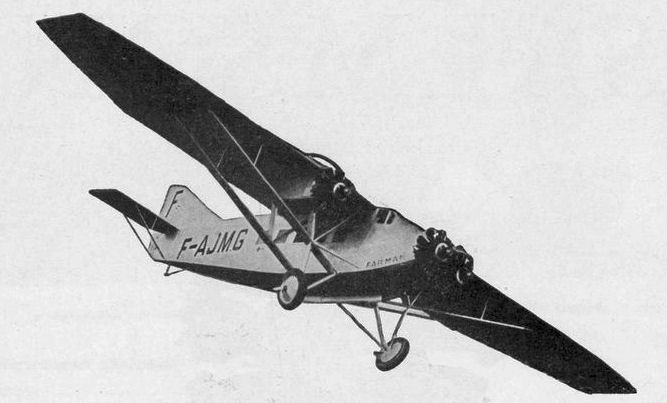
- F.300

General information
- Type: Airliner
- Manufacturer: Farman Aviation Works
- Number built: 22

History
- First flight: 13 January 1930

The Farman F.300 and F.310 were trimotor monoplane airliners designed and produced by the French aircraft manufacturer Farman Aviation Works.

They were high-wing strut-braced monoplanes with fixed tailskid undercarriage with a trimotor engine configuration that was popular amongst numerous aircraft manufacturers of the era. Both the cockpit and passenger compartment were fully enclosed. Most saw service in Farman's own airline, whose twelve F.300 variants made up half of its fleet in 1931.

== Design and development ==
The Farman F.300 was a trimotor semi-cantilever monoplane airliner. The aircraft was outfitted for night flying, featuring regulation position lights as standard; additional apparatus could include searchlights, signal lamps, flares, and rockets. A radio set was provided as standard, capable of both sending and receiving; electricity was supplied using either a windmill generator or a battery. The relatively low wing loading and balance of the aircraft were such that instances of motion sickness were claimed to be relatively low amongst the aircraft's passengers.

The aircraft featured mixed construction, being made of wood, duralumin, and fabric. The fuselage comprised a relatively rigid framework reinforced by interior ribs and double-covered by plywood. The aircraft was intentionally designed with relatively simplistic construction, which eased both inspection and repair tasks. This principal was extended to the tooling, efforts were made to avoid needing specialist or elaborate equipment to maintain or repair any part of the aircraft.

It was typically powered by an arrangement of three Salmson 9Ab radial engines; they provided plentiful reserve power and thus were typically operated at a reduced power set, which was relatively fuel-efficient, caused less wear, and also reduced risk of engine failure. These engines were arranged with one being in the nose aircraft while the other two were housed in lateral nacelles that were bolted directly onto the underside of the wing in a relatively drag-efficient manner. Due to the positioning of the engines, as well as the fitting of silencers, relatively little vibration or noise was inflicted upon the passengers.

To ease handling issues in the event of a single engine outage, the three propellers driven by these engines were placed relatively close together. The aircraft could fly indefinitely on only two engines. Various ignition systems could be used to start the engines, including Farman's own combination starters, cartridge-based systems, and other means. To address the threat posed by an engine fire, fire extinguishers were mounted on the engines while warning indicators were provided within the cockpit. Other fire-prevention measures included the presence of firewalls and the location of the fuel tanks being distant from both the engines and most other potential sources of ignition.

The high-mounted wings of the aircraft were directly attached to the upper portion of the fuselage. In the vicinity of the lateral engine nacelles, a pair of oblique streamlined duralurnin struts that attached to the lower portion of the fuselage were present for additional support; rigidity was secured via auxiliary struts and the undercarriage struts. This widely-spaced undercarriage, which was hinged to both the fuselage and the wing struts, featured an axleless design and was equipped with Meissier-built oleo-pneumatic shock absorbers and brakes. The undercarriage has been credited for the aircraft's relatively high stability during take-off runs, even from inhospitable terrain, while the brakes permitted the landing distance required to be significantly shortened as well. Careful use of the brakes prior to starting the take-off run could also shorten the distance required.

The cockpit provided room for two pilots; both positions were provisioned with full flight controls, permitting the aircraft to be operated alternately by either pilot. Via a series of windows along the sides and top of the cockpit, the pilots were provided with favourable external visibility across most directions; the side windows could also be opened and closed to the pilot's preference. The windows were intentionally inclined to deter adherence by rain and thus visibility becoming obscured. Various instrumentation was provided, including an air speed indicator, compass, altimeter, fuel gauge, and oil thermometers.

The passenger cabin was separated from the cockpit by a partition, albeit with an inset door permitting passage between the two areas. This cabin typically contains eight comfortable chairs, which were upholstered with artificial leather and fitted with adjustable backs, compact movable tables, arm rests, and straps. The walls of the cabin were punctuated by eight relatively large glass windows that provided both external visibility (when the adjustable sunshade was raised) and ventilation at the direction of each passenger. The temperature of the cabin could be maintained and adjusted across a wide range via an air-based heating system, while lighting was provided by several electric ceiling lamps. Baggage nets were provided for the passengers to keep necessary items within reach, although the majority of the baggage was expected to be stowed in a dedicated baggage room, which was fitted with a large door suitable for the loading and unloading for freight. Additionally, there was a lavatory, complete with running water, at the rear of the passenger cabin.

== Operational history ==
One variant, the F.302, was specially built as a single-engine machine to make an attempt at a number of world records. On 9 March 1931, Jean Réginensi and Marcel Lalouette set new distance and duration records over a closed circuit with a 2,000 kg payload, flying 2,678 km (1,664 mi) in 17 hours. Another, the F.304 was built as a special trimotor for Marcel Goulette to make a long-distance flight the same month from Paris to Tananarive and back.

The F.310 prototype of a floatplane version of the same basic design, was destroyed while landing during trials, and no further examples were built.

== Variants ==
F.300
prototype with Gnome et Rhône 5Ba engines (one built)
F.301
production version with Salmson 9Ab engines (six built)
F.302
version powered with single Hispano-Suiza 12Nb for record attempt, (one built, later re-engined with Hispano-Suiza 12Lbr
F.303
production version with Gnome et Rhône 5Ba engines (six built)
F.304
long-range version with Lorraine 9N engines (one built)
F.305
production version with Gnome et Rhône 9A engines (two built)
F.306
production version with Lorraine 7Me engines (four built)
F.310
floatplane version with Salmson 9Ab engines (one built)

== Operators ==
France

- Air Orient operated four aircraft.
- Farman Line operated 12 aircraft.

Yugoslavia

- Aeroput operated 1 F.306 aircraft.

== Specifications (F.301) ==
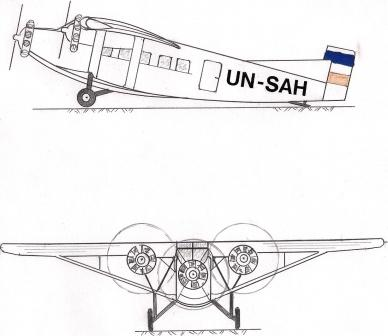
Farman F.306 2-view drawing

Data from Farman F.301: Aviafrance The Farman "F.300" commercial airplane (French)

General characteristics

- Crew: One (pilot)
- Capacity: Eight passengers
- Length: 13.35 m (43 ft 10 in)
- Wingspan: 19.12 m (62 ft 9 in)
- Height: 3.3 m (10 ft 10 in)
- Wing area: 71 m^{2} (760 sq ft)
- Empty weight: 2,610 kg (5,754 lb)
- Gross weight: 4,530 kg (9,987 lb)
- Powerplant: 3 × Salmson 9Ab nine-cylinder air-cooled radial piston engine, 170 kW (230 hp) each

Performance

- Maximum speed: 230 km/h (140 mph, 120 kn)
- Cruise speed: 190 km/h (120 mph, 100 kn)
