= List of Croatian military equipment of World War II =

The Independent State of Croatia was established by Germany and Italy on 10 April 1941 after Yugoslavia had fallen to Axis forces. The Croatian State survived until January 1945, then the Soviet offense pushed Axis-supporting Croatians back into Austria. The list below covers military equipment of Croatian Axis supporters (Croatian Home Guard, Ustaše militia and Croatian Armed Forces) in the years 1941–1945. It does not include the equipment of the pro-Allies partisans. Also, the equipment of German-controlled units comprising a large fraction of ethic Croatians (373rd, 392nd and 369th infantry divisions) is excluded from this list.

== Knives and bayonets ==
- Kampfmesser 42
- Seitengewehr 98

== Small arms ==
=== Pistols (manual and semi-automatic) ===
- FN Model 1922
- FN Model 1900
- Luger P08
- Walther P38
- Mauser C96
- Tokarev TT-33
- Ruby M1915
- Nagant M1895
- Gasser M1874
- Chamelot-Delvigne MAS 1874

=== Automatic pistols and submachine guns ===
- Thompson submachine gun
- STEN
- Erma EMP
- Beretta Model 38
- MP 34
- MP 38
- MP 40
- MP 41
- Suomi KP/-31
- PPSh-41

=== Rifles ===
- Karabiner 98k - main rifle
- Mauser Gewehr 98
- Mauser M1895
- Kbk wz. 1929
- vz. 24
- Berthier M1915
- Steyr-Mannlicher M1895
- Caracano M1891/41
- FN Model 24
- Mosin-Nagant M1891/30
- Lebel Model 1886

=== Grenades and grenade launchers ===
- Model 24 grenade
- Model 24 smoke grenade

== Machine guns ==
=== Infantry and dual-purpose machine guns ===
- Fiat-Revelli Modello 1914
- ZB vz. 26
- ZB vz. 30
- Schwarlose M07/24
- Maschinengewehr 34
- Maschinengewehr 42
- Chauchat FM 1915
- Lewis
- PM 1910
- Maxim M1909
- DWM MG 08
- Madsen
- Hotchkiss M1914
- DShK 1938
- Darne M1918

== Artillery ==
=== Infantry mortars ===
- Stokes mortar (60 mm)
- Brandt Mle 27/31 (81 mm)
- 8 cm Granatwerfer 34
- Granatwerfer 42

=== Field artillery ===
- 7.5cm horsky kanon vz. 15
- Skoda houfnice vz 14
- Canon de 105 mle 1913 Schneider (105mm M.13)
- 10.4 cm Feldkanone M. 15 (M.15/25)
- 10.5 cm Feldhaubitze 98/09 (105mm M.98/9)
- Canon Court de 105 M(montagne) modèle 1919 Schneider
- 10.5 cm leFH 16 (105mm M.16)
- 10.5 cm hruby kanon vz. 35 (local designation 105 mm M.36)
- Schneider-Canet 120mm M.15

=== Fortress and siege guns ===
- 12-cm Kanone M 80 (local designation 120 mm M.80 )
- Skoda Model 1928 Gun (local designation 150mm M.28)
- De Bange 155 mm cannon (local designation 155 mm M.77)

=== Anti-tank guns ===
- PaK 36 (37mm)
- 3.7 cm kanon PÚV vz. 34
- 47 mm kanon P.U.V. vz. 36

== Anti-tank weapons (besides anti-tank guns) ==
- Panzerfaust
- Panzerschreck

== Anti-aircraft weapons ==
=== Light anti-aircraft guns ===
- 2 cm Flak 30/38/Flakvierling

=== Heavy anti-aircraft guns ===
- 8.8 cm Flak 18/36/37/41
- 8.35 cm PL kanon vz. 22
- 9 cm kanon PL vz. 12/20

== Vehicles ==
=== Tankettes ===
- TKS - 18 received 10 October 1941
- L3/33 - 10 received from Hungary in autumn 1942. 30 received from Germany after being captured from Italians in the aftermath of the Armistice of Cassibile 8 September 1943
- L3/35 - imported from Italy

=== Tanks ===
- Renault FT or Renault R35- 16 ex-Yugoslavian vehicles not used in combat, but either scrapped or integrated in armored train
- Hotchkiss H39 - received from Germany in spring 1944
- L6/40 - 24 received from Germany after being captured from Italians in the aftermath of the Armistice of Cassibile 8 September 1943
- M14/41 - 15 received from Germany after being captured from Italians in the aftermath of the Armistice of Cassibile 8 September 1943
- Panzer I - 21 received in the first half of July 1942
- Panzer III N - 20 to 25 vehicles received in late 1944
- Panzer IV, models F, G and H - 15 received in late 1944

=== Self-propelled guns ===
==== Tank-based ====
- Semovente da 47/32 - 10 received from Germany in May 1944
- StuG III Ausf. G - 8 received from Germany in August 1944

==== Other ====
- improvised armored Train, using turrets of either Renault FT or Hotchkiss H39

=== Armored cars ===
- Autoblindo 41 - 10 received from Germany after being captured from Italians in the aftermath of the Armistice of Cassibile 8 September 1943
- Sd. Kfz. 221 - 12 received from Germany

=== Armored carriers ===
- Sd.Kfz. 251 - 12 to 15 vehicles received in middle 1944

=== Trucks ===
- Opel Blitz A

=== Passenger cars ===
- Volkswagen Kübelwagen
- Volkswagen Schwimmwagen

=== Motorcycles ===
- BMW R75

=== Tractors and prime movers ===
- C2P artillery tractor (unarmoured design based on TKS)

== Navy ships and war vessels ==
Croatian Navy was restricted until September, 1943 to do not have any vessel over 50 tons displacement. Therefore, the Navy was limited to coastal patrol crafts.

== Aircraft ==
=== Initial batch (1941) ===
- Ikarus IK-2 - 4
- Hawker Hurricane - 6
- Dornier Do 17K - 6 until May, 1941
- Bristol Blenheim I - 8
- Potez 25 - 45
- Breguet 19 - 50
- Fizir F1V - 5
- Zmaj Fizir FP-2
- Fokker F.IX model F.39 - 1
- Savoia-Marchetti SM.79 -1
- Avia BH-33 E - 7
- Hawker Fury II - 1

=== Reinforcements (1942) ===
- Caproni Ca.311 M - 10
- AVIA FL.3 - 20
- Fiat G.50bis Freccia - 9
- Fiat G.50B (trainer) - 1
- Dornier Do 17K - 11 + (9 on Russian front)
- Bristol Blenheim I - 3
- Caproni Ca.310 - 1
- Rogožarski PVT - 15
- Rogožarski R-100 (ground attack version) - 11
- Potez 25 ~ 4
- Breguet 19 ~ 4
- Zmaj Fizir FN ~ 4 or 23
- Zmaj Fizir FP-2 ~ 4
- Fokker F.7 - 7
- Fokker F.9 - 1
- Fokker F.XVIII - 1

=== Frontline reinforcements (1943) ===
- Dornier Do 17E - 30
- Bücker Bü 131 - 34
- Saiman 200 - 25
- Morane-Saulnier M.S.406 - 48
- Beneš-Mráz Beta-Minor - 25
- Fiat CR.42 - 6 (captured from Italy)
- CANT Z.1007 ~ 4 (captured from Italy)
- Fiat BR.20 Cicogna ~ 4 (captured from Italy)
- Fiat G.50 Freccia ~ 43 (captured from Italy)

=== Last reinforcements (1944-1945) ===
- Macchi C.202 - 18
- Macchi C.200 ~ 4
- Macchi C.205 - 4
- Messerschmitt 109G - 46
- Bücker Bü 181 - 22
- Ju 87D - 15
- Ju 87R-2 - 6
- Fieseler Fi 167 ~ 11
- Dornier Do 17E - 12
- Messerschmitt 110G - 2

== Cartridges and shells ==
- Panzergranate 39 (Pzgr. 39)
- sprenggranate (Sprgr.)
- 9×19 mm Parabellum
- 7.92×33mm Kurz
- 7.92×57mm Mauser
