= Ikarus Orkan =

Orkan

General information
- Type: Light bomber/reconnaissance aircraft
- National origin: Kingdom of Yugoslavia
- Manufacturer: Ikarus
- Designer: S.Momčilović and D.Radojković
- Primary user: Royal Yugoslav Air Force
- Number built: 1 prototype

History
- First flight: June 24, 1940

The Ikarus Orkan (Serbian Cyrillic: Икарус Оркан) was a three-seat twin-engine monoplane designed as a light bomber/reconnaissance aircraft in the Kingdom of Yugoslavia before World War II. It was designed and built at the Ikarus factory in Zemun-Belgrade.

== Development ==
The Orkan was created as a private project by two young designers, S. Momcilovic and D. Radojkovic. They tried to make a light two-engine bomber. By the end of 1937, most of the prototype documentation was complete. A wooden model was tested in early 1938 in the wind tunnel in Paris. The aircraft was high winged with very clean aerodynamic fuselage and full metal construction. The wing had a NACA 23012 airfoil with a root thickness of 12% and a top sash thickness of 6%. The Yugoslav Air Force command was interested in the aircraft for the new Yugoslav twin-engine medium bomber competition.

The prototype had to be shipped by June 14, 1939. Ikarus is committed to providing engines for aircraft and weapons. It was initially planned to use a 552 kW Hispano-Suiza 14AB because of its compactness. It was intended to be well-armed with a forward-firing 20 mm Hispano Suiza HS.404 cannon and a rear-firing 20 mm Oerlikon FF for defence. It was also envisaged that the aircraft would have three 7.92 mm machine guns (two on the front and one on the back). From Orkana, the expected performance was 500 km/h, a rate of climb 4,000 m (13,000 ft) in 4.5 minutes, a radius of action of 1,000 to 1,200 km, and an 800 kg payload of bombs.

Electric equipment was the most recently available from the domestic manufacturers Mikron and Teleoptik. Teleoptik provided landing gear and flap control equipment, which reported the position of the flaps and landing gear. More of them, Orkan had the internal crew communicator system, Teleoptik M-38 oxygen system, and gun camera installation. Teleoptik also constructed the powered rear cannon mounting with electric firing.

French manufacturer Messier produced the complete hydraulics equipment and landing gear according to Yugoslavian specifications. The system powered the landing gear, cooling gills, bomb bay door, gunner sliding hood, tail wheel, and flaps. The landing gear retracted into the nacelles behind the engines. The wheels were fitted with low-pressure tires, which allowed it to operate off grass airstrips.

While the prototype was being manufactured, the Second World War broke out, which caused additional problems. France banned the export of war materiels, so, in consultation with the YRAF command, the Hispano Suiza 14AB engine was replaced by a 627 kW Fiat A.74 RC 38. This necessitated a change in the aircraft's design and estimate of the other parameters, which led to a change in the completion of the prototype.

== Operational history ==
The prototype was completed in April 1940, and the first flight was planned for the same month. However, the maiden flight was made at Zemun airport on 24 June 1940 due to the additional trimming. When landing, it was damaged, and due to the war in Europe, its repair took longer, and it could not restart testing until March 1941. Flights began on 19 March 1941, and 13 flights were made by 5 April. The aircraft showed good results in meeting the expectations of the set project task. Serial production did not start because of the Invasion of Yugoslavia by Germany and Italy on 6 April.

The Orkan was damaged and captured in September 1941 during the brief war. It was embarked on a train and transported to Nazi Germany for testing. The fate of the plane is unknown.

== Operators ==
Kingdom of Yugoslavia

- Yugoslav Royal Air Force

== Specifications ==
Data from

General characteristics

- Crew: 3
- Length: 10 m (32 ft 10 in)
- Wingspan: 13.25 m (43 ft 6 in)
- Height: 3.2 m (10 ft 6 in)
- Wing area: 26 m^{2} (280 sq ft)
- Empty weight: 2,870 kg (6,327 lb)
- Powerplant: 2 × Fiat A.74 R.C.38 14-cylinderair-cooled radial piston engines, 618 kW (829 hp) each
- Propellers: 3-bladed variable-pitch propellers

Performance

- Maximum speed: 545 km/h (339 mph, 294 kn)
- Cruise speed: 468 km/h (291 mph, 253 kn)
- Range: 1,200 km (750 mi, 650 nmi)
- Service ceiling: 11,000 m (36,000 ft)
- Rate of climb: 15 m/s (3,000 ft/min)

Armament

- Guns:

- 3 × 20 mm (0.787 in) cannon
- 3 x 7.92 mm (0.312 in) machine gun

- Bombs:

- 4 x 106 kg (234 lb)

== See also ==
- Rogožarski R-313
- Zmaj R-1
