= Dušan Stankov =

- Born: 30 April 1900; Vršac, Austro-Hungarian Monarchy
- Died: 4 March 1983 (aged 82); Novi Sad, SFR Yugoslavia
- Education: University of Belgrade
- Alma mater: Faculty of Mechanical Engineering
- Years active: 1927–1969
- Spouse(s): Mara Stankov, born Pavkov
- Parent(s): Stevan (Steja) Stankov, Jelena (Lenka) Stankov, born Popović

Dušan Stankov/(Serbian Cyrillic: Душан Станков) (30 April 1900, Vršac–4 March 1983, Novi Sad), was an engineer and professor at the University of Belgrade's Faculty of the Mechanical Engineering, a Yugoslav aircraft constructor, who contributed greatly to developing the studies at the faculty and the faculty itself as well as to the development of the Yugoslav Air Force in general.

== Life ==
Dušan Stankov was born on 30 April 1900 in Vršac (Banat, Vojvodina) where he finished elementary school and comprehensive high school. He graduated from the Faculty of Technology, Belgrade University in 1924, and died on 4 March 1983, as a retired professor of the Faculty of Mechanical Engineering, Belgrade University.

== Career ==
Following his graduation from university, and after serving conscript duty, engineer Stankov began working in Ikarus factory in Zemun in September 1927 as an engineer until 1931. In that period he spent several months working on the construction and production of aircraft in Ikarus and in the Novi Sad-based Ikarus factory. At the time, seaplanes of domestic constructors for the purposes of Yugoslav navy air force were manufactured at the Novi Sad-based Ikarus factory. The Ikarus factory engaged engineers Rudolf Fizir and Josef Mickl who had long and vast experience in building aircraft. These engineers were outstanding in building aircraft; however, they lacked training in calculating constructions, so they were assigned a young engineer, Dušan Stankov, who excelled in static mechanics, and who did all calculations in static mechanics of all the planes built by his senior colleagues. Based on these calculations these seaplanes were granted their sailing licenses.

From April 1931 to April 1933, engineer Dušan Stankov worked in the Air Force Command in Zemun. As of April 1933 he transferred from the Air Force Command into the Zemun-based company Zmaj as a CTO of this aircraft factory, staying on this post until the capitulation of the Kingdom of Yugoslavia in the April War 1941. These years are considered to be Stankov’s most prolific period in his career. Besides working on aircraft construction, whether he liked it or not, as a technical director he had to deal with the problems in aircraft production, which were not so trivial. Namely, the machine industry in Yugoslavia was poorly developed then, so the manufacturers were left to their own devices to solve these problems. On the other hand, this proved to be a very fertile soil for future development of experts of all profiles. The Yugoslav aviation industry between two world wars was a sort of a seminary of superb experts in all profiles and specializations. Furthermore, during the war, Dusan Stankov was a reader at the Department of Mechanical Engineering, Faculty of Technology in Belgrade for the subject Static Mechanics of Aircraft.

In the post war period, professor Dušan Stankov continued working on construction of aircraft, so as early as 1946 he participated in a competition opened by the Air Force Command. Based on the pre-war bomber Zmaj R-1 he designed a twin-engine training bomber Ikarus 215 which did not go into serial production; however, the prototype made in Ikarus factory, was used for years for the training of bomber pilots at the Faculty of Mechanical Engineering in Belgrade at the Aviation Department, when upon fulfilling legal conditions for a full-tenured professor, he retired.

== Aircraft projects ==
- Fizir Mybach- static calculation, 1927
- IOC and IOB-worked on both seaplanes, 1929
- IO-conducted complete static testing by himself, 1930
- Dewoitine D.1 –reconstruction of a fighter fuselage 1930-31
- Fizir F1V – basic training aircraft, 1930 (serial production),
- Fizir F1M-Jupiter – school seaplane, 1930 (serial production),
- Zmaj Fizir FN - basic training aircraft, 1930 (serial production),
- Heinkel He-8 – seaplane (1 plane 1931. god.) construction and making the metal framework of the fuselage
- Fizir FP-1 – training aircraft (1 plane – prototype 1934)
- Zmaj Fizir FP-2 – training aircraft 1936 (serial production),
- Zmaj R-1 – multi-purpose fighter-bomber (destroyer) (1 plane – prototype 1940)
- Ikarus 215 – multi-purpose plane 1949

== Gallery ==
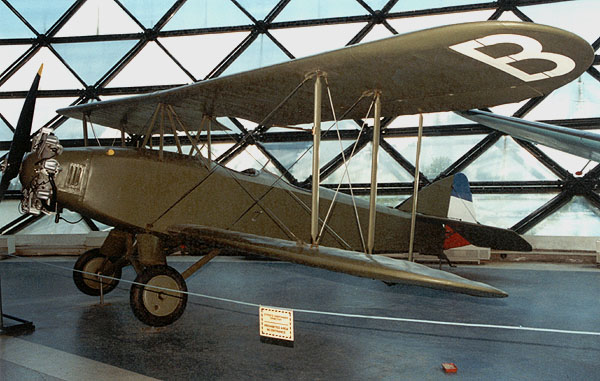
Zmaj Fizir FN Yugoslav aircraft trainer (1930).

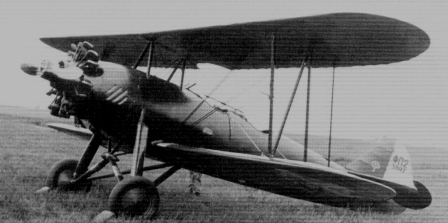
Zmaj Fizir FP-2 a Yugoslav Advanced Training (1936).

== Teaching career ==
As early as 1934, engineer Dušan Stankov began teaching at the Faculty of Technology, Belgrade University, as associate reader. As of 1946 he was elected honorary lecturer at the Faculty of Mechanical Engineering, where together with his colleagues he laid solid foundations for modern studies, thus enabling Yugoslav air force of those times which was in great need of educated staff, to get young, educated professionals. In October 1948, he was elected associate professor at the Aviation Department of the Faculty of Mechanical Engineering, and in 1949 was appointed dean of the Faculty of Mechanical Engineering. As the Dean of the Faculty he gave immense contribution to improving studies and providing all necessary conditions for establishing and equipping much needed labs in the faculty, and started the project of building the new premises of the faculty. In 1971, he was awarded the title of doctor honoris causa of the University of Belgrade.

== Books ==
During his teaching career at the Faculty of Mechanical Engineering, professor Dušan Stankov, in addition to writing numerous scientific papers, also authored textbooks: "Lectures from aircraft statics" and “Calculation of aircraft constructions”.

- Stankov, Dušan (1948), Predavanja iz statike aviona. Belgrade, publisher: Naučna knjiga.
- Stankov, Dušan (1971), Proračun avionskih konstrukcija ("Calculation of aircraft constructions"), Belgrade, publisher: Naučna knjiga.

== See also ==
- Fizir Mybach
- Fizir F1V
- Fizir F1M-Jupiter
- Zmaj Fizir FN
- Zmaj Fizir FP-2
- Zmaj R-1
- Ikarus 215
