= Zmaj Fizir FP-2 =

Yugoslav single-engine, two-seater biplane

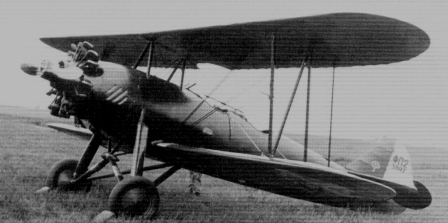

General information
- Type: Advanced trainer
- National origin: Yugoslavia
- Manufacturer: Zmaj Zemun
- Designer: R.Fizir and D.Stankov
- Status: inactive
- Primary user: Yugoslav Royal Air Force
- Number built: 81

History
- Introduction date: 1936
- First flight: 1933
- Retired: 1947

Aircraft Zmaj Fizir FP-2 (Serbian Cyrillic:Змај Физир ФП-2) was a Yugoslav single-engine, two-seater biplane. It was designed by R. Fizir and D. Stankov built at the Factory Zmaj in Zemun in 1936.

== Design and development ==
In 1933, the command of the Yugoslav Royal Air Force (YRAF)decided to replace outdated planes with modern school aircraft, for transitional training from basic training to combat. Zmaj Factory designed a prototype biplane, Fizir FP-1, in 1993 for transitional pilot training, but it did not satisfy all the requirements set by the YRAF. As a result, aircraft designers and engineers, Rudolf Fizir and Dušan Stankov, made adjustments to the Fizir FP-1 and so the plane became the, Zmaj Fizir FP-2.

The designers opted for the concept aircraft biplane, although the YRAF preferred an aircraft with one low wing (due to the development of modern combat aircraft). In the end, the concept of a new transitional school aircraft was accepted. Prototype Zmaj Fizir FP-2 (Fizir Prelazni) with a 300 kW (400 hp) Gnome-Rhône 7K engine was completed and test flown at the end of 1933. More test flights followed, and by 1934 the plane showed good results. Zmaj modified the FP-2 during 1934 using a 235 kW (315 hp) Walter Pollux II engine, but the results were not satisfactory.

The Zmaj Fizir FP-2 was a two-seater single-engine biplane aircraft, with air-cooled, 7 cylinder radial engine (Gnome-Rhone K-7 308 kW), and a pair of struts on each side. It had flaps on the upper and lower wings. Landing gear is fixed to a shaft, and deployment uses a rubber rope. Fuselage and wings were wood covered with canvas. The plane represented a classical "Yugoslav manufacturers 'school'" - a two-seater, two wings, solid wood construction and polished aerodynamic shape, easy to fly, stable and reliable aircraft that is largely insensitive to pilot errors.

On 22 May 1936, the Zmaj factory offered the Navy a seaplane Zmaj Fizir FP-2H with a Gnome-Rhone K-9 engine, but the project was not accepted.

== Operational history ==
A total of 66 aircraft of this type were produced and served in the Yugoslav Royal Air Force from 1936 to 1941. They were used for training military pilots. The first series of 20 of these aircraft were delivered to the YRAF in early 1936 and were immediately introduced into the first and second Pilot School. From 1938 to 1940 45 more aircraft were delivered. All three series aircraft were equipped the same, except the third series of five aircraft that were equipped to fly blind. These planes had a new pilot's panel and Zemun Teleoptik (similar to the Rogožarski PVT). The fifth series Zmaj Fizir FP-2 (15 copies ordered in 1940) was not completed by the start of the April war. At the beginning of 1943 the Germans allowed factory to complete the fifth series aircraft Zmaj Fizir FP-2 for the Croatian Air Force, but by 22 October 1944 (Liberation Day Zemun) only 8 aircraft were delivered. The last 7 aircraft were completed and handed over after the People's Liberation Army Air Force for use by the Yugoslav Army. Thus the total number of Zmaj Fizir FP-2 aircraft produced was 81.

The Italians seized 13 Zmaj Fizir FP-2 aircraft and with the Rogožarski PVT aircraft they were used from May 1941 to June 1943 against the rebels in Montenegro and Albania. The Germans seized 7 Zmaj Fizir FP-2 at the Butmir airport and handed them over to their allies, the Croats (NDH), which used them throughout the war, starting in 1941. All planes of this type that survived the war were included in the Yugoslav Army Air Force (RV JA) and flew there until 1947. The postwar registry included were 12 Zmaj Fizir FP-2 planes. The remains of one of these planes are kept at the Museum of Yugoslav Aviation.

== Operators ==
Kingdom of Yugoslavia

- Yugoslav Royal Air Force 65 aircraft

Yugoslavia

- SFR Yugoslav Air Force - Postwar.

Croatia

- Air Force of the Independent State of Croatia 23 ex-Yugoslav Royal Air Force

Italy

- Regia Aeronautica 13 aircraft ex-Yugoslav Royal Air Force

== Specifications ==
General characteristics

- Crew: 2
- Length: 7.90 m (25 ft 11 in)
- Wingspan: 10.80 m (35 ft 5 in)
- Height: 2.90 m (9 ft 6 in)
- Wing area: 28.80 m^{2} (310.0 sq ft)
- Empty weight: 740 kg (1,631 lb)
- Gross weight: 1,450 kg (3,197 lb)
- Powerplant: 1 × Gnome-Rhône 7K 7-cylinder radial, 313 kW (420 hp)
- Propellers: 2-bladed

Performance

- Maximum speed: 238 km/h (148 mph, 129 kn) at sea level
- Cruise speed: 200 km/h (120 mph, 110 kn)
- Range: 580 km (360 mi, 310 nmi)
- Service ceiling: 6,800 m (22,300 ft)

== See also ==
- Yugoslav Royal Air Force
- Zmaj Fizir FN
- Fizir F1V
- Rogožarski PVT
- Rogožarski R-100
- Rudolf Fizir
- Dušan Stankov
