= Zmaj Aircraft =

Yugoslav aircraft manufacturer

Zmaj
- Company type: Joint stock company
- Industry: Aerospace
- Founded: 15 March 1927
- Founders: Jovan Petrović; Dragoljub Šterić
- Defunct: 1946
- Fate: Nationalised and merged with Ikarus in 1946
- Successor: Ikarus
- Headquarters: Zemun, Serbia
- Key people: Dušan Stankov

Zmaj (Serbian Cyrillic: Змај), officially named Fabrika aeroplana i hidroaviona Zmaj (English: Airplane and Hydroplane Factory Zmaj), was a Yugoslav aircraft manufacturer.

== History ==
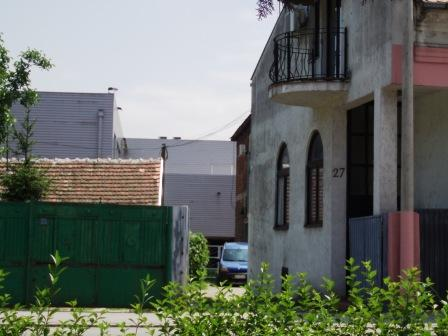
27 Tošin Bunar Street, the site where Zmaj was founded in 1927

The company was founded in 1927 and it was the third aeronautical factory in Serbia. At the beginning it manufactured aircraft under French license, and in 1932 it started with local planes designed by Jovan Petrović and Dragoljub Šterić. Several types of aircraft were manufactured by Zmaj, among them passenger Spartans for the domestic airliner Aeroput. Zmaj workshops manufactured 359 aircraft up until 1946, when the factory stopped manufacturing for aviation industry purposes and the company was nationalised and merged with Rogožarski into Ikarus.

== Aircraft ==
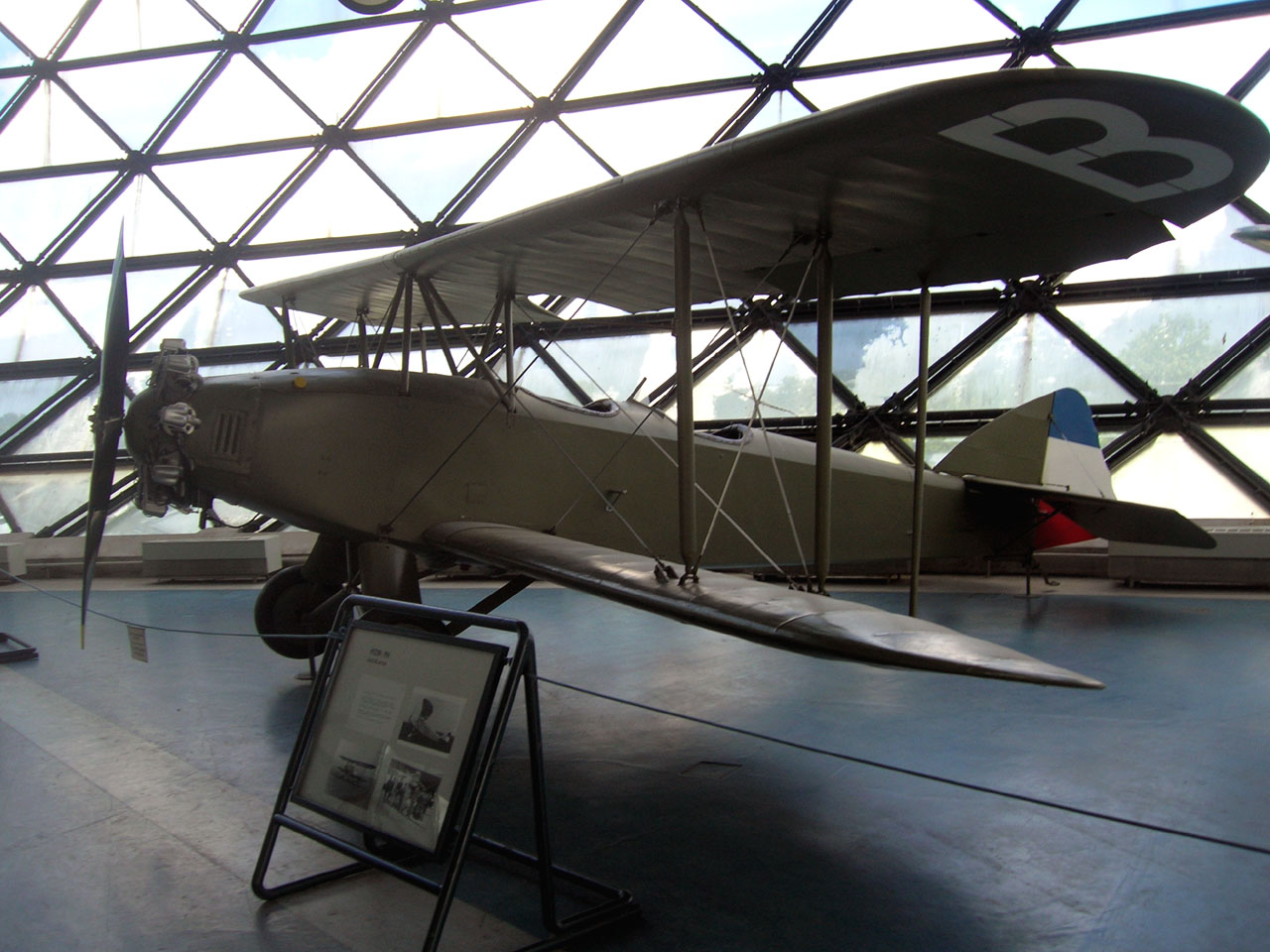
Fizir FN on display in the Museum of Aviation

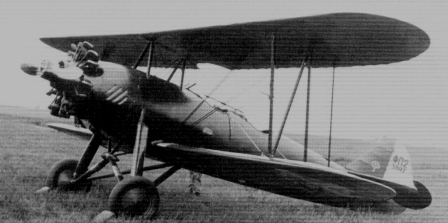
Fizir FP-2

Model name	First flight	Number built	Type
Zmaj Fizir F1	1925	36 (Note: An additional 20 aircraft were built by Rogožarski.)	Single engine biplane trainer
Zmaj Fizir FN	1929	137 (Note: An additional 60 aircraft were built by Rogožarski and Albatross.)	Single engine biplane trainer
Zmaj Fizir FP	1933	81	Single engine biplane trainer
Zmaj R-1	1940	1	Single engine monoplane bomber
Zmaj HD.320		45	License built single engine biplane trainer
Zmaj H.41		10	License built single engine biplane floatplane trainer
Zmaj D.27		3	License built single engine monoplane fighter
Zmaj GL.2		26	License built single engine monoplane fighter
Zmaj HE 8		1	License built single engine monoplane floatplane reconnaissance airplane
Zmaj Cruiser II		1	License built three engine monoplane airliner
Zmaj Fury		16 (Note: An additional 24 aircraft were built by Ikarus.)	License built single engine biplane fighter
Zmaj Hurricane		24	License built single engine monoplane fighter

== See also ==
- Aircraft industry of Serbia
