= Ikarus 215 =

Yugoslav light bomber and a training aircraft

General information
- Type: Trainer (aircraft)/Bomber aircraft
- National origin: Yugoslavia
- Manufacturer: Fabrika aero i hidroplana Ikarus A.D. Zemun - Belgrade
- Designer: Eng. Dušan Stankov
- Status: inactive
- Primary user: SFR Yugoslav Air Force
- Number built: 1

History
- Introduction date: prototype
- First flight: 1949
- Retired: 1957

The Ikarus 215 (Икарус 215 in Serbian) twin-engine plane, was a Yugoslav light bomber and a training aircraft of mixed construction, the prototype flew in 1949. It did not go into production. The prototype was used for training and as a liaison. It was designed and built at the Ikarus factory in Zemun-Belgrade.

== Design and development ==
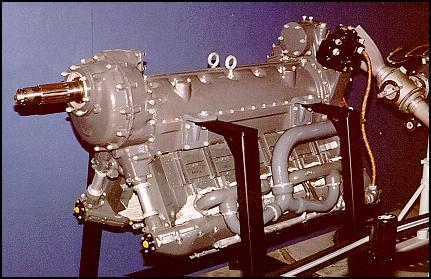
Ranger V-770 engine installed in Ikarus 215

Ikarus 215 was designed by engineer constructor Dušan Stankov, and was originally designed before the World War II as a Zmaj R-1 multi-purpose fighter - bomber - but the scout redesigned given the available engines and purpose. The prototype first flew in 1949. It was a twin engined low-wing aircraft of mixed construction, with a crew of two to four (depending on the role). The undercarriage retracted into the engine nacelles backward, while the tail wheel was fixed. The prototype was driven by two twelve-cylinder, air-cooled, in-line piston engines Ranger SVG-770 C-B1. Aircraft wing had a wooden structure lined with plywood, was the trapezoid-shaped wings and the ends were rounded. The construction of the fuselage was made from an oval-shaped duralumin covered cardboard timber.

== Operational history ==
Aircraft Ikarus 215 series are not produced. During testing it was determined that the aircraft will not be able to respond to the primary purpose (light twin-engine bomber), it has also contributed to the unexpectedly rapid development of aviation, fighter-bomber takes on the role of light bomber. Ikarus 215 prototype aircraft is mainly used as a training school for the training of bomber pilots as the plane for the connection. Withdrawn from use in 1957.

== Operators ==
Yugoslavia

- Yugoslav Air Force 1 aircraft

== Specifications ==
Data from :Janić, Čedomir. "Rogožarski AŽR" (in (Serbian)). Aeromagazin 17 (-{YU}--Београд: BB Soft), p 34. ISSN 1450-6068.

General characteristics

- Crew: 2-4
- Length: 13.35 m (43 ft 10 in)
- Wingspan: 16.14 m (52 ft 11 in)
- Height: 4.03 m (13 ft 3 in)
- Wing area: 29.80 m^{2} (320.8 sq ft)
- Empty weight: 3,424 kg (7,549 lb)
- Gross weight: 4,685 kg (10,329 lb)
- Powerplant: 2 × Ranger, SGV-770C-1(12-cylinder inverted Vee piston engine), 387.7 kW (519.9 hp) each
- Propellers: 2-bladed

Performance

- Maximum speed: 374 km/h (232 mph, 202 kn) at altitude of 3500 m and mass of 4297 kg
- Range: 1,120 km (700 mi, 600 nmi)
- Service ceiling: 8,150 m (26,740 ft)

Armament

- Guns: 3 × MG-15 with 225 rounds per gun
- Bombs: 4 × 50 kg

== See also ==
- SFR Yugoslav Air Force
- Ranger V-770
- Zmaj R-1
- Dušan Stankov
