= Zmaj R-1 =

1940s Yugoslav bomber aircraft prototype

- Zmaj R-1

General information
- Type: Bomber aircraft
- National origin: Yugoslavia
- Manufacturer: Zmaj, Zemun
- Designer: D.Stankov and Dj.Ducić
- Status: retired
- Primary user: Yugoslav Royal Air Force
- Number built: 1

History
- Introduction date: prototype
- First flight: 24 April 1940
- Retired: 1941

The Zmaj R-1 (Serbian Cyrillic: Змај Р-1) was a twin-engined prototype bomber produced by Zmaj aircraft of the former Yugoslavia, designed in the 1930s. The aircraft remained a prototype due to a number of difficulties in testing.

== Design and development ==
During 1936 at the Zmaj factory, Dušan Stankov, then technical manager, initiated the design and construction of a reconnaissance-bomber. After tests in the wind tunnel at Warsaw and acceptance by the Yugoslavian Air Force, the project was designated Zmaj R-1. The team of designers joining Eng. Djordje Ducić and a few young engineers who worked on the design completed the prototype before the beginning of a large aerospace workers strike in April 1940, with final assembly at the military part of the airport in Zemun.

The first flight was on 24 April 1940, piloted by reserve Lieutenant Đura E. Đaković, a transport pilot with Aeroput. The initial testing justified all expectations in terms of aerodynamic characteristics and performance, unfortunately on the third flight the pilot was unable to lower the landing gear and had to land with the undercarriage extended, damaging the propellers and engines. Replacement parts for the propeller and landing gear were imported from Germany and France delaying repairs considerably. The aircraft was rebuilt so that testing could be resumed at the end of March 1941, but in early April the bombing of Zemun airport damaged the prototype Zmaj R-1 again. In late June 1941 the Germans scrapped the aircraft.

This twin-engine mid-winged aircraft, powered by two 750 PS (552 kW; 740 hp) Hispano-Suiza 14AB, was of mixed construction and well-armed, with two 20 mm (0.787 in) Oerlikon cannon, and four 7.9 mm (0.311 in) machine guns, with 1,600 kg (3,500 lb) of bombs in a fuselage bomb-bay. The reconnaissance variant carried cameras, extra fuel tanks and three crew members in lieu of guns and bombs.

== Operational history ==
Due to the cessation of flight testing the plans for the Yugoslav Royal Air Force reconnaissance and bomber units to be solely equipped with the Zmaj R-1 came to naught.

== Operators ==
Kingdom of Yugoslavia

- Royal Yugoslav Air Force 1 aircraft

== Specifications ==
Data from

General characteristics

- Crew: 3–4
- Length: 12.78 m (41 ft 11 in)
- Wingspan: 14.40 m (47 ft 3 in)
- Height: 2.50 m (8 ft 2 in)
- Wing area: 33.80 m^{2} (363.8 sq ft)
- Empty weight: 2,600 kg (5,732 lb)
- Gross weight: 5,094 kg (11,230 lb)
- Max takeoff weight: 5,664 kg (12,487 lb)
- Powerplant: 2 × Hispano-Suiza 14AB 14-cyl. air-cooled radial piston engine, 552 kW (740 hp) each
- Propellers: 3-bladed

Performance

- Maximum speed: 450 km/h (280 mph, 240 kn)
- Cruise speed: 320 km/h (200 mph, 170 kn)
- Range: 1,000 km (620 mi, 540 nmi)
- Service ceiling: 10,000 m (33,000 ft)
- Rate of climb: 5.55 m/s (1,093 ft/min)

Armament

- Guns: 2x 20 mm (0.787 in) Oerlikon cannon, and 4x 7.9 mm (0.311 in) machine guns
- Bombs: 1,600 kg (3,500 lb) of bombs carried internally

== See also ==
- Yugoslav Royal Air Force
- Dušan Stankov
- Ikarus 215
- Rogožarski R-313
- Ikarus Orkan
