= Hispano-Suiza 14AB =

1930s French radial aircraft engine

14AB
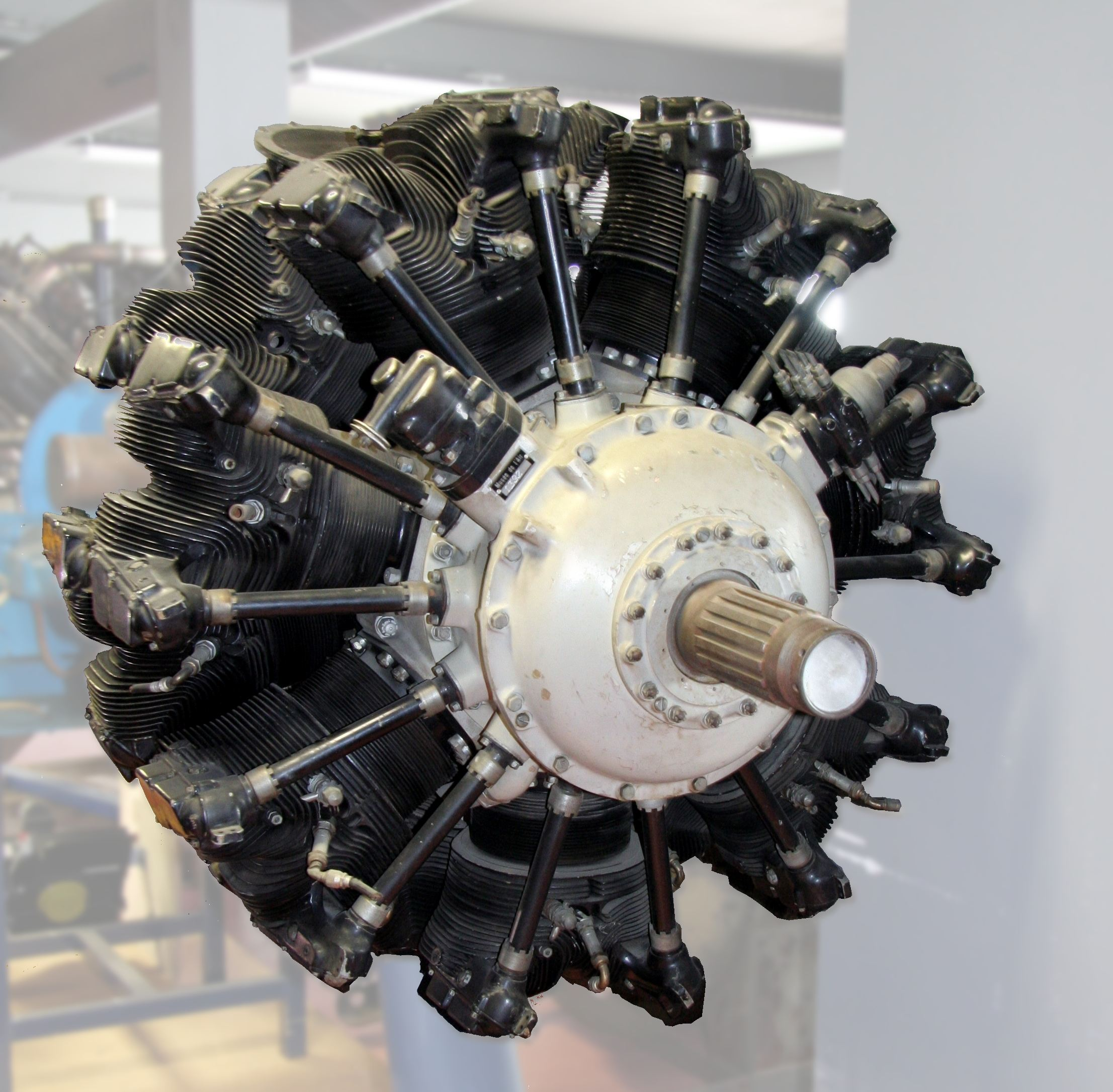
- Type: Radial engine
- Manufacturer: Hispano-Suiza
- First run: 1930s

The Hispano-Suiza 14AB, a.k.a. Hispano-Suiza Type 80, was a 14-cylinder twin-row air-cooled radial engine. In 1929 the Hispano-Suiza company bought a license to produce the Wright Whirlwind engine. The technology from that engine was used to produce a number of different radial engines with greater displacements, power, and number of cylinders.

The most significant of this series of engines was the 14AB, which was a very compact design with relatively good performance, and some 2,500 engines were produced. The 14AB suffered from cooling problems, and many aircraft originally designed for the 14AB were redesigned to use the more reliable Gnome-Rhône 14M series of engines or imported Wright and Pratt & Whitney R-1535 engines.

== Variants ==
Data from Lage 2004

14AB-00
Clockwise (CW) rotation, 670 hp (500 kW) at 2,400 rpm at 3,500 m (11,500 ft)
14AB-01
Counter-clockwise (CCW) rotation version of -00
14AB-02
CW, 680 hp (510 kW) at 2,400 rpm at 3,500 m (11,500 ft)
14AB-03
CCW version of -02
14AB-10
CW, 725 hp (541 kW) at 2,400 rpm at 3,500 m (11,500 ft)
14AB-11
CCW version of -10
14AB-12
CW, 745 hp (556 kW) at 2,400 rpm at 700 m (2,300 ft)
14AB-13
CCW version of -12
14AC
Type 88
A projected 470 hp (350 kW) single row, nine-cylinder development of the 14AB
Type 93
A projected 420 hp (310 kW) single row, seven-cylinder development of the 14AC, intended for the Hispano HS-42

== Applications ==
- Potez 630
- Breguet 691
- Zmaj R-1

== Specifications (Hispano-Suiza 14AB-00) ==
Data from Tsygulev, 1939

=== General characteristics ===
- Type: Fourteen-cylinder two-row supercharged air-cooled radial engine
- Bore: 135 mm (5.31 in)
- Stroke: 130 mm (5.12 in)
- Displacement: 26.05 L (1,590 in³)
- Length: 1,530 mm (60.24 in)
- Diameter: 1,010 mm (39.76 in)
- Dry weight: 495 kg (1,091 lb)

=== Components ===
- Valvetrain: Two overhead valves per cylinder
- Supercharger: Single-speed centrifugal type supercharger, 9.38:1 reduction
- Fuel system: Carburetor
- Fuel type: 87 octane rating gasoline
- Cooling system: Air-cooled
- Reduction gear: 1.6:1

=== Performance ===
- Power output:
- 475 kW (637 hp) at 2,400 rpm for takeoff
- 501 kW (671 hp) at 2,400 rpm at 3,500 m (11,485 ft)
- Specific power: 19.23 kW/L (0.42 hp/in³)
- Specific fuel consumption: 322 g/(kW•h) (0.53 lb/(hp•h))
- Oil consumption: 12 g/(kW•h) (0.32 oz/(hp•h))
- Power-to-weight ratio: 1.01 kW/kg (0.62 hp/lb)

== See also ==
Related lists

- List of aircraft engines
