= Fizir F1V =

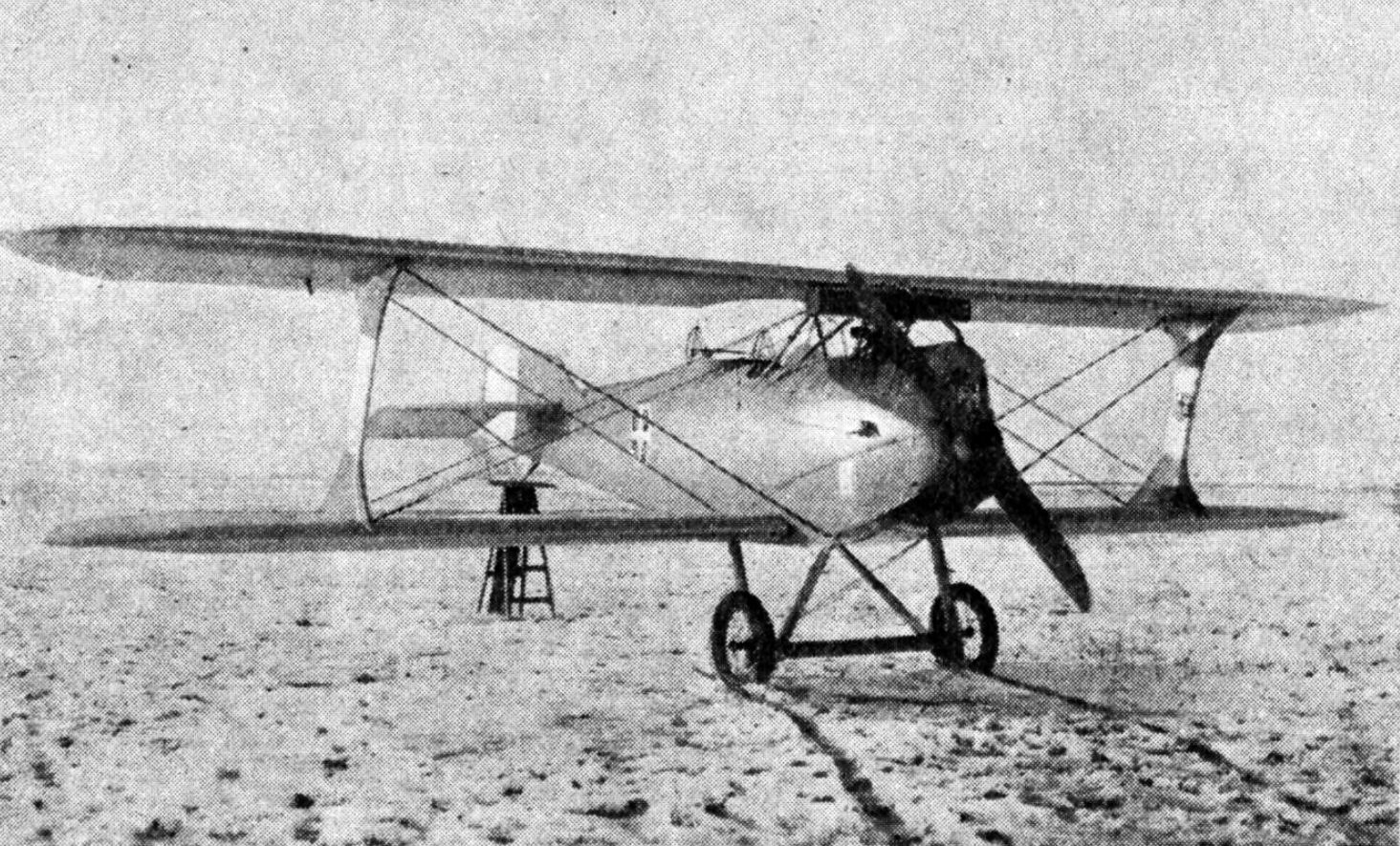
- Fizir F1V (Fizir-Maybach 260)

General information
- Type: Advanced trainer
- National origin: Yugoslavia
- Manufacturer: Prva Srpska Fabrika Aeroplana Zivojin Rogozarski, Belgrade and Fabrika Aeroplana i hidroaviona Zmaj Zemun
- Designer: Rudolf Fizir; D. Stankov
- Status: retired
- Primary user: Yugoslav Royal Air Force
- Number built: 56

History
- Manufactured: from 1928 to 1932
- Introduction date: 1928
- First flight: November 1925
- Retired: 1941
- Developed from: Fizir F1

The Fizir F1V (Serbian Cyrillic:Физир Ф1В) was the basis from which engineer Rudolf Fizir developed a series of single-engined, two-seat, reconnaissance biplanes fitted with different engines. Construction was carried out in the Yugoslav aircraft factories Zmaj and Rogožarski between 1928 and 1932.

== Design and development ==
Rudolf Fizir designed a biplane reconnaissance aircraft during the first war of the Kingdom of Yugoslavia (KSHS) during 1925. It was equipped with a 260 hp Maybach engine and the prototype was made in the workshop of the Novi Sad Air Aviation Regiment. The prototype was first flown in late November 1925 by test pilot Vladimir Striževski. Further development of the basic Fizir design was undertaken with the assistance of Dušan Stankov resulting in the construction of five additional prototypes and the delivery of 32 production machines designated Fizir F1V (commonly referred to as "Fizir-Maybach 260 hp") over the next three years. While these had been built at the Rogožarski factory, Zmaj built 15 of the Fizir F1V-Wright version and 5 Jupiter-engined Fizir F1M floatplanes for Naval Aviation in 1930. Zmaj was also responsible for conversion of several Fizir-Maybach trainers to Lorraine-Dietrich engines in 1932, which extended the service life of these machines under the new name Fizir-Lorraine 400 hp.

== Operational history ==
Just after the factory tests, on 8 October 1926 pilot Vladimir Striževski flew the aircraft from Novi Sad to Skopje to Mostar to Rajlovac (Sarajevo) to Zagreb and returned to Novi Sad – a distance of 1,410 km – over a period of 8 hours and 40 minutes.

As a result of this performance, the aircraft was entered in an international competition of the Little Entente in Poland where it was one of 14 entries. Though some of the other competitors had aircraft with twice the power, it came in first place.

Thanks to this success and satisfactory test results, it was decided to put the Fizir F1V into serial production, but as an intermediate trainer rather than as a reconnaissance aircraft with the result that some changes were made, such as adding dual controls. Difficulties with supplies of the original Maybach engine resulted in a variety of other engines being fitted, from which the individual variants would derive their names.

The Fizir F1V was used at the flying schools to transition pupils to reconnaissance and bomber aircraft, replacing the worn-out Hansa-Brandenburg C.I as production permitted. Twenty examples were produced by the end of the 1928 and 12 in 1929. The Fizir F1V aircraft used by the pilot schools were withdrawn from service and replaced with the new Zmaj Fizir FP-2 in 1936. Some examples of these aircraft had flown by the beginning of April and were still in use when war started in 1941 as a liaison aircraft or training.

Last flight from the family of these types of aircraft Fizir F1M (Fizir first Navy) was a seaplane that was developed at "Zmaj" by Zemun on the request of the Navy Command for a reconnaissance seaplane on floats. Known as Zmaj Fizir-Jupiter or "Big Fizir" they were used in the Naval Air Force for as a reconnaissance seaplane and for towing targets for antiaircraft training. On one of these aircraft was fitted with an NACA ring in 1931 to improve the Jupiter engine's cooling and reduce drag. These aircraft flew during the war and three were captured by the Italians however it is unknown if they made any use of them.

== Operators ==
Kingdom of Yugoslavia

- Yugoslav Royal Air Force
- Yugoslav Royal Navy

Croatia

- Air Force of the Independent State of Croatia (5 ex-Yugoslav Royal Air Force examples)

== Variants ==
- Fizir F1 – Prototype with a 190 kW (260 hp) Maybach Mb.IVa (1 example, 1925)
- Fizir F1V-Maybach – 190 kW (260 hp) Maybach Mb.IVa (32 examples, 1928)
- Fizir F1V-Loren – 340 kW (450 hp) Lorraine-Dietrich 12Eb W-12 engine (1st prototype converted 1928 + 15 Lorraine conversion Maybach 12 dB 400KS in 1933)
- Fizir F1V-Hispano – 340 kW (450 hp) Hispano-Suiza 12G V-12 engine, (1 prototype converted in 1928)
- Fizir F1V-Wright – 160 kW (220 hp) Wright Whirlwind J-5 radial engine, (1 prototype and 15 production examples in 1930)
- Fizir F1M-Jupiter – a naval seaplane (also called "The Great Fizir") with 310 kW (420 hp) Gnome-Rhône 9A / IAM 9AD radial engine (5 examples in 1930)
- Fizir F1G-Castor – 180 kW (240 hp) Walter Castor 7 cylinder radial engine, (1 prototype in 1931)
- Fizir F1G-Titan – 170 kW (230 hp) Bristol Titan 7-cylinder radial engine, (1 prototype in 1931)
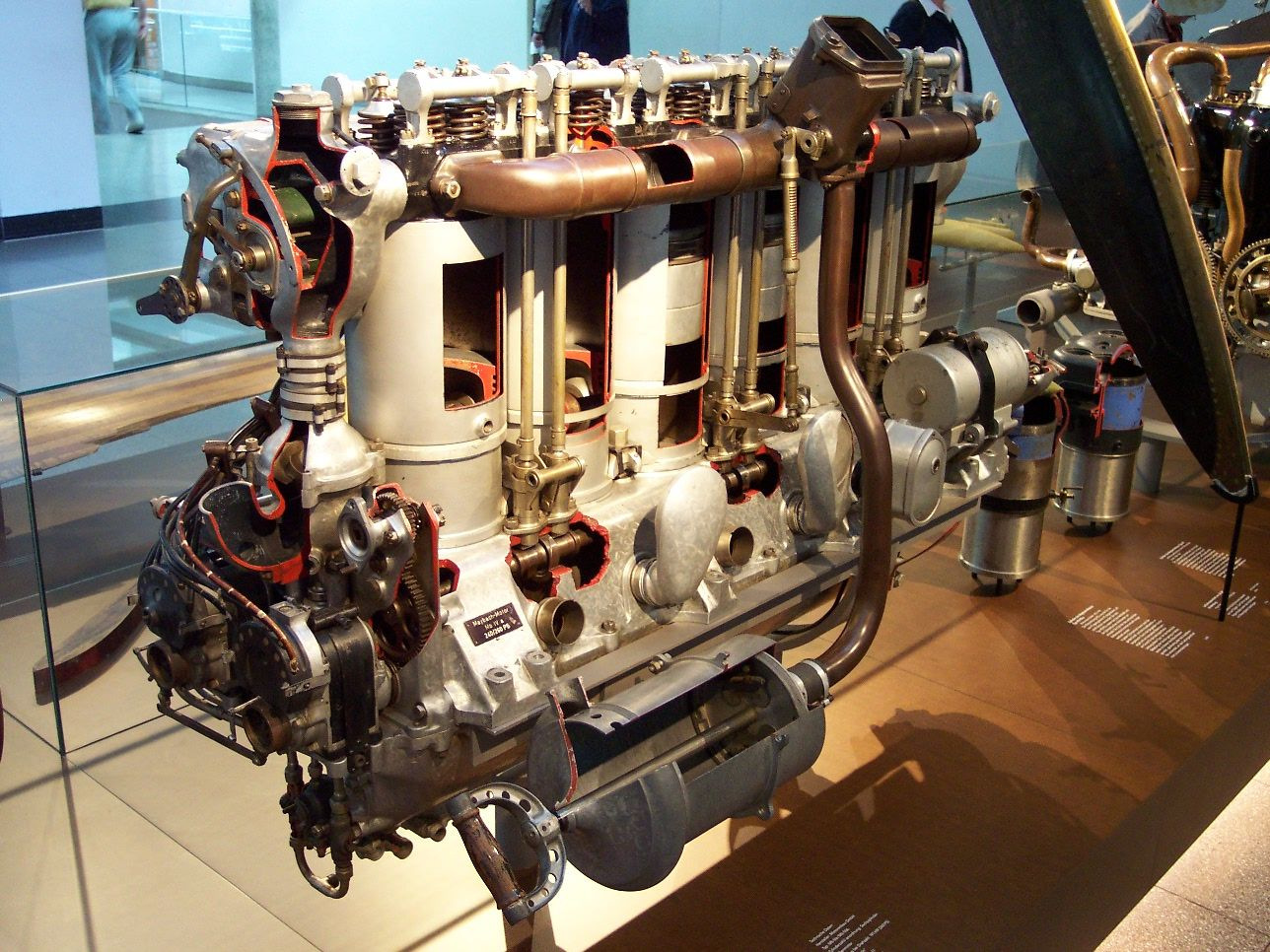
Maybach Mb IVa engine installed in aircraft Fizir F1V-Maybach.

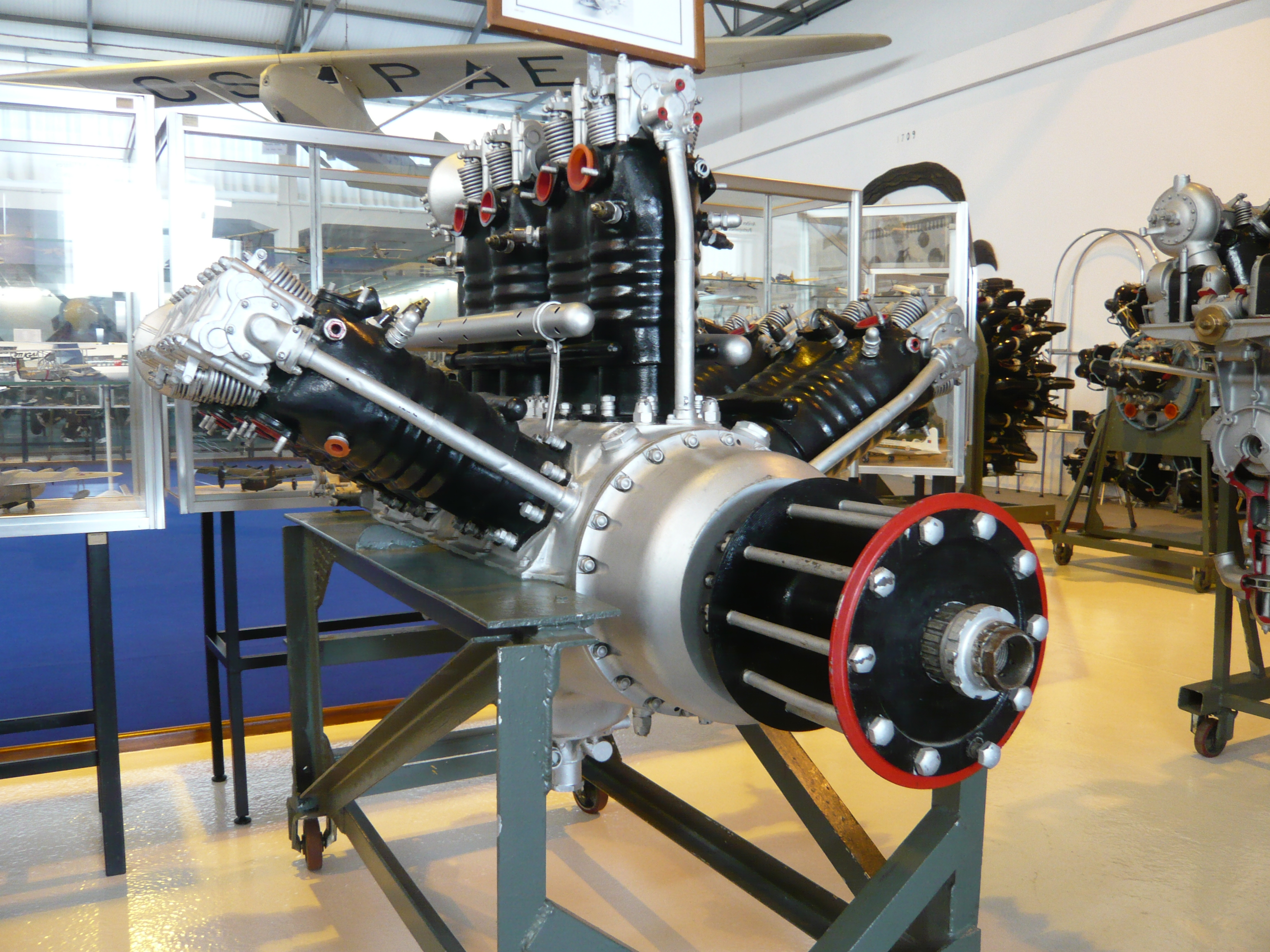
Lorraine Dietrich 12Eb engine installed in aircraft Fizir F1V-Loren.

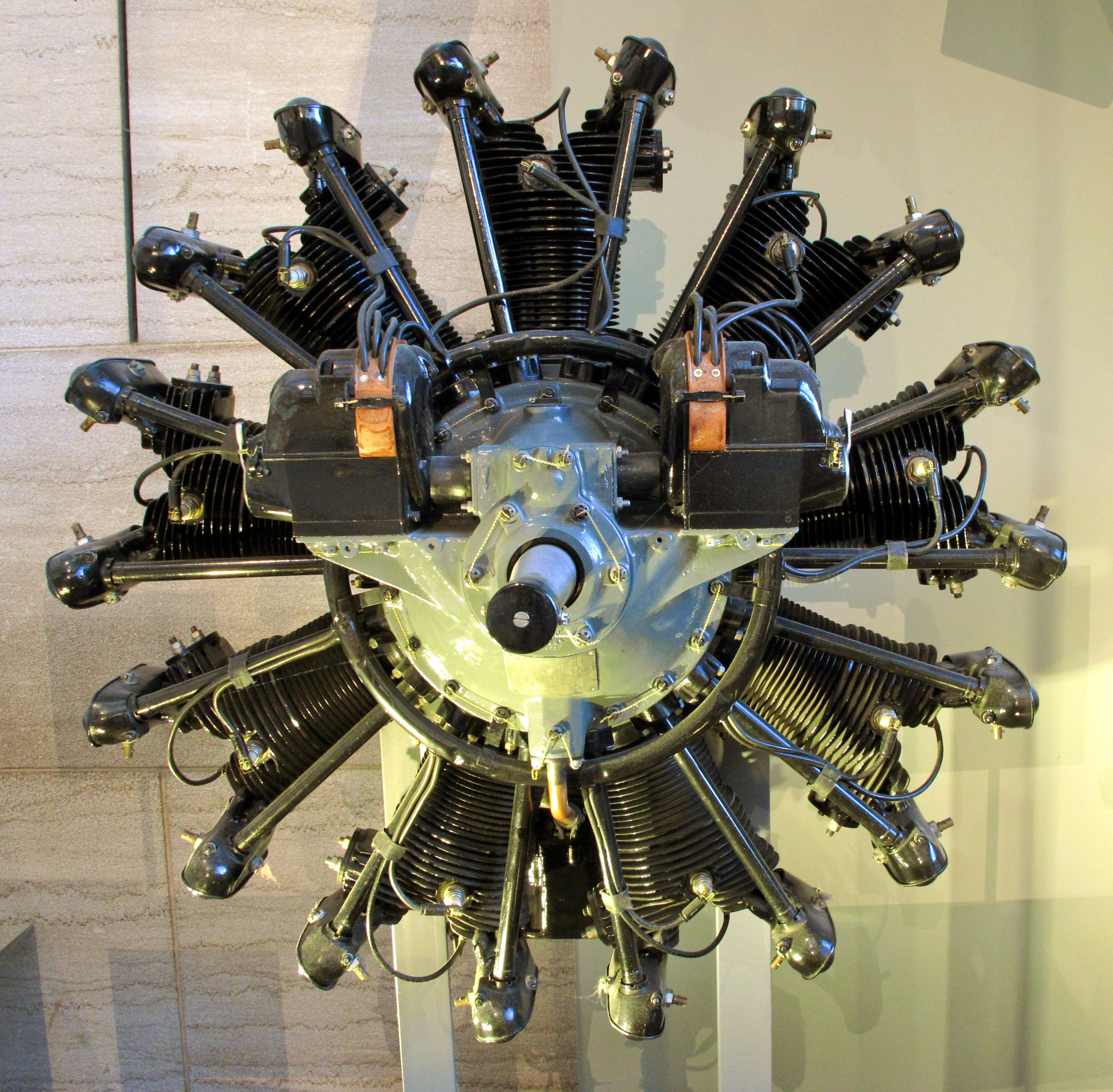
Wright J-5 engine installed in aircraft Fizir F1V-Wright.

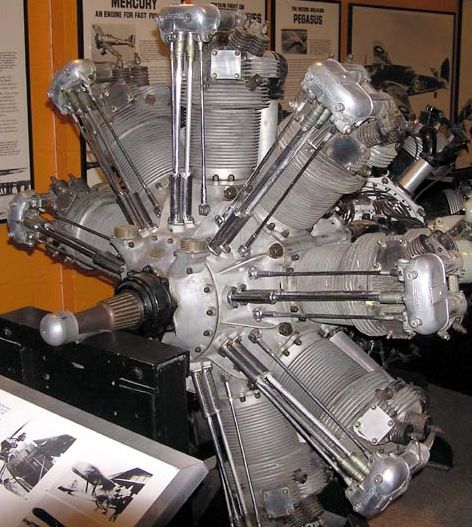
Jupiter 9A engine installed in aircraft Fizir F1M-Jupiter.

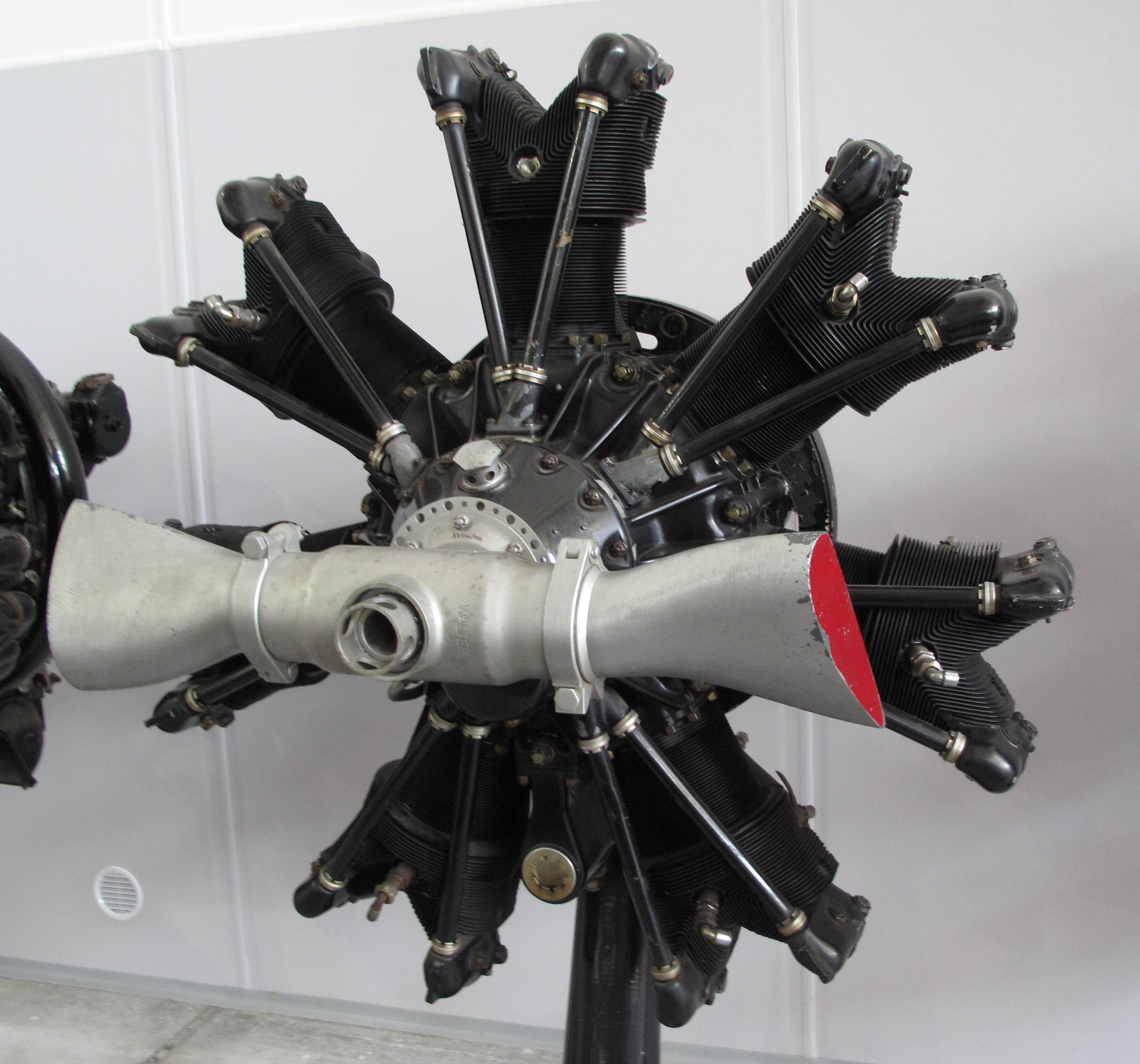
Walter Castor engine installed in aircraft Fizir F1G-Castor.

== Specifications (F1V-Maybach) ==
Data from

General characteristics

- Crew: 2
- Length: 10.21 m (33 ft 6 in)
- Wingspan: 12.71 m (41 ft 8 in)
- Height: 3.10 m (10 ft 2 in)
- Empty weight: 1,100 kg (2,425 lb)
- Gross weight: 1,450 kg (3,197 lb)
- Powerplant: 1 × Maybach Mb.IVa 6-cylinder inline, 190 kW (260 hp)

Performance

- Maximum speed: 176 km/h (109 mph, 95 kn) at sea level
- Service ceiling: 6,000 m (20,000 ft)
- Rate of climb: 3.46 m/s (681 ft/min) to 5,000 m (16,405 ft)

== See also ==
- Dušan Stankov
- Rudolf Fizir
- Zmaj Fizir FN
