= Zmaj Fizir FN =

Plane designed for primary (initial) training of pilots in Yugoslavia

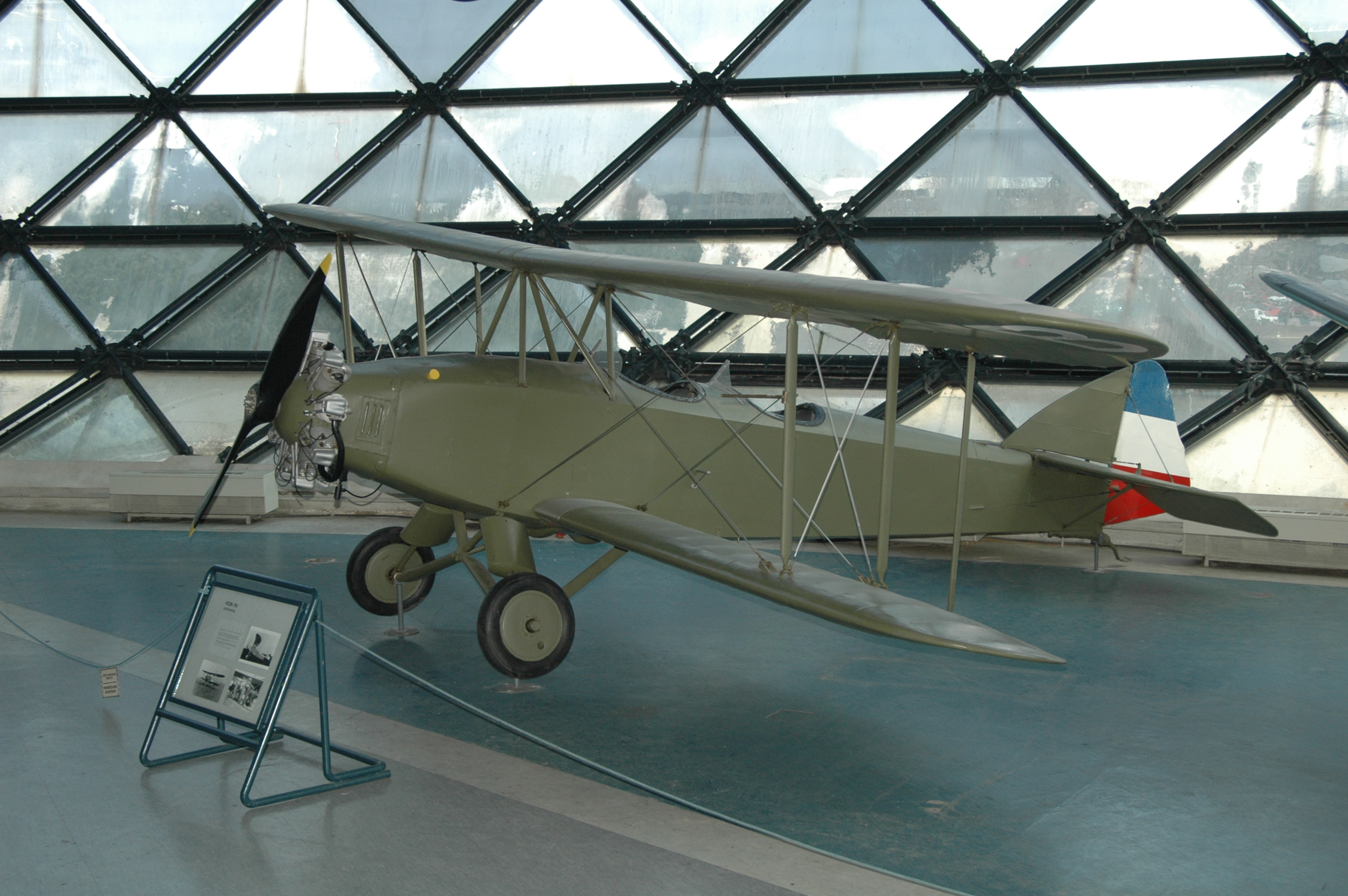
- Fizir FN on display in the Museum of Aviation

General information
- Type: Trainer aircraft
- National origin: Yugoslav
- Manufacturer: Zmaj aircraft, Rogožarski Albatros Sremska Mitrovica
- Designer: Rudolf Fizir, Dušan Stankov and Ivan Rukavina
- Primary user: Yugoslav Royal Air Force
- Number built: 206+ 4 Floatplane

History
- Introduction date: 1931
- First flight: May 1929
- Retired: 1950

The Zmaj Fizir FN (Serbian Cyrillic: Змај Физир ФН) was a plane designed for primary (initial) training of pilots in Yugoslavia before World War II. It was constructed in Zmaj, a Zemun-based factory, in the Rogožarski factory in Belgrade, and Albatros in Sremska Mitrovica.

Fizir FN had an exceptional low-speed stability, a desirable trait for a training aircraft, and was reliable and easy to maintain. It was also widely used as a sport aircraft.

== Design and development ==
The first prototype of Fizir FN (Fizir trainer) aircraft was designed and manufactured in Rudolf Fizir Workshop in Petrovaradin in 1929. Rudolf Fizir's workshop lacked any mass production capacity, their specialty being design work and prototyping. Although small, this workshop played a significant role in the development of Yugoslav aeronautics and trained engineers. Some prototypes from this workshop were later produced in Yugoslav airplane factories.

Fizir FN was a single-engine two-seat biplane trainer with a single pair of struts on each side. The wings were rounded at the tips and ailerons were located on both the lower and upper wings. The landing gear was attached to the fuselage. Early examples used coil springs with rubber blocks while later examples used oleo pneumatic suspension. The wood structure of the fuselage and the wings was covered with fabric. While the aircraft was in production, it was continually being refined, and there were several sub-types with different engines.

== Operational history ==
The first three aircraft was produced by the Zmaj aircraft factory for the Aero Club. Given excellent flight characteristics, the Air Force Command decided to use it to replace all training aircraft that had been in use for basic training previously. At that time basic pilot training schools used the Ikarus SB-1 (Mali Brandenburg) with a 73 kW (98 hp) Mercedes engine, Zmaj built Hanriot H-320 with 90 kW (120 hp) Salmson engines manufactured in 1928. In the beginning of 1931, Zmaj produced and delivered first 20 serial Fizir FN aircraft with the Walter NZ 120 radial engine and 10 with the 89 kW (120 hp) Mercedes D.II inline engine. By 1939, Zmaj produced 137 aircraft, Rogožarski fabricated 40 aircraft and in the 1940 the Sremska Mitrovica-based Albatros factory produced additional 20 aircraft of this type. Before the war, the Navy Aviation ordered four hydro Fizir FN (Floatplane) with floats and with a more powerful 106 kW (142 hp) Walter Mars I engine. The production of last 10 Fizir FN aircraft started in 1943 in Zmaj for the Croatian Air Force, but were not finished until the liberation, when they were handed over to the Aeronautical Federation of Yugoslavia.

During World War II, Yugoslav-manufactured aircraft were used by Italy in Albania, and by the Independent State of Croatia. Aircraft Fizir FN was reliable, easy to fly and maintain, so this plane stayed operative for many years (almost till 1950), as basic pilot training aircraft, both in military and civilian aviation, including sports flying.

There are two surviving Fizir FN aircraft. One (serial number 9009, registration YU-CAY) is kept in the Museum of Yugoslav aviation at Belgrade Nikola Tesla airport. The other, designated Fizir FNH, which is a Fizir FN converted to a floatplane (serial number 9002, registration YU-CGO), is kept in Technical Museum, Zagreb.

== Operators ==
Kingdom of Yugoslavia

- Royal Yugoslav Air Force 206 aircraft

Yugoslavia

- SFR Yugoslav Air Force – Postwar.
- Letalski center Maribor (Civil operator) – Postwar

Croatia

- Air Force of the Independent State of Croatia 23 ex-Royal Yugoslav Air Force

Italy

- Regia Aeronautica

== Variants ==
- Fizir FN – Mercedes – with the engine Mercedes 88 kW,
- Fizir FN – Walter – with the engine Walter NZ-120 88 kW and
- Fizir FN – Walter Mars I – seaplane with the engine Walter Mars I 106 kW, (seaplane nicknamed "Little Fizir" or "Fizir Mars").

== Specifications ==
Data from

General characteristics

- Crew: 2
- Length: 8.80 m (28 ft 10 in)
- Wingspan: 11.20 m (36 ft 9 in)
- Height: 3.10 m (10 ft 2 in)
- Wing area: 32.50 m^{2} (349.8 sq ft)
- Empty weight: 820 kg (1,808 lb)
- Gross weight: 1,426 kg (3,144 lb)
- Powerplant: 1 × Walter NZ 120 7-cylinder radial, 88 kW (118 hp)
- Propellers: 2-bladed

Performance

- Maximum speed: 140 km/h (87 mph, 76 kn)
- Cruise speed: 120 km/h (75 mph, 65 kn)
- Range: 540 km (340 mi, 290 nmi)
- Service ceiling: 6,500 m (21,300 ft)

== See also ==
- Rogožarski AZR
- Fizir F1V
- Rogožarski PVT
- Mercedes D.II
- Rudolf Fizir
- Dušan Stankov
