= Rogožarski =

Yugoslav aircraft manufacturer

- Company type: Joint stock company
- Industry: Aerospace
- Founded: 22 April 1924
- Founder: Živojin Rogožarski
- Defunct: 1946
- Fate: Nationalised and merged with Ikarus in 1946
- Successor: Ikarus
- Headquarters: Belgrade, Yugoslavia
- Key people: Sima Milutinović
- Owner: General Commercial Bank

Rogožarski (Serbian Cyrillic: Рогожарски) was a Yugoslav aircraft manufacturer based in Belgrade.

== History ==
Officially established on 22 April 1924 under the name First Serbian Aircraft Factory of Živojin Rogožarski (Serbo-Croatian: Prva Srpska fabrika aeroplana Živojin Rogožarski), the company was responsible for most of Yugoslavia's air industry in the interwar period, along with Ikarus. Initially, it repaired aircraft which had been confiscated during World War I, but soon started manufacturing its own models, as well as license producing aircraft from abroad. After the company was nationalised by the Yugoslav government in 1946, the factory was merged together with Zmaj into Ikarus, which continued in the aeronautical industry until 1962. During its existence, Rogožarski produced a total of 286 aircraft.

== Aircraft ==
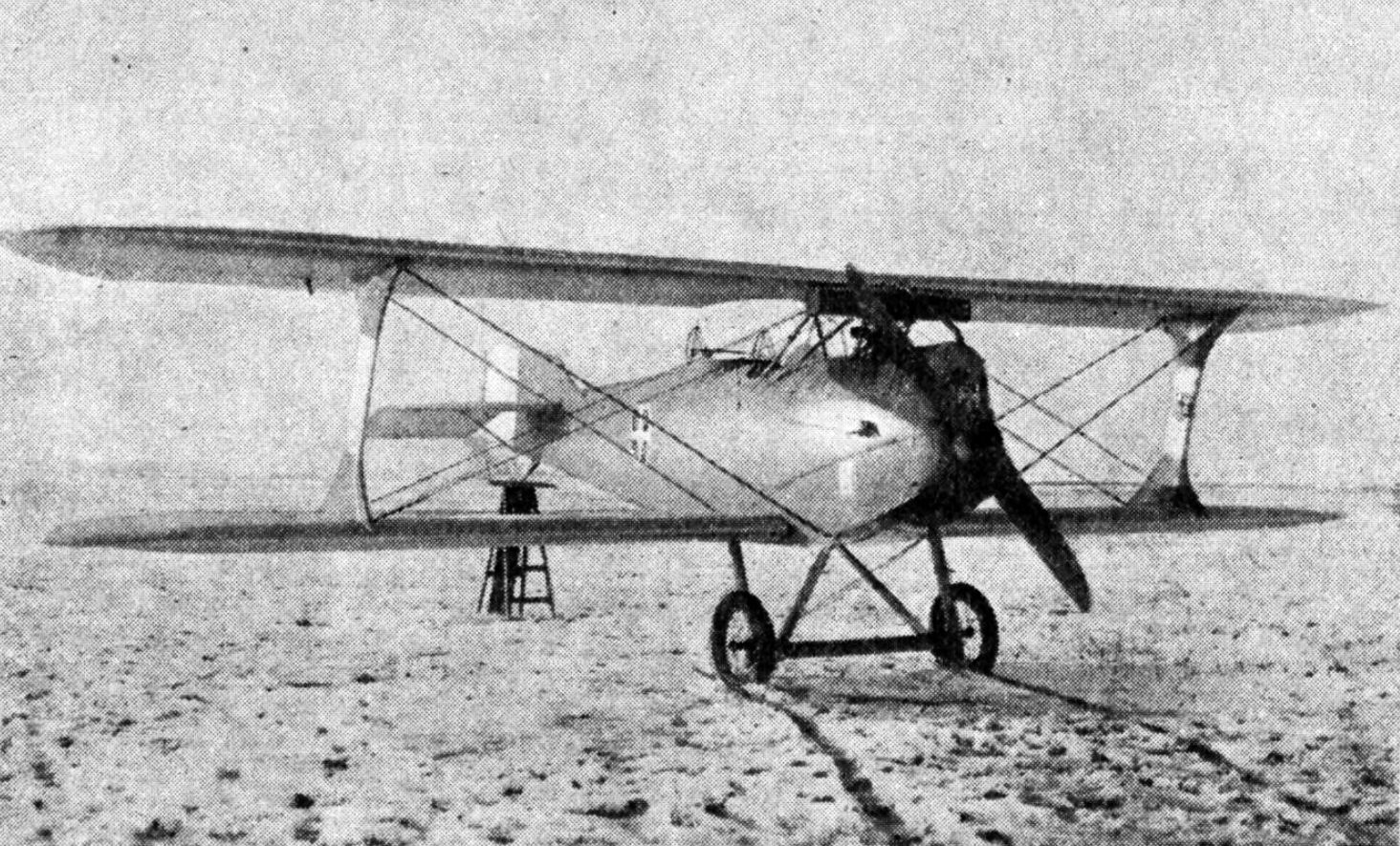
F1V

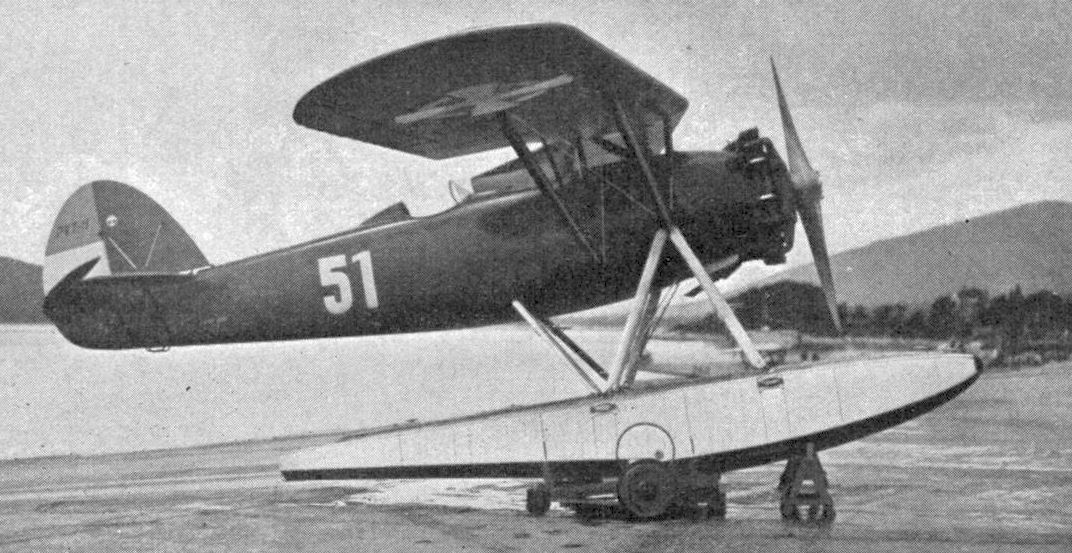
PVT-H

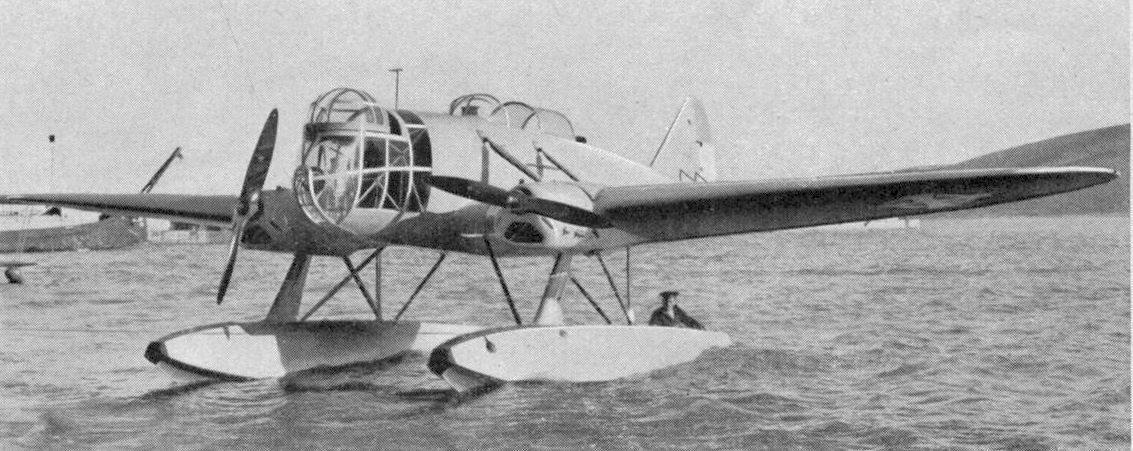
SIM-XIV-H

Model name	First flight	Number built	Type
Rogožarski F1V	1925	37 (Note: An additional 20 aircraft were built by Zmaj.)	Single engine biplane trainer
Rogožarski AZR	1930	1	Single engine biplane trainer
Rogožarski PVT	1934	61	Single engine biplane trainer
Rogožarski Fizir FN		40 (Note: An additional 167 aircraft were built by Zmaj and Albatross.)	Single engine biplane trainer
Rogožarski SIM-X	1936	21	Single engine monoplane trainer
Rogožarski IK-3	1938	13	Single engine monoplane fighter
Rogožarski R-100	1938	26	Single engine monoplane trainer
Rogožarski SIM-VI	1937	2	Single engine monoplane trainer
Rogožarski SIM-XI	1938	1	Single engine monoplane trainer
Rogožarski SIM-XII-H	1938	9	Single engine monoplane floatplane trainer
Rogožarski SIM-VIII	1931	3 (Note: An additional 2 aircraft were built by Ikarus.)	Single engine monoplane trainer
Rogožarski SIM-XIV-H	1938	19	Twin engine monoplane floatplane bomber
Rogožarski Brucoš	1940	1	Single engine monoplane trainer
Rogožarski R-313	1940	1	Twin engine monoplane light bomber
Rogožarski B.I			
Rogožarski C.I			
Rogožarski RWD 8		3	License built single engine monoplane trainer
Rogožarski RWD 13		6	License built Single engine monoplane touring airplane
Rogožarski Hurricane			License built single engine monoplane fighter

== See also ==
- Aircraft industry of Serbia
