= Rogožarski SIM-XI =

Monoplane built in the Kingdom of Yugoslavia

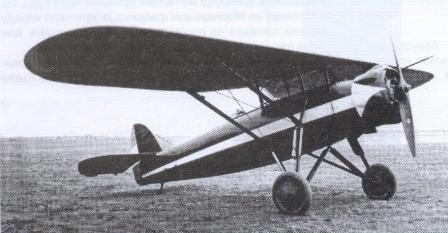

General information
- Type: aerobatic trainer
- National origin: Yugoslavia
- Manufacturer: Rogožarski
- Designer: Sima Milutinović
- Primary user: Yugoslav Royal Air Force
- Number built: 1

History
- Manufactured: from 1937 to 1941
- Introduction date: 1938
- First flight: 1938
- Retired: 1944
- Developed from: Rogožarski SIM-X

The Rogožarski SIM-XI (Serbian Cyrillic: Рогожарски СИМ-XI) was a single-seat, single-engine trainer monoplane built in the Kingdom of Yugoslavia in 1938. It was designed and built at the Rogožarski factory in Belgrade.

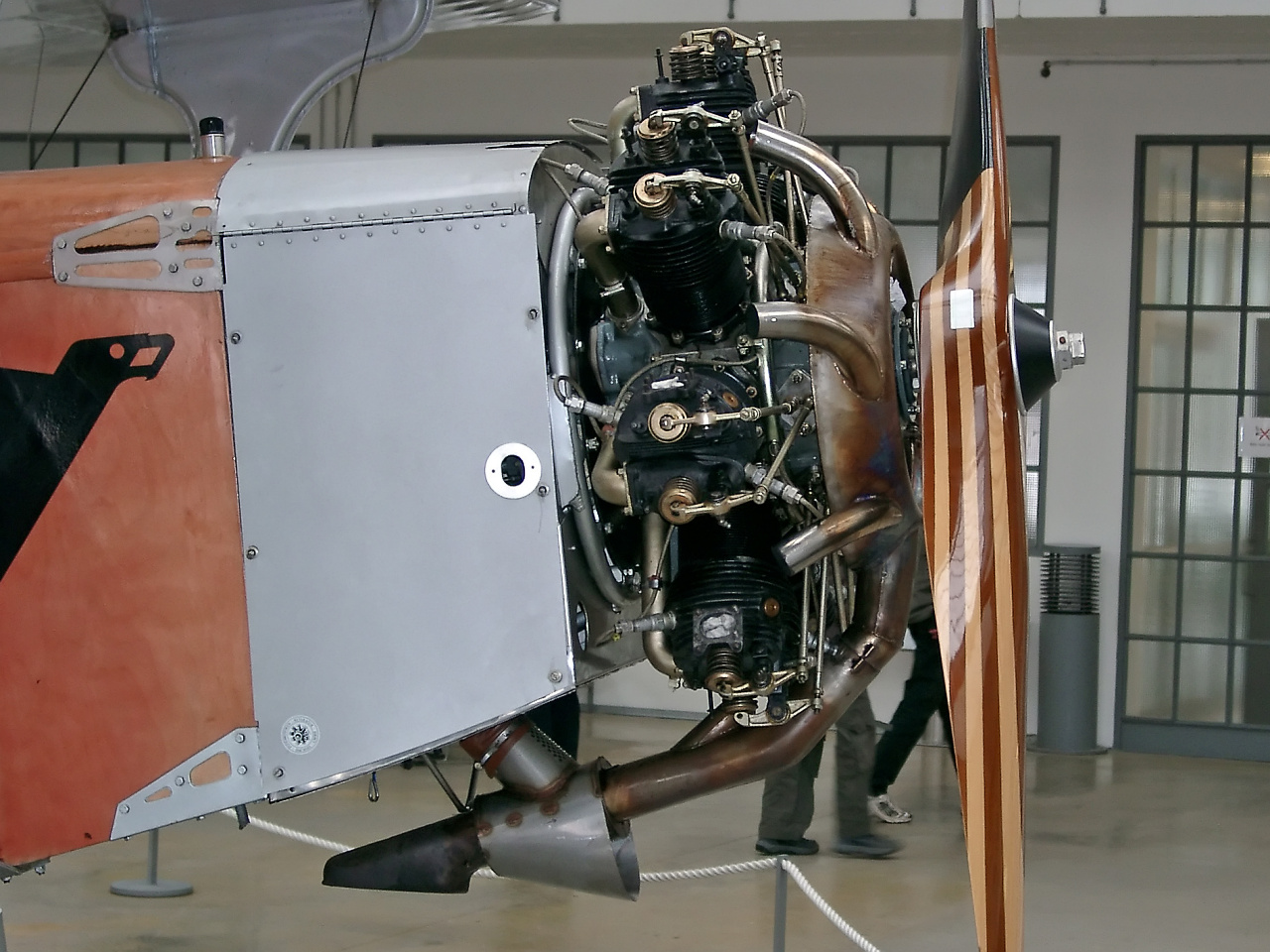
Siemens Sh 14a engine installed in aircraft Rogožarski SIM-XI

== Design and development ==
When examining the earlier SIM-X, it was observed that it had aerobatic characteristics, so the factory management decided to install a more powerful engine with a carburetor for inverted flights, reduce the lower wing struts, reduce the wing area and make the construction more flexible to give a more aerobatic aircraft. The renowned Yugoslav engineer Sima Milutinović was consulted in 1937 to implement the necessary changes. The first test flight was by factory test pilot Captain Milan Bjelanović in January 1938. Starting 12 March 1938, tests were conducted by the Yugoslav Royal Air Force. The plane got excellent grades and the YRAF bought the prototype SIM-XI.

The SIM-XI was a monoplane with a single carbureted 150 hp Siemens (Bram) Sh14a, engine. The plane was of mostly wooden structure, with an elliptical cross-section of fuselage made entirely of wood covered with plywood, and wooden wings covered with cloth, with rounded ends. On each side, the wings were supported by a pair of inclined struts attached to the fuselage. The aircraft had two fuel tanks, one located at the junction of the wings, the other in the fuselage. The fuselage tank was filled for aerobatics, and the wing tank was filled for normal flights. Both tanks were filled during flights when it was needed to travel greater distances. The landing gear was fixed, completely made of steel tubes, which were strong enough for the plane to be able to land on rugged terrain.

== Operational history ==
The Rogožarski factory designed the SIM-XI with the intention of keeping resources of fighter aircraft as part of standard air force armaments arsenal while enabling YRAF pilots to continue aerobatics training on cheaper aircraft without affecting the quality of the training. However, the YRAF was of the opinion that for this purpose, the standard aircraft used for training fighter pilots (PVT and R-100) were sufficient. Some of these had carburetors for inverted flying installed and so the SIM-XI did not go into production.

During the first international aviation exhibition in Belgrade, the SIM-XI performed a series of highly acclaimed aerobatic flights, confirming the fact that it belonged to a group of the best aerobatic aircraft at the time, which was used another credit to acclaimed engineer Sima Milutinovic, to the Rogožarski factory and the Yugoslav aviation.

During the invasion of Yugoslavia by the Axis the SIM-XI fell into the hands of the Germans and they handed it over to the puppet state, the Independent State of Croatia (ISC) where they designated it under the code 7351. The Croats used it until 19 December 1943, for glider towing, until partisans destroyed it between the villages of Progar and Boljevci when a Croatian pilot landed in order to reattach and lift the hook that had fallen off.

== Operators ==
Kingdom of Yugoslavia

- Royal Yugoslav Air Force 1 aircraft

Croatia (ISC)

- Air Force of the Independent State of Croatia 1 ex-Royal Yugoslav Air Force

== Specifications ==
Data from Станојевић, Д,

General characteristics

- Crew: 1
- Length: 7.16 m (23 ft 6 in)
- Wingspan: 9.40 m (30 ft 10 in)
- Height: 2.70 m (8 ft 10 in)
- Wing area: 17.30 m^{2} (186.2 sq ft)
- Empty weight: 540 kg (1,190 lb)
- Gross weight: 680 kg (1,499 lb)
- Powerplant: 1 × Siemens-Halske Sh 14 7-cylinder radial, 110 kW (150 hp)
- Propellers: 2-bladed

Performance

- Maximum speed: 191 km/h (119 mph, 103 kn)
- Cruise speed: 168 km/h (104 mph, 91 kn)
- Minimum control speed: 88 km/h (55 mph, 48 kn)
- Range: 825 km (513 mi, 445 nmi)
- Service ceiling: 5,500 m (18,000 ft)
- Rate of climb: 4.87 m/s (959 ft/min)

== See also ==
- Rogožarski SIM-XII-H
- Rogožarski PVT
- Rogožarski R-100
