= Rogožarski R-313 =

Yugoslav air force plane in WWII

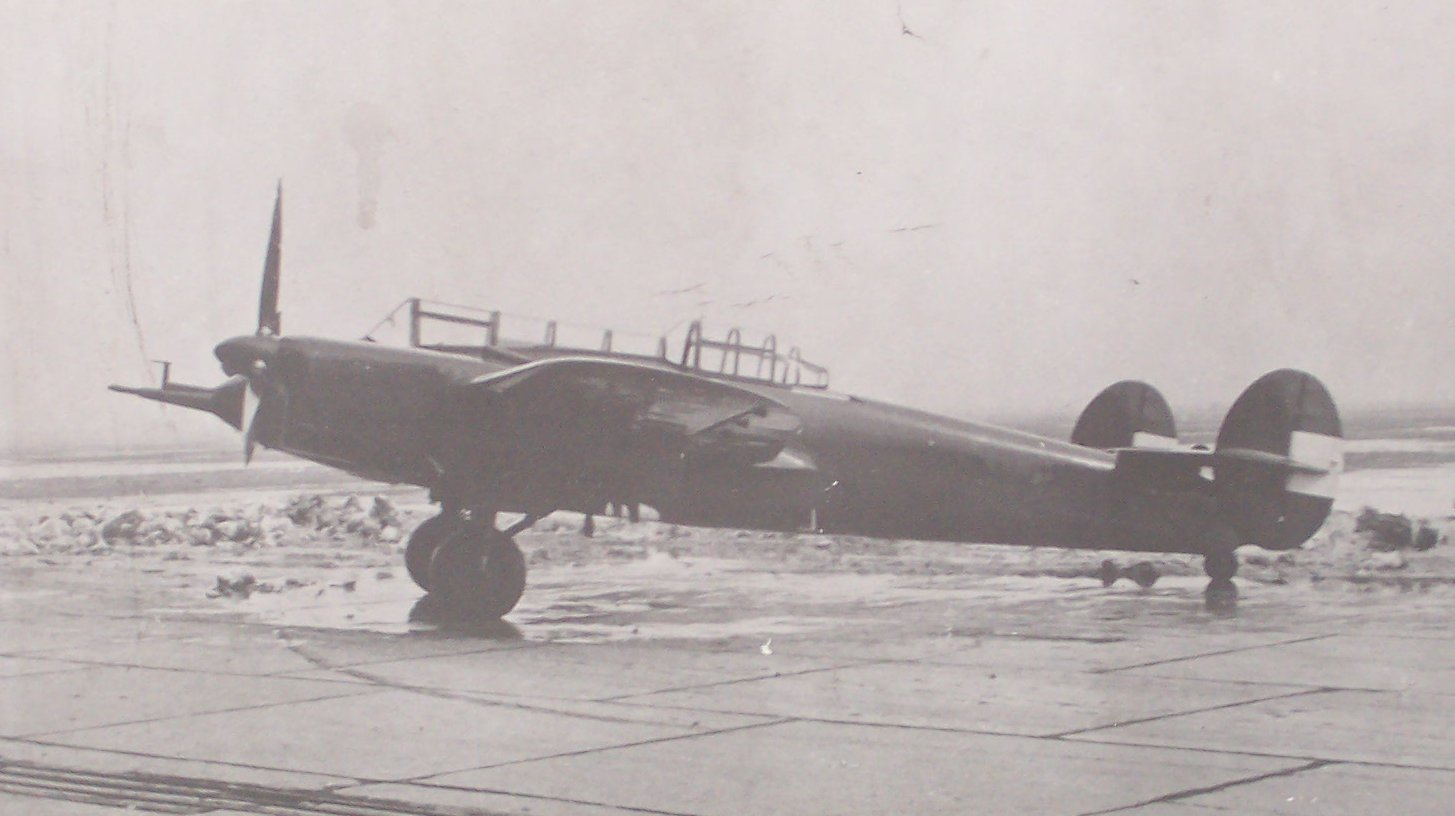

General information
- Type: multi-purpose combat aircraft
- National origin: Yugoslavia
- Manufacturer: Prva Srpska Fabrika Aeroplana Živojin Rogožarski, Belgrade
- Designer: Sima Milutinović
- Status: inactive
- Primary user: Yugoslav Royal Air Force
- Number built: 1

History
- First flight: 1939
- Retired: 1942

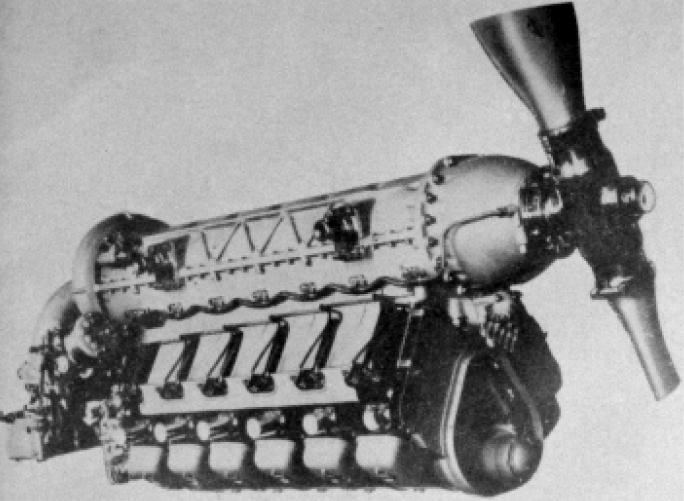
Engine installed in aircraft Rogožarski R-313

The Rogozarski R-313 (Рогожарски Р-313 in Serbian) was a two-seat twin-engined monoplane designed as a fighter/light bomber/reconnaissance aircraft in Yugoslavia before World War II. It was designed and built at the Rogozarski factory in Belgrade.

== Design, construction and development ==
The Rogozarski R-313 was a two-seater twin-engined fighter/light bomber/reconnaissance aircraft. It was powered by two in-line Walter Sagitta IIR engines, both fitted with a compressor; each was capable of 493 hp. The elliptical, wooden fuselage was covered in plywood which was also used to 'skin' the round-tipped, trapezoidal wings. The engine nacelles also housed the landing gear. The tail-wheel was, like the main landing gear, retractable. The fuel tank was located in the centre section between the wings. The reconnaissance variant of this aircraft was due to be equipped with a camera, a radio, a fixed 20mm cannon and a single FN 7.9mm machine gun, flexibly mounted. As a light bomber, the plane would carry four 106 kg 'Stankovic' bombs inside the fuselage.

== Operational history ==
This aircraft did not get beyond the prototype stage. However, such characteristics as speed, rate of climb and distance required for take-off compared favourably with contemporary fighters. Only the relative lack of engine power let it down. Adopting the more powerful Daimler-Benz DB 601 or the Rolls-Royce "Merlin" was discussed but came to nothing with the outbreak of war. A total of 25 aircraft were planned, both reconnaissance and light bomber versions.

The prototype became part of 603 training squadron which was located at Grab, near Trebinje during the April war. It was damaged and abandoned attempting to take-off from Grab on 12 April 1941. A month later, the Germans took control and sold the machine to the Croats who had taken over the 'Ikarus' factory. They renamed the aircraft "Nezavisni" ("Independent"); after repairs, a test flight was carried out on 19 May 1942.

Sabotage was then detected, so serious that further repairs could not be carried out. Thus ended the plane which was popular in literature as the "Yugoslav moskito" Although it was designed and built long before its legendary counterpart.

== Operators ==
Kingdom of Yugoslavia

- Royal Yugoslav Air Force 1 aircraft

Independent State of Croatia

- Air Force of the Independent State of Croatia 1 ex-Royal Yugoslav Air Force

== Specifications ==
General characteristics

- Crew: 2
- Length: 11.00 m (36 ft 1 in)
- Wingspan: 13.00 m (42 ft 8 in)
- Height: 2.68 m (8 ft 10 in)
- Wing area: 26.40 m^{2} (284.2 sq ft)
- Empty weight: 2,950 kg (6,504 lb)
- Gross weight: 4,270 kg (9,414 lb)
- Powerplant: 2 × Walter Sagitta inverted air-cooled V-12 piston engines, 368 kW (493 hp) each
- Propellers: 3-bladed

Performance

- Maximum speed: 460 km/h (290 mph, 250 kn) at 4,000 m
- Cruise speed: 376 km/h (234 mph, 203 kn)
- Range: 1,000 km (620 mi, 540 nmi)
- Service ceiling: 8,000 m (26,000 ft)
- Rate of climb: 8.33 m/s (1,640 ft/min)

Armament

- Guns: 1 × 20 mm (0.79 in) HS-404 and 1 × 7.9 mm (0.31 in) FN
- Bombs: 4 × 106 kg (234 lb)

== See also ==
- Sima Milutinović - Aircraft constructor
- Yugoslav Royal Air Force
- Walter Aircraft Engines
- Zmaj R-1
- Ikarus Orkan
- Rogožarski SIM-XIV-H
- Rogožarski PVT
