= Rogožarski SIM-X =

Yugoslav single-engine sports and tourist plane

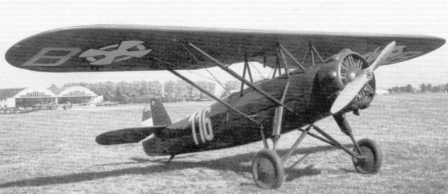

General information
- Type: Sports and tourist and basic military trainer
- National origin: Yugoslavia
- Manufacturer: Prva Srpska Fabrika Aeroplana Živojin Rogožarski A.D.
- Designer: Sima Milutinović
- Status: inactive
- Primary user: Yugoslav Royal Air Force and Yugoslav Aeroclub
- Number built: 21

History
- Manufactured: 1937 to 1941
- Introduction date: 1937
- First flight: 1936
- Retired: 1944
- Developed from: Rogožarski SIM-II i Rogožarski SIM-VIII

The Rogožarski SIM-X (Serbian Cyrillic: Рогожарски СИМ-X) was a Yugoslav single-engine sports and tourist plane also used for basic training of military pilots designed in 1936, with two crew members. It was designed and built at the Rogožarski factory in Belgrade.

== Design and development ==
The SIM-X was designed by Sima Milutinović at the beginning of 1936 drawing on positive experiences of its predecessors SIM-II and SIM-VIII. The prototype was designed in the Rogožarski factory from August to the end of the 1936. The first test flight took place in 1936 when the aircraft was also registered by Rogožarski factory under the code YU-PDY. After detailed test flights had been performed, it was offered to the Yugoslav air force for further tests, which were carried out at the Novi Sad school for pilots. The committee found certain minor flaws but, other than those, it was given an exceptional rating. The SIM-X which was intended for civilian use, sport pilot training, demonstration and tourist flights, was classified by the air force as "a school monoplane, two-seater for the initial training of pilots."

The SIM-X was a single engine, high monoplane parasol wing, with a wooden double-shaft propeller, for two crew members seated in tandem. Although it was envisioned that it would be possible to fit with three different engines: 120 hp Walter NZR, 110 hp Siemens and 120 hp de Havilland Gypsy Major, production aircraft were fitted with the air-cooled radial Walter NZR with a reduction gear. The engines were produced by the S. Vlajković factory Belgrade.

It was mostly of wooden construction, the elliptical cross-section fuselage was entirely made of wood and covered with plywood, and the wings were a wooden structure covered with cloth, with rounded ends. On each side, the wings were supported by a pair of inclined struts which relied on the fuselage. The fuel tank was located in the central part between the wings, that is, at their junction. Landing gear was fixed, no axles, completely made of steel pipe characterized by great strength which enabled the aircraft to land on very rugged terrain.

=== Development of SI-GIP ===
With the introduction of instrument flight training for military pilots in 1939, all Yugoslavian aircraft manufacturers tried to make a school plane for this purpose. Rogozarski thought that it would be best to adapt SIM-X for that purpose. At the same time they wanted to replace the radial Walter engine with the 6 cylinder, in-line, air-cooled 132 hp Gypsy Major which was at the time a very popular engine used in trainers and holiday sports aircraft while the Yugoslav Royal Air Force intended to use it as the basic aircraft engine for their school aircraft. Since Rogožarski was not able to acquire an engine, the factory borrowed it from “Aeroput” company. The prototype complete with all adequate instrumentation was submitted to the army for further testing in 1940, with the aircraft designated SI-GIP Since the aircraft did not meet all the requirements and expectations of the YRAF command, they did not buy the SI-GIP aircraft prototype.

== Variants ==
Rogozarski SIM-X
First variant with 120 hp Walter NZR engines. 21 built - single prototype in 1936, ten in 1937 and 10 in 1938.
Rogozarski SI-GIP
Second variant with 132 hp Gipsy Major engine. Single conversion in 1940.
Rogozarski SIM-Xa
For instrument flight training aircraft with 120 hp Walter NZR engine, single conversion in 1941.

== Operational history ==
The first series of 10 SIM-X aircraft were delivered to the YRAF in 1937. Serial production aircraft were slightly different from the prototype, mainly in the appearance of the NACA cowling. The second series - also of 10 - was ordered in 1938. Initially, the aircraft was used in military pilot schools as a transition aircraft from the Zmaj Fizir FN basic training aircraft to more powerful machines (Zmaj Fizir FP-2 and PVT), and later it was used as the school plane for the initial training of military pilots. Military service of the aircraft began in 1937 when it was first used in pilot schools and later a number of these aircraft was deployed at the training squadrons. The YRAF command assigned three brand new SIM-X aircraft to Aeroclub in 1938. These were used for the training of civil and sport pilots. There were five planes of this type in Aeroclub at the time, however just before the war broke out all SIM-X aircraft were redeployed. The majority of the SIM-X aircraft were destroyed during the 1941 Invasion of Yugoslavia by the Germans and Italians. The German forces captured three aircraft (one in Zemun and two in Lazarevac). The air forces of the Croatian Independent State used one SIM-X until 1943 when it was destroyed by the Srem partisans in emergency landing.

== Operators ==
Kingdom of Yugoslavia

- Royal Yugoslav Air Force 21 aircraft

Croatia

- Air Force of the Independent State of Croatia 1 ex-Royal Yugoslav Air Force

== Specifications ==
Data from Станојевић, Д.; Јанић, Ч; (12/1982.). "Животни пут и дело једног великана нашег ваздухопловства - светао пример и узор нараштајима" (in (Serbian)). Машинство (YU-Београд: Савез инжењера и техничара Југославије) 31: 1867 - 1876.

General characteristics

- Crew: 2
- Length: 6.96 m (22 ft 10 in)
- Wingspan: 10.00 m (32 ft 10 in)
- Height: 2.70 m (8 ft 10 in)
- Wing area: 18.50 m^{2} (199.1 sq ft)
- Empty weight: 543 kg (1,197 lb)
- Gross weight: 785 kg (1,731 lb)
- Powerplant: 1 × Walter NZR 6-cylinder radial, 89 kW (120 hp)
- Propellers: 2-bladed

Performance

- Maximum speed: 202 km/h (126 mph, 109 kn)
- Cruise speed: 168 km/h (104 mph, 91 kn)
- Minimum control speed: 72 km/h (45 mph, 39 kn)
- Range: 560 km (350 mi, 300 nmi)
- Service ceiling: 5,500 m (18,000 ft)
- Rate of climb: 4.17 m/s (821 ft/min)

== See also ==
- Rogožarski AZR
- SIM-VIII
- Rogožarski SIM-XII-H
- Rogožarski PVT
- Rogožarski R-100
- Siemens-Halske Sh 14
