= SIM-II =

Yugoslav Sports and tourist plane

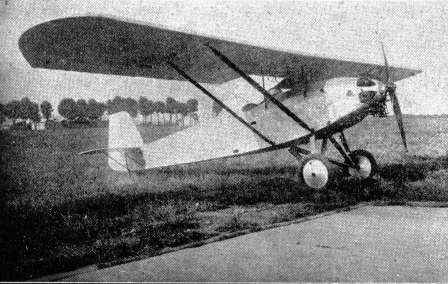

General information
- Type: Sports and tourist plane and the plane for the basic training
- National origin: Yugoslavia
- Manufacturer: S.Vlajković i sinovi, Belgrade
- Designer: Sima Milutinović
- Status: inactive
- Primary user: YU-Aeroclub
- Number built: 1

History
- Introduction date: prototype
- First flight: 29.05.1930
- Retired: 1937

The SIM-II (Serbian: СИМ-II) was a 1930s Yugoslav Sports and tourist plane and the plane for the basic training, one-engined, with two crew members. It was designed by Sima Milutinović and built at the "S.Vlajković i sinovi" factory in Belgrade.

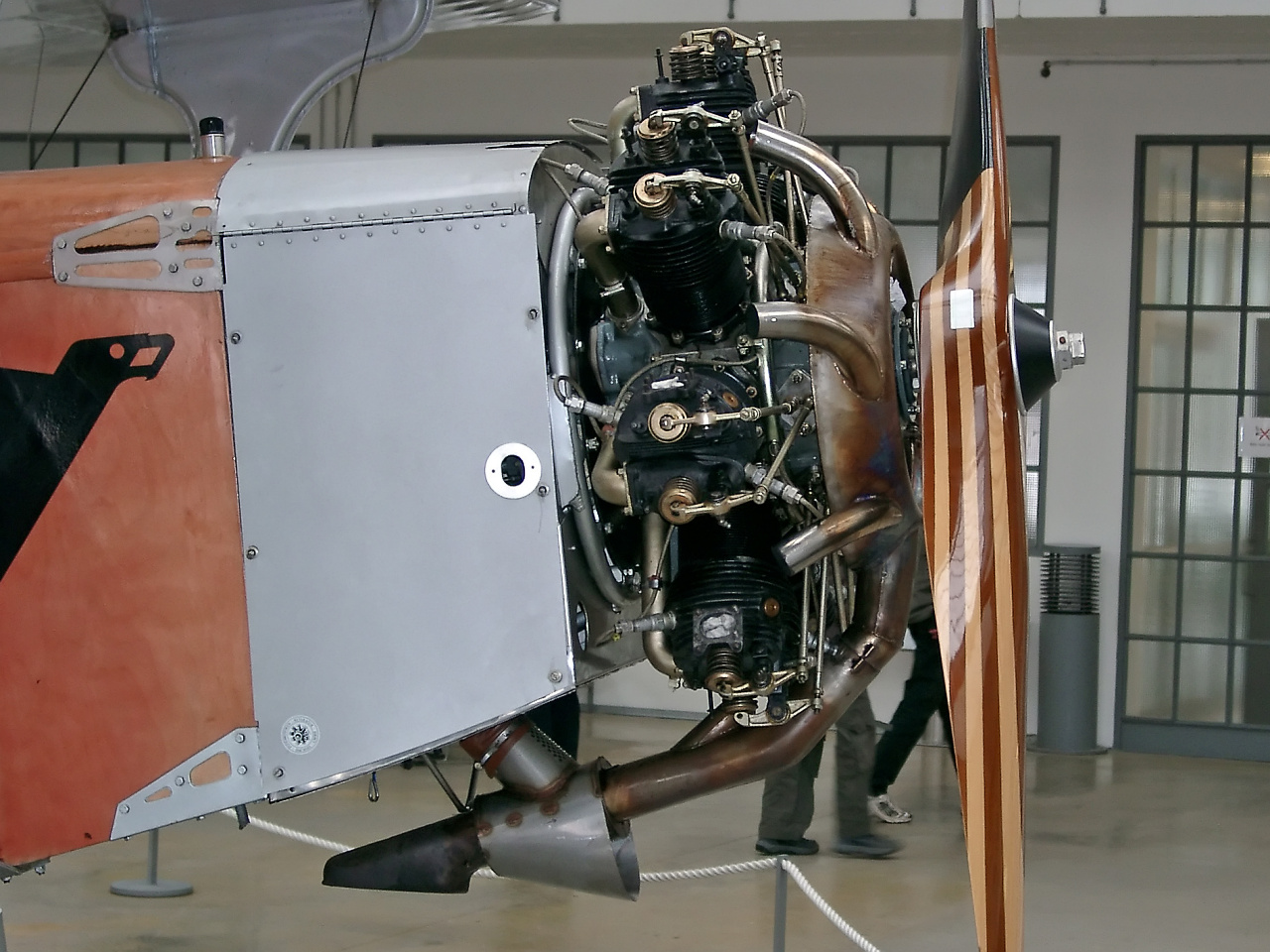
The Siemens Sh 14 engine installation in a SIM-II

== Design and development ==
Aircraft SIM-II was the first independent project of the most prolific designer of the Yugoslav aircraft, engineerSima Milutinović. Project of the school aircraft started Sima Milutinović during his specialization in the French aviation factories in late 1920s, where it attracted a solution that saw the flight school Blerio to the student and teacher sit on the plane next to each other. Upon his return to Yugoslavia, is hard at work, and aircraft that made the project was named SIM-II. Design was started at the end of the 1929 and the beginning of 1930. The prototype was developed in the aircraft factory in Belgrade "S. Vlajković and Sons", directed by the private constructor and with the financial help of his brother while the motor Siemens Sh-14 100 hp purchased on credit. The first test flight took place on 29 May 1930, and conducted by the test pilot Dragisa Stanisavljević, students techniques and reserve military pilot. Following successful factory testing, the commission commands YRAF tests carried out from the Pilot School in Novi Sad. The aircraft was rejected for military service because of lack of robustness and parallel to the seat of a military flight teachers are not used, so for the time entirely new conception of school aircraft collapsed .

Aircraft was high monoplane (parasol wing) with a Siemens engine 100 hp, with two crew members who were sitting side by side (pilot and instructor). The plane was completely wooden fuselage is covered with plywood, and the wings are covered with canvas. The wings are large profiles with rounded ends. On each side, the wings are supported by a pair of inclined struts which relied on the fuselage. The fuel tank was located in the central part between the wings that is, at their junction. Landing gear was fixed with elastic legs and depreciation is carried out using rubber blocks.

== Operational history ==
While the plane was not accepted for military service command YRAF bought and gave him a prototype flight school of the Association of Reserve airmen. The plane was used for several years training reserve pilots in Zemun. During military service, the SIM-II is often borrowed Central Administration Aero Club, which used him for propaganda flights and was the beginning of the 1935 The military authorities handed over the use of Aeroclub. The aircraft was registered civil markings YU-PCV, and flew until 1937. when it was withdrawn from use.

== Operators ==
Kingdom of Yugoslavia

- Yugoslav Aerocub 1 aircraft
- Yugoslav Royal Air Force

== Specifications ==
Data from Станојевић, Д.; Јанић, Ч; (12/1982.). "Животни пут и дело једног великана нашег ваздухопловства - светао пример и узор нараштајима" (in (Serbian)). Машинство (-{YU}--Београд: Савез инжењера и техничара Југославије) 31: 1867 - 1876.

General characteristics

- Crew: 2
- Length: 7.80 m (25 ft 7 in)
- Wingspan: 12.40 m (40 ft 8 in)
- Height: 2.68 m (8 ft 10 in)
- Wing area: 21.70 m^{2} (233.6 sq ft)
- Empty weight: 520 kg (1,146 lb)
- Gross weight: 770 kg (1,698 lb)
- Powerplant: 1 × Simens Sh 14 7-cylinder radial, 82 kW (110 hp)
- Propellers: 2-bladed

Performance

- Maximum speed: 105 km/h (65 mph, 57 kn) 148 km/h at sea level
- Range: 750 km (470 mi, 400 nmi)
- Service ceiling: 5,000 m (16,000 ft)

== See also ==
- Yugoslav Royal Air Force
- Siemens-Halske Sh 14
- Rogožarski AZR
- SIM-VIII
- Rogožarski SIM-XII-H
- Rogožarski PVT
- Rogožarski R-100
- Sima Milutinović
