= Rogožarski Brucoš =

Monoplane aircraft designed as a trainer in Yugoslavia

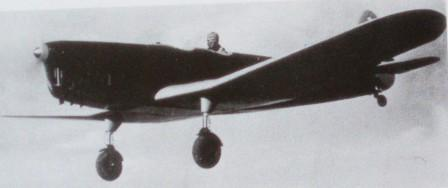
- Rogožarski Brucoš

General information
- Type: Trainer
- National origin: Yugoslavia
- Manufacturer: Prva Srpska Fabrika Aeroplana Živojin Rogožarski, Belgrade
- Designer: Miroslav Nenadović and Milenko Mitrović-Spirta
- Primary user: Yugoslav Royal Air Force
- Number built: 1

History
- First flight: 1940
- Retired: 1941

Rogožarski Brucoš (Serbian Cyrillic:Рогожарски Бруцош) was a single-engine, two-seat, low wing monoplane aircraft designed as a trainer in Yugoslavia before World War II. It was designed and built in the Rogožarski aircraft factory in Belgrade.

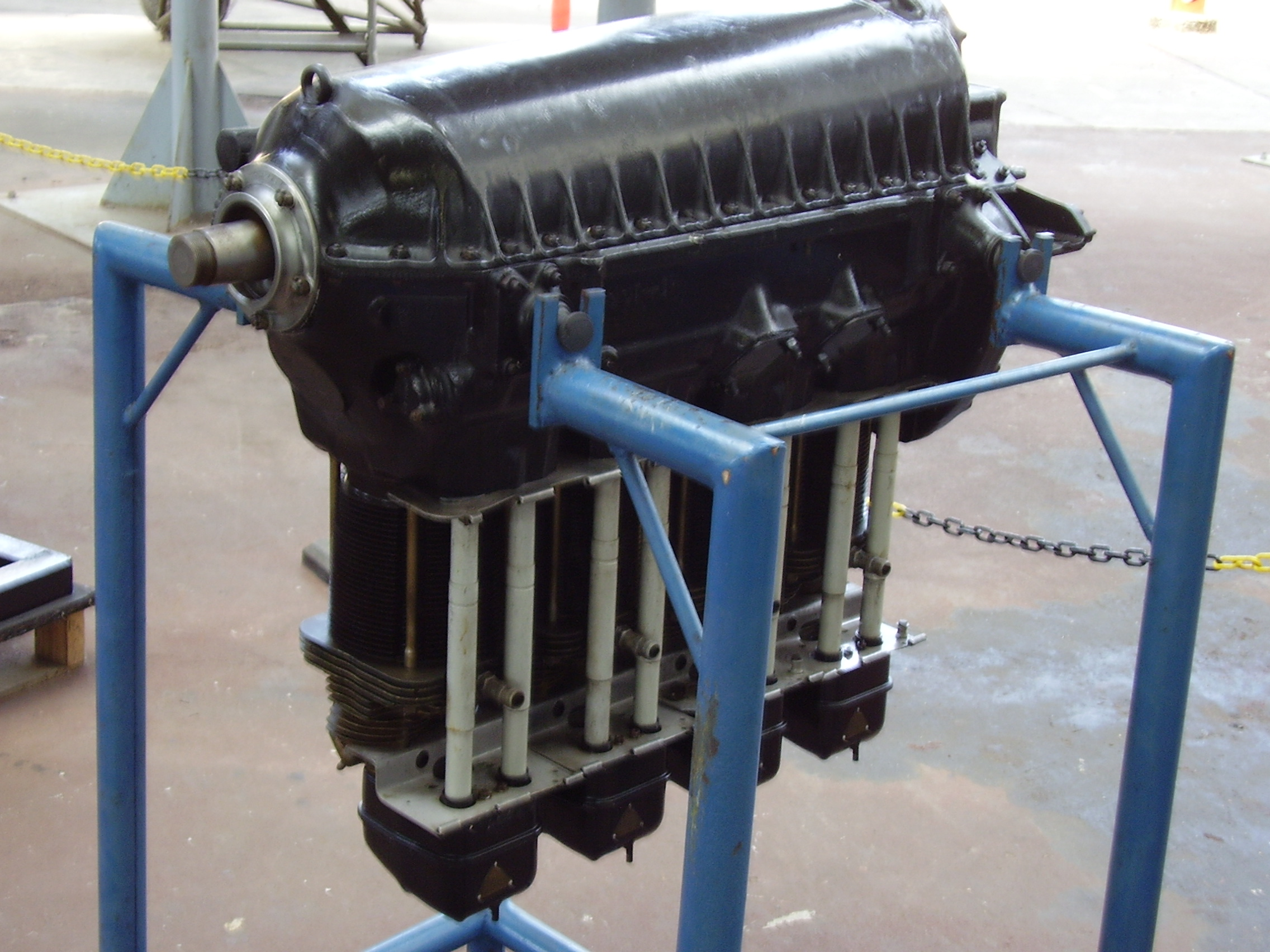
de Havilland Gipsy Major engine

== Design and development ==
In order to replace its obsolete pilot training aircraft, the Zmaj Fizir FN biplane, the Yugoslav Royal Air Force (YRAF) Command held a competition in mid-1936 to develop a new aircraft for training pilots. The new aircraft was to be a low wing aircraft so that Yugoslavian pilots could get accustomed to piloting the fighters that the Yugoslav Royal Air Force was using, the Hawker Hurricane, Messerschmitt Bf 109 and the Rogožarski IK-3.

The Rogožarski Factory decided to participate in the competition and engaged two well-known aerospace engineers, Miroslav Nenadović and Mitrović Milenko-Spirta, who began working on the design. Building of the prototype started the same year, and it flew for the first time in May 1940. It was handed over to the YRAF for examination, and aircraft functionality.

== Operational history ==
During the testing done in the aircraft repair plant all deficiencies observed were remedied and the plane was able to fly again before October 1940. Simultaneously with the repairs the wings underwent reconstruction so they could enter into reverse - this was the first Yugoslav aircraft with folding wings. Unfortunately, the Commission had already given an unfavorable opinion on the Brucoš. Factory Rogožarski objected to this view, and formed a new commission to re-examine all the additional aircraft that participated in the contest. The second Commission declared the Ikarus Aero 2 aircraft as the best.

Desiring, however, to sell his plane, and in cooperation with Royal Yugoslav Navy aviation, the factory re-designed the Rogožarski "Brucoš" as a floatplane with a 140 kW Walter Six engine and floats from the Canadian Edo Aircraft Corporation. This aircraft was offered to the Navy command as a floatplane for basic training.

At the beginning of April, the single Brucoš was in the hangar of the Experiment Aero Group at Zemun airport, only to be flown on 10 April 1941 to the war airfield in Veliki Radinci where the first fighter brigade had been relocated. The Brucoš is believed to have been burnt with other aircraft to keep them from falling into enemy hands.

== Operators ==
Kingdom of Yugoslavia

- Royal Yugoslav Air Force 1 aircraft

== Specifications ==
Data from Janić, Čedomir. "Rogožarski "Brucoš""

General characteristics

- Crew: 2
- Length: 8.10 m (26 ft 7 in)
- Wingspan: 10.00 m (32 ft 10 in)
- Height: 3.10 m (10 ft 2 in)
- Wing area: 16.00 m^{2} (172.2 sq ft)
- Empty weight: 615 kg (1,356 lb)
- Gross weight: 872 kg (1,922 lb)
- Powerplant: 1 × de Havilland Gipsy Major I four-cylinder inline piston engine, 96 kW (130 hp)
- Propellers: 2-bladed

Performance

- Maximum speed: 185 km/h (115 mph, 100 kn) 210 km/h at sea level
- Range: 840 km (520 mi, 450 nmi)
- Service ceiling: 4,000 m (13,000 ft)
- Rate of climb: 2.54 m/s (500 ft/min)

== See also ==
- Zmaj Fizir FN
- SIM-VIII
- Rogožarski SIM-VI
- Rogozarski R-100
