= Rogožarski SIM-VI =

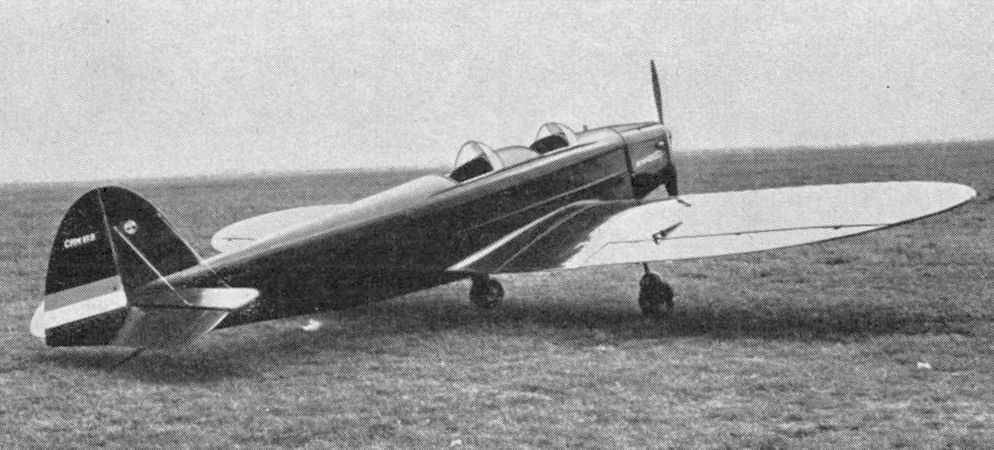
- Trainer aircraft Rogožarski SIM VIa

General information
- Type: Trainer aircraft
- National origin: Yugoslav
- Manufacturer: Prva Srpska Fabrika Aeroplana Živojin Rogožarski, Belgrade
- Designer: Sima Milutinović
- Status: inactive
- Primary user: Yugoslav Aero Club
- Number built: 2

History
- First flight: 1937
- Retired: 1941

The Rogožarski SIM-VI (Serbian Cyrillic:Рогожарски СИМ-VI) was a single-engined, two-seat, low wing aircraft designed as trainer in Yugoslav before World War II. It was designed and built at the Rogožarski factory in Belgrade.

== Design and development ==
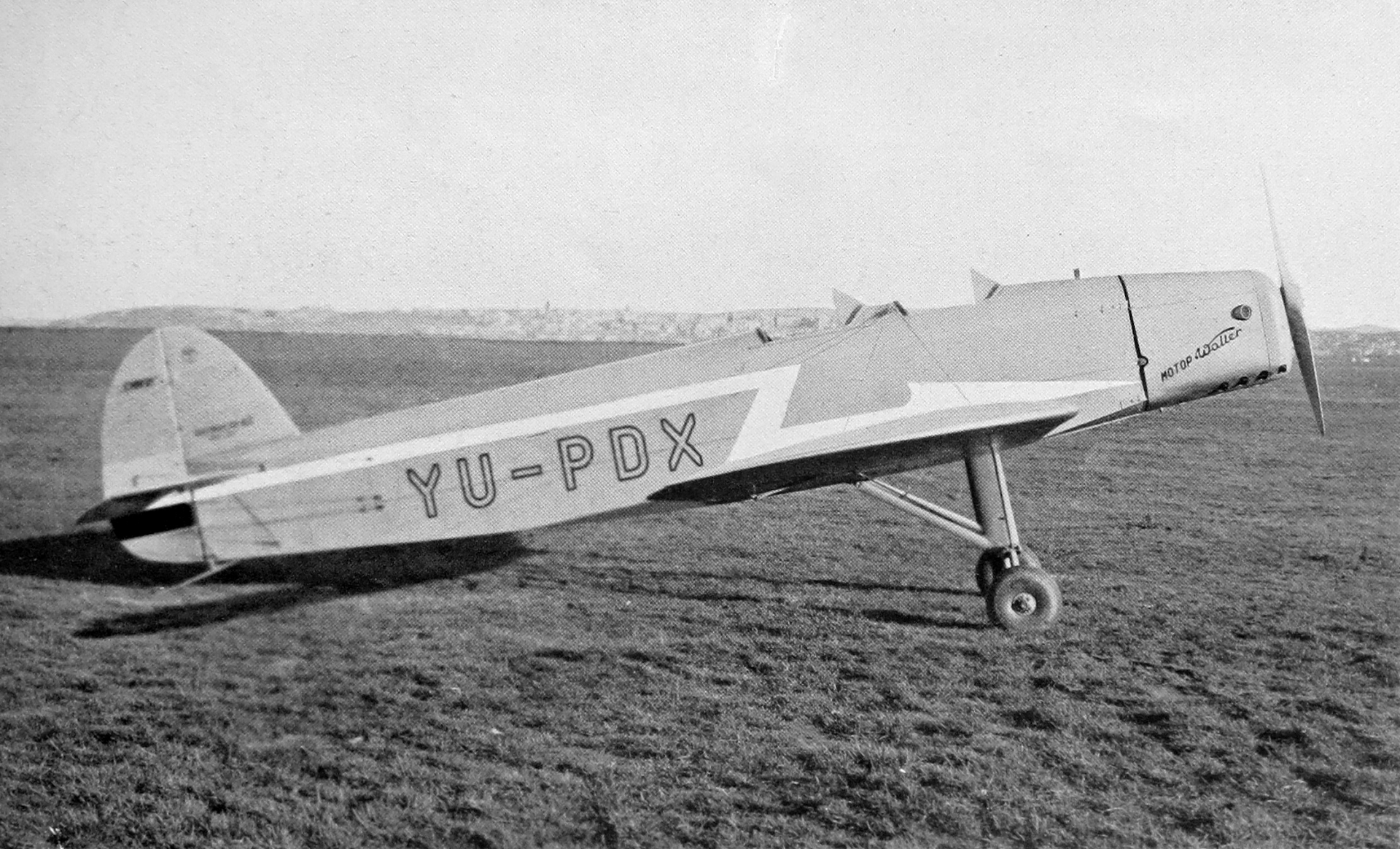
Walter Mikron and Rogažarski SIM-VI (1937)

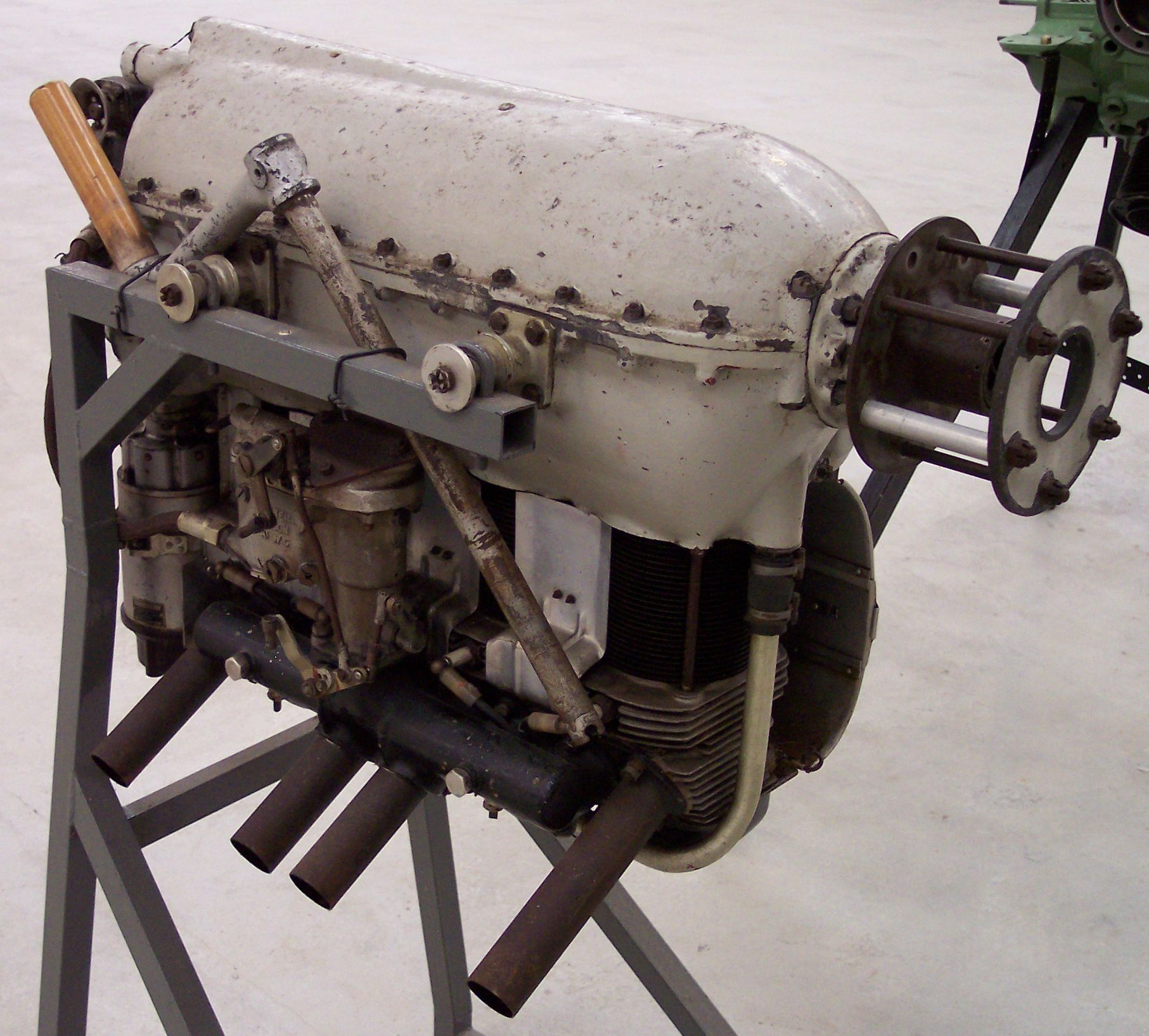
A Walter Mikron III engine similar to that powering the Rogozarski SIM-VI

The SIM-VI was designed by engineer Sima Milutinović in the early 1930s as an inexpensive trainer plane that would enable expansion of sports aviation. The project was in suspension until 1936, when a prototype was constructed, and the maiden flight was made in 1937. The aircraft was a low wing monoplane of fabric-covered wooden structure. A four-cylinder 50 hp Walter Mikron engine drove a two-bladed wooden propeller. The plane had tandem seating and was intended for civilian use, for the training of sports pilots, demonstration flights and travel. The wings were of thin profile, only 6% of trapezoidal shape with rounded ends. On each side, the wings were stretched with molded wire ties.

== Variants ==
- Rogozarski SIM-VI – with 37 kW Walter Mikron engine
- Rogozarski SIM-VI-a – with 44 kW Walter Mikron II engine

Immediately after completing the flight tests of aircraft SIM-VI, engineer Milutinovic undertook the repair of the shortcomings he had observed, so that by the end of the 1937 Rogozarski had a new variant of this airplane which was designated SIM-VI-a. It had a more powerful engine Walter Mikron II 44 kW (60 hp). An increase in engine power required strengthening of the basic structure which Milutinovic used to make general improvements to the aircraft. Wing relative thickness was increased from 6% to 15% which strengthened the wings, and resulting in the removal of wire ties. Now the wings were covered with cardboard to the half swing instead of cloth which resulted in an improved overall stiffness of the aircraft. This also enabled the landing gear and aerodynamic characteristics of new aircraft to be upgraded, while the weight was only slightly increased.

== Operational history ==
After successful testing and registration (YU-PDX) the SIM-VI was bought by the Central Administration of the Aero Club, which used the it at airshows and for the training of sport pilots. The aircraft did not enter serial production because it could not be used at smaller and under-equipped airports that existed in central Serbia.

Flight tests that were carried out at the Zemun airfield proved that the SIM-VI-a had slightly better performance than its predecessor, and was able to perform basic stunts. After being granted a navigation license the plane was registered under civil designation YU-PEZ and it was bought by Aero Club's Central Administration. The plane was used until the beginning of the war in 1941 at air shows, sports competitions and for pilot training. Pilot and engineer Arsenijevic, piloted this plane at the competition Little Entente states in 1938. during the competition the plane flew some 3,274 km (2,034.37 miles) achieving an average speed of 151.01 km/h (93.83 mph). Pilots who flew the plane felt that the plane was agile and easy to operate and fly, but despite good features and relatively low cost, SIM-VI did not go into serial production it could not win over the traditional empirical approach (a robust and powerful aircraft is a good aircraft). Right before the outbreak of war, the aircraft was included into the Yugoslav Royal Air Force, deployed as a signalling plane but was destroyed during the bombing of Lazarevac airfield on 7 April 1941.

== Operators ==
Kingdom of Yugoslavia

- Aero Club 2 aircraft
- Yugoslav Royal Air Force – One aircraft was impressed into military service in April 1940.

== Specifications ==
General characteristics

- Crew: 2
- Length: 7.05 m (23 ft 2 in)
- Wingspan: 9.50 m (31 ft 2 in)
- Wing area: 15.00 m^{2} (161.5 sq ft)
- Empty weight: 300 kg (661 lb)
- Gross weight: 500 kg (1,102 lb)
- Powerplant: 1 × Walter Mikron, 4-cylinder in-line piston engine, 37 kW (50 hp)
- Propellers: 2-bladed

Performance

- Maximum speed: 120 km/h (75 mph, 65 kn) 150 km/h (93 mph) at sea level
- Cruise speed: 60 km/h (37 mph, 32 kn)
- Range: 450 km (280 mi, 240 nmi)
- Service ceiling: 4,000 m (13,000 ft)

== See also ==
- Rogožarski AZR
- Rogožarski Brucoš
- Rogožarski SIM-VIII
- Royal Yugoslav Air Force
- Sima Milutinović
