= Walter Castor =

1920s Czech piston aircraft engine

Castor
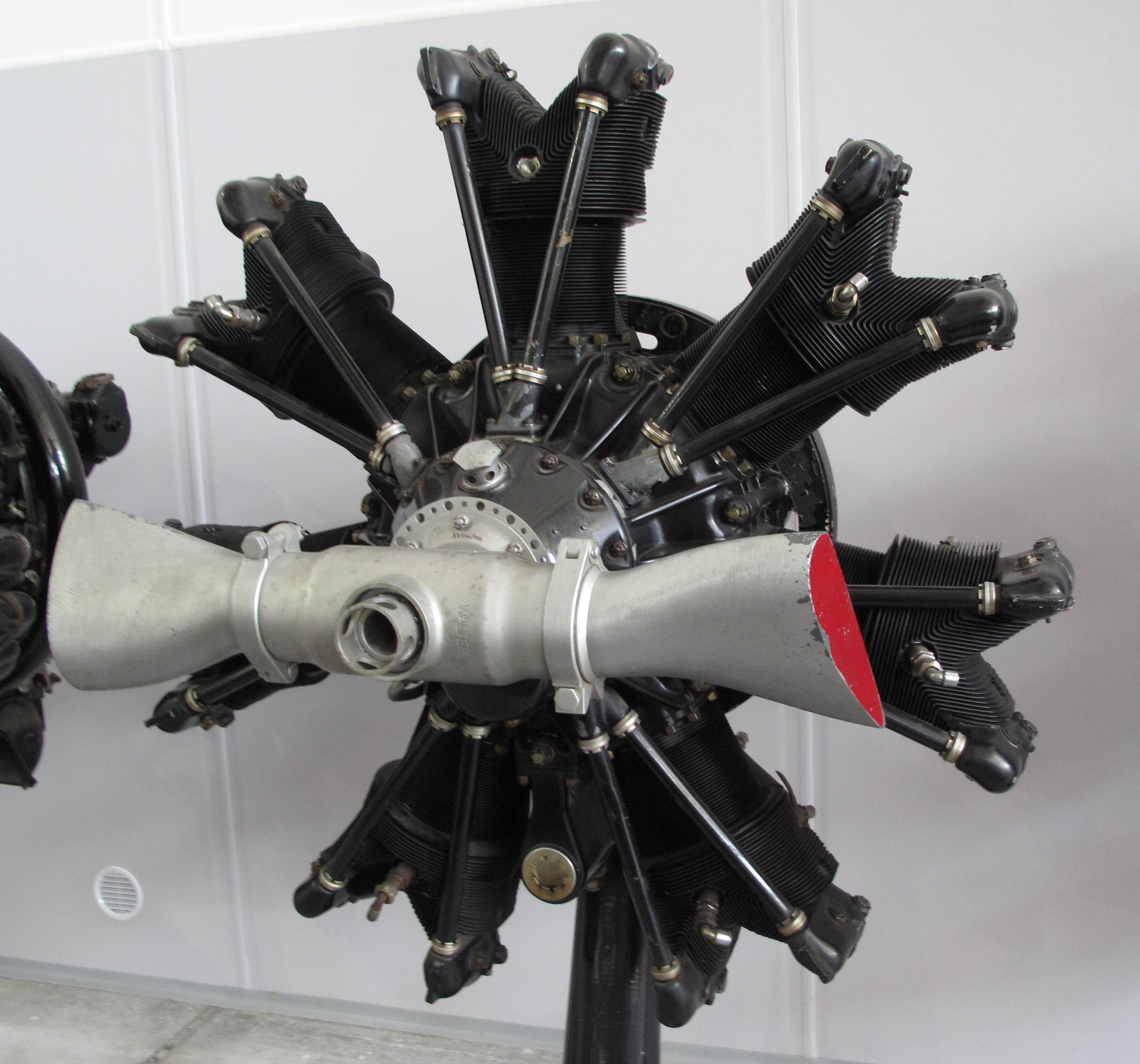
- Walter Castor III
- Type: Radial aero engine
- National origin: Czechoslovakia
- Manufacturer: Walter Aircraft Engines
- First run: 1929

The Walter Castor was a Czechoslovak seven-cylinder, air-cooled radial engine for powering aircraft that was developed in the late 1920s. The Super Castor was a nine-cylinder development. Castor I production began in 1928, Castor II in 1932 and the Castor III in 1934.

== Applications ==
- Aero A.35
- Aero A.304 (Super Castor)
- Airspeed Envoy
- Breda Ba.25
- Dornier Do K
- Fizir F1V
- Hopfner HV-6/28
- Letov Š-28
- Rogozarski AZR
- Savoia-Marchetti S.71

== Engines on display ==
A preserved example of the Walter Castor engine is on display at the following museum:

- Prague Aviation Museum, Kbely

== Specifications (Castor I) ==
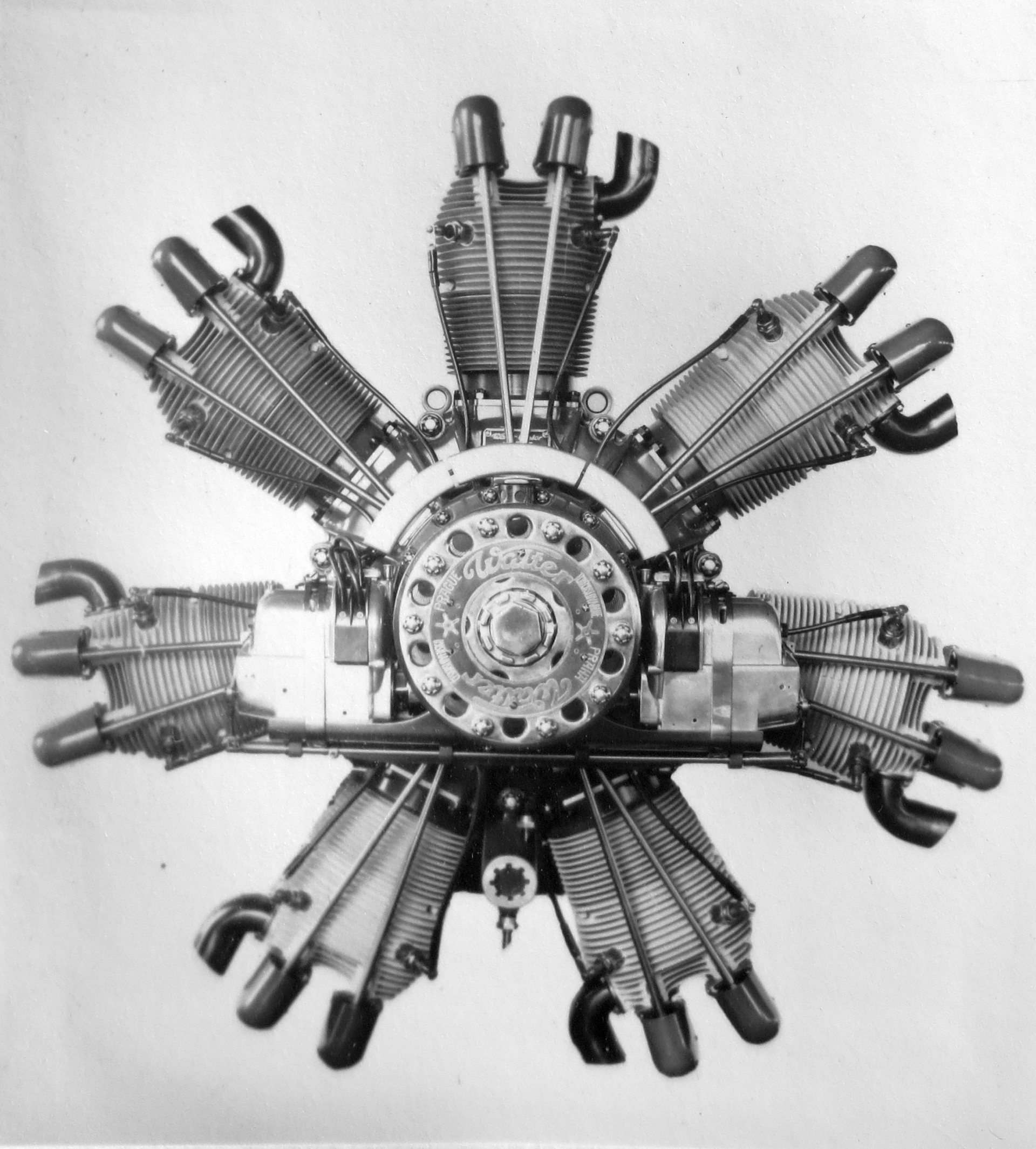
Walter Castor I (1928)

Data from Flight., L'Air 1 December 1929: Les Moteurs Walter

=== General characteristics ===
- Type: 7-cylinder radial piston engine
- Bore: 135 mm (5.31 in)
- Stroke: 170 mm (6.69 in)
- Displacement: 17.033 L (1,039.4 cu in)
- Dry weight: 248 kg (547 lb)

=== Components ===
- Valvetrain: One intake and one exhaust valve per cylinder
- Fuel system: Zenith carburettor
- Fuel type: 50% Petrol, 50% Benzol
- Cooling system: Air-cooled

=== Performance ===
- Power output: 180 kW (240 hp) at 1,750 rpm normal
- Compression ratio: 6:1
- Specific fuel consumption: 0.302 kg/kWh (0.496 lb/(hp⋅h)) at 0.8 - 0.81 specific gravity
- Oil consumption: 0.027 kg/kWh (0.044 lb/(hp⋅h))
- Power-to-weight ratio: 0.78 kW/kg (0.48 hp/lb)

== See also ==
Comparable engines

- Armstrong Siddeley Lynx

Related lists

- List of aircraft engines
