= Rogožarski SIM-VIII =

1931 Yugoslav sport, tourist and training aircraft

SIM-VIII

General information
- Type: Sports and tourist plane and the plane for the basic training
- National origin: Kingdom of Yugoslavia
- Manufacturer: Prva Srpska Fabrika Aeroplana Živojin Rogožarski AD (Rogožarski); Ikarus-Zemun (Ikarus)
- Designer: Sima Milutinović
- Primary users: Yugoslav Royal Air Force YU-Aeroclub
- Number built: 5 (3 at Rogožarski, 2 at Ikarus)

History
- Manufactured: from 1931 to 1933
- Introduction date: 1931
- First flight: 1931
- Retired: 1941
- Developed from: Rogožarski SIM-II

The SIM-VIII (Serbian Cyrillic:СИМ-VIII) was a 1931 Yugoslav, single-engined, 2-seat, sport, tourist and training aircraft, designed by Sima Milutinović and built at the Rogožarski factory in Belgrade from 1931 and by Ikarus at Zemun from 1933.

== Design and development ==
The SIM-VIII was designed by Sima Milutinović at the end of 1930, with a desire to contribute to the development of aviation in Yugoslavia. The prototype was built at the expense of the constructor and the first test flight was conducted at Zemun in the autumn of 1931. After certification the aircraft was purchased by the Yugoslav Royal Air Force and the Yugoslav Aeroclub at Belgrade.

The SIM-VIII was a parasol winged monoplane powered by an 82 kW (110 hp) Siemens-Halske Sh 14 engine driving a wooden 2-bladed propeller, seating two crew members in tandem open cockpits. Construction of the SIM-VIII employs several new construction solutions designed to reduce cost and streamline production, without compromising aircraft flight characteristics, built mostly of wooden construction with steel fittings at high stress areas. The fuselage is entirely made of wood covered with plywood, and the wings have supporting structure made of wood covered with fabric. On each side, the wings are supported by a pair of inclined struts attached to the lower fuselage longerons, and the fuel tank is also located in the centre fuselage. The control surfaces are made of welded steel tube, covered with fabric and the fixed V-strutted landing gear was built up from high strength steel tube enabling the SIM-VIII to handle rough landing strips.

== Operational history ==
Three SIM-VIIIs were produced by Rogožarski 1931, owned by the Yugoslav Aerocub at Belgrade, (registered YU-PBC, YU-PBD and YU-PCI) which used them for propaganda flights and training sport pilots. The first of the listed aircraft flew until 1937, when it was withdrawn from use and the other two have no recorded history.

The two aircraft built in the Ikarus factory at Zemun in 1933 were not placed on the civil registry and are most likely to have been produced for the Yugoslav Royal Air Force.

Accolades awarded to the SIM-VIII include 1st place at the 1932 International Air Rally (Rundflug), held from 19 July 1932 at Warsaw.

== Operators ==
Kingdom of Yugoslavia

- Royal Yugoslav Air Force - 2 aircraft
- Yugoslav Aerocub - 3 aircraft

== Specifications ==
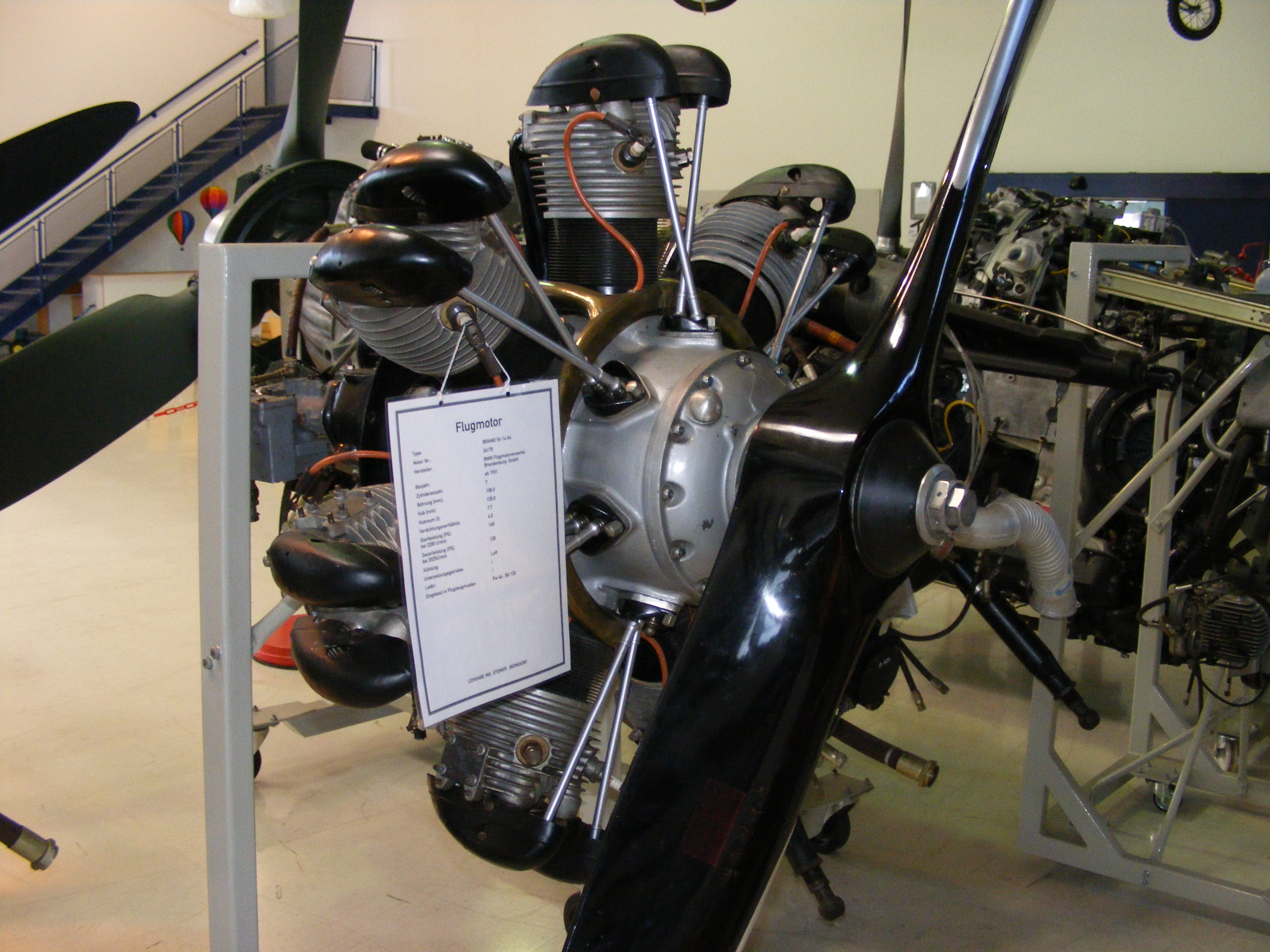
A Siemens-Halske Sh 14 engine powered the SIM-VIII

Data from

General characteristics

- Crew: 1
- Length: 6.60 m (21 ft 8 in)
- Wingspan: 9.80 m (32 ft 2 in)
- Height: 2.54 m (8 ft 4 in)
- Wing area: 15.40 m^{2} (165.8 sq ft)
- Empty weight: 445 kg (981 lb)
- Gross weight: 675 kg (1,488 lb)
- Powerplant: 1 × Siemens-Halske Sh 14 7-cylinder air-cooled radial piston engine, 82 kW (110 hp)
- Propellers: 2-bladed

Performance

- Maximum speed: 173 km/h (107 mph, 93 kn)
- Range: 450 km (280 mi, 240 nmi)
- Service ceiling: 5,000 m (16,000 ft)
- Rate of climb: 4.16 m/s (819 ft/min)

== See also ==
- Yugoslav Royal Air Force
- Siemens-Halske Sh 14
- SIM-II
- Rogožarski AZR
- Rogožarski SIM-X
- Rogožarski SIM-XII-H
- Rogožarski PVT
- Rogožarski R-100
- Sima Milutinović
