= Albatros L 82 =

1920s German trainer biplane

L 82
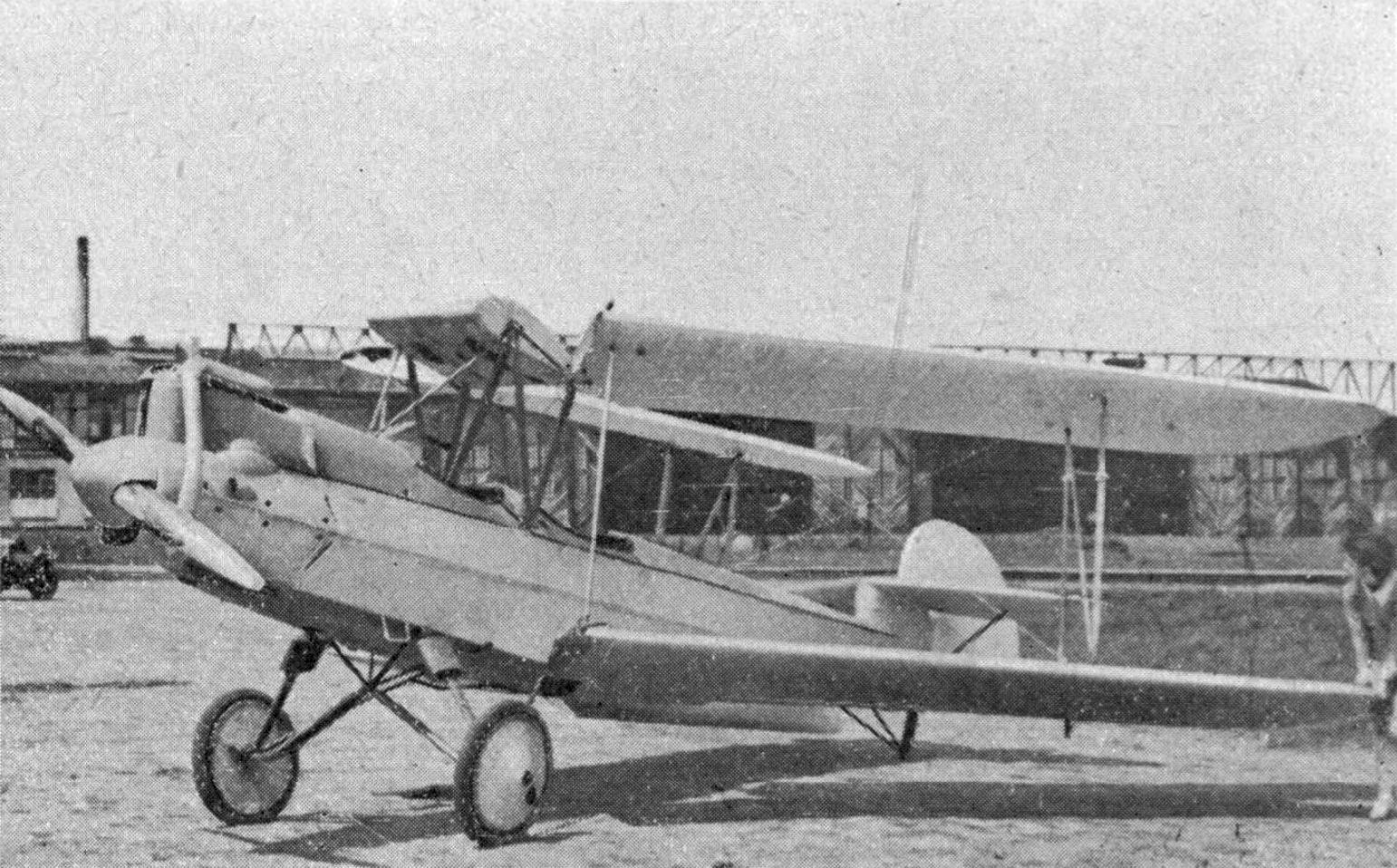
- Albatros L 82 with wings folded

General information
- Type: Trainer
- Manufacturer: Albatros Flugzeugwerke
- Primary user: Germany
- Number built: 17

History
- First flight: 1929

The Albatros L 82 was a 1920s German trainer biplane. Of conventional configuration, it seated the pilot and instructor in separate, open cockpits. The wings were single-bay, equal-span, and unstaggered.

== Operational history ==
The prototype and one production L 82b took part in the Challenge 1929 international contest, during which the prototype (D-1704) crashed on 10 August 1929 in Turnu Severin, pilot Karl Ziegler. The second example (D-1706) completed the contest in 27th place, pilot Werner Junck).

== Variants ==
- L 82a - prototype with de Havilland Gipsy engine
- L 82b - single example with Siemens-Halske Sh 13 engine
- L 82c - production version with Siemens-Halske Sh 14 engine

== Specifications (L 82c) ==
General characteristics

- Crew: two, pilot and instructor
- Length: 7.41 m (24 ft 4 in)
- Wingspan: 9.00 m (29 ft 6 in)
- Height: 2.66 m (8 ft 9 in)
- Wing area: 20.0 m^{2} (215 sq ft)
- Empty weight: 400 kg (880 lb)
- Gross weight: 750 kg (1,650 lb)
- Powerplant: 1 × Siemens-Halske Sh 14 , 120 kW (160 hp)

Performance

- Maximum speed: 160 km/h (100 mph, 87 kn)
- Range: 560 km (350 mi, 300 nmi)
- Service ceiling: 3,800 m (12,500 ft)

== Bibliography ==
- Taylor, Michael J. H. (1989). Jane's Encyclopedia of Aviation. London: Studio Editions. p. 56.
