= Rogožarski SIM-XIV-H =

Yugoslav coastal reconnaissance floatplane and light bomber

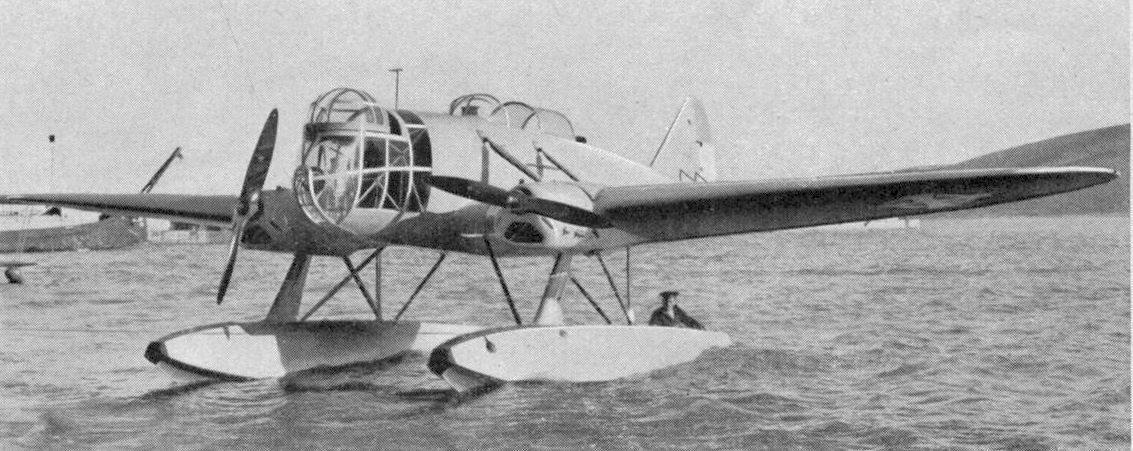

General information
- Type: Reconnaissance floatplane
- National origin: Yugoslavia
- Manufacturer: Prva Srpska Fabrika Aeroplana Zivojin Rogožarski A.D.,
- Designer: Sima Milutinović
- Status: inactive
- Primary user: Yugoslav Royal Navy
- Number built: 19

History
- Manufactured: from 1939 to 1941
- Introduction date: 1939
- First flight: 8 February 1938
- Retired: 1942

The Rogožarski SIM-XIV-H (Serbian: Рогожарски СИМ-XIV-Х) was a 1930s Yugoslav coastal reconnaissance floatplane and light bomber, twin-engine, with three crew members. It was designed and built at the Rogožarski factory in Belgrade. The type saw action during the Invasion of Yugoslavia and in the North African campaign.

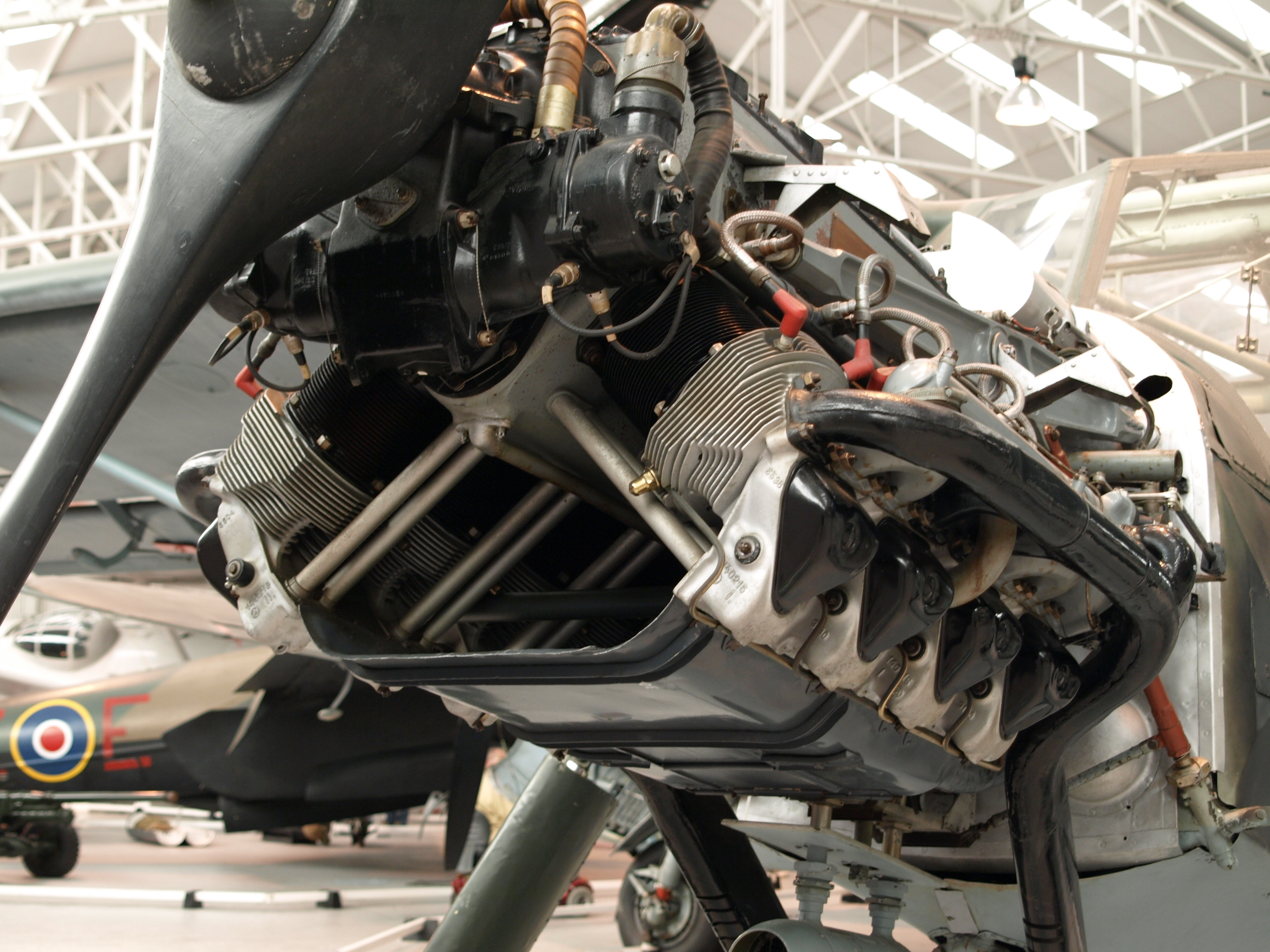
Argus As10 engine installed in Seaplanes Rogozarski SIM-XIV-H

== Design and development ==
In January 1937, the Yugoslav Navy Air Service issued a specification for a twin-engine coastal reconnaissance aircraft, to replace the Ikarus IO flying boat.

To meet this requirement, Rogozarski proposed the SIM-XIV-H, a twin-engine floatplane designed by Sima Milutinović, and this type was selected by the Yugoslav navy, with the first prototype making its maiden flight on 8 February 1938.

The SIM-XIV-H was a low winged monoplane of mixed wood and metal construction, with an oval section monocoque fuselage. The wing was braced to the fuselage by steel-tube struts, with the tail also braced. It had a glazed nose, with a gun turret armed with a single machine gun mounted above the nose. The pilot and radio operator/gunner sat in tandem under a long canopy, with the observer also armed with a single machine gun. The rear fuselage was fabric covered, while the moving tail surfaces were metal clad. The elliptical wing was of wooden construction and was clad in plywood. It was powered by two 240 hp (179 kW) Argus As 10C air-cooled V8 engines driving fixed two-bladed propellers, also designed by engineer Sima Milutinović. Two Alclad floats made by the EDO Corporation were attached to the engine nacelles and fuselage.

The basic aircraft weapons were anti-submarine bombs, of which the plane could carry one 100 kg bomb or two 50 kg. For anti-personnel action the plane could carry 12 fragmentation bombs massing 12 kg each. Typically, the aircraft was armed with two machine guns on board: one placed in the nose to by operated by the observer and the other in the rear gunner's cockpit. Bombsights were made in Yugoslavia and the bombing of Viro in low flight also Brilet local sights.

Testing of the prototype was successful, with the aircraft demonstrating good handling, and the type was ordered into production. The first batch of six SIM-XIV-H, known as the Series O, differed from the prototype in having the turret removed from the nose and the tail modified. The second batch of six aircraft, the Series 1, had a cantilever wing, eliminating the bracing between the wing and the fuselage, and had 270 hp (201 kW) Argus As-10 engines driving metal two-pitch propellers.

A third batch of 12 aircraft was ordered in 1940, with 450 hp (336 kW) Argus As 410, but construction was interrupted by the German invasion of Yugoslavia in 1941. Plans for a landplane trainer adaptation of the SIM-XIV-H were also abandoned.

== Operational history ==
All the SIM-XIV-H and SIM XIVB-Hs were deployed to the naval bases at Divulje (near Split) and Kumbor (Kotor). Before Yugoslavia entered the war, they were used to carry out the duties for which they were designed, with intense training activity due to the approaching threat of war. In that period, three aircraft were destroyed, with 16 aircraft remaining in service when the Germans invaded Yugoslavia.

These aircraft were used in the April war in operations against the Germans and Italians along the Adriatic coast, carrying out reconnaissance and aiding mining operations. Five aircraft were destroyed in the fight against the attacking forces. Four aircraft attempted to escape to Greece, of which two were destroyed and two reached British bases in Egypt via Crete. These two aircraft were used for reconnaissance missions over the Mediterranean Sea as part of the Yugoslav-manned No. 2 Yugoslav (floatplane) Squadron of the No. 230 Squadron RAF, until one was lost and the other scrapped because of lack of spares. Italy seized a total of eight aircraft, a SIM-XIV-H and 7 SIM-XIVB-Hs. One specimen was immediately transferred to the Test Center at Vigna di Valle, where it showed better results than found in testing in Yugoslavia while the others were transferred to the aeronautical school at Orbetello, continuing in use for training and communications purposes until the end of 1942.

== Operators ==
Kingdom of Yugoslavia

- Royal Yugoslav Navy - 19 aircraft

Italy

- Regia Aeronautica - 8 aircraft

United Kingdom

- Royal Air Force - 2 aircraft

== Variants ==
Rogožarski SIM-XIV-H
First variant with two Argus As-10C engines 240 hp, six built in 1939
Rogožarski SIM-XIVB-H
Second variant with two Argus As-10E engines 270 hp, 12 built in 1940.

== Specifications ==
Data from Станојевић, Д.; Јанић, Ч; (12/1982.). "Животни пут и дело једног великана нашег ваздухопловства - светао пример и узор нараштајима" (in (Serbian)). Машинство (-{YU}--Београд: Савез инжењера и техничара Југославије) 31: 1867 - 1876.

General characteristics

- Crew: 3
- Length: 11.20 m (36 ft 9 in)
- Wingspan: 15.20 m (49 ft 10 in)
- Height: 4.48 m (14 ft 8 in)
- Wing area: 37.56 m^{2} (404.3 sq ft)
- Empty weight: 2,230 kg (4,916 lb)
- Gross weight: 3,350 kg (7,385 lb)
- Powerplant: 2 × Argus As-10c (Argus As-10e) 8-cylinder V-line, 180 kW (240 hp) each

Performance

- Maximum speed: 208 km/h (129 mph, 112 kn) 243 at sea level
- Minimum control speed: 93 km/h (58 mph, 50 kn)
- Range: 840 km (520 mi, 450 nmi)
- Service ceiling: 4,340 m (14,240 ft)
- Rate of climb: 3.87 m/s (762 ft/min) to 1,000 m (3,281 ft)

Armament

- guns: 2 x 7,9 mm
- bombs: 1 х 100 kg; or 2 x 50 kg; or 12 x 12 kg

== See also ==
- Sima Milutinović
- Yugoslav Royal Air Force
- Argus As 10

Aircraft of comparable role, configuration, and era

- Rogožarski SIM-XII-H
- Fizir F1V
- Rogožarski PVT
- Rogožarski R-100

Related lists

- List of aircraft of World War II
