= Siemens-Halske Sh 14 =

Seven-cylinder air-cooled radial engine for aircraft

Sh 14
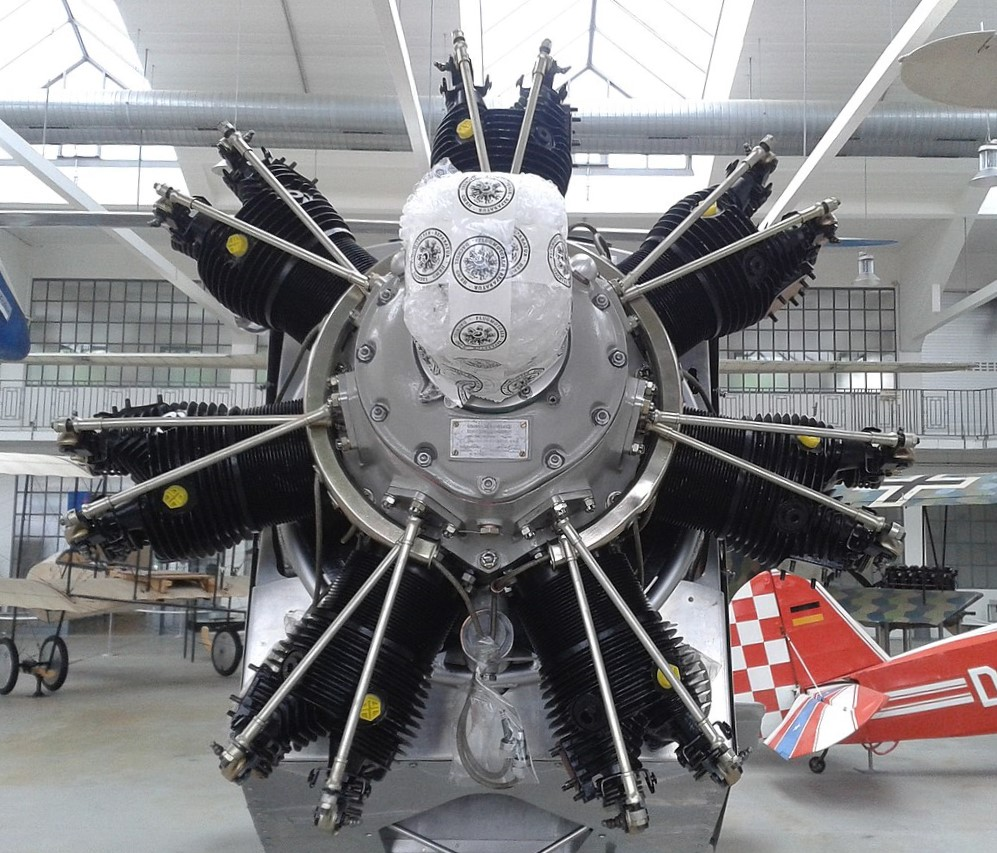
- Type: Radial engine
- Manufacturer: Siemens-Halske
- First run: 1928
- Major applications: Focke-Wulf Fw 44

The Siemens-Halske Sh 14 was a seven-cylinder air-cooled radial engine for aircraft produced in Germany in the 1920s and 1930s. First run in 1928, it was rated at 93 kW (125 hp). It was briefly distributed in the United States by Ryan Aeronautical as the Yankee 7.

== Applications ==
- Albatros L 82
- Ambrosini SAI.3
- Ambrosini SAI.10
- BFW M.23
- BFW M.29
- BFW M.35
- Blohm & Voss Ha 135
- Bücker Bü 133C Jungmeister
- Command-Aire 3C3-BT
- Doblhoff WNF 342
- Flettner Fl 185
- Flettner Fl 265
- Flettner Fl 282
- Focke-Wulf C.19
- Focke-Wulf C.30 Heuschrecke
- Focke-Wulf Fw 44
- Focke-Wulf Fw 61
- Heinkel He 72
- I.Ae. 23
- ICAR Universal
- LWD Szpak
- LWD Zuch
- Nuri Demirağ Nu D.38
- Prudden XM-1
- Prudden TM-1
- RWD-17W
- Rogozarski SIM-VIII
- Rogozarski SIM-XI
- SIM-II
- VL Viima

== Specifications (Bramo Sh 14A-4) ==
Data from Flugzeug-Typenbuch. Handbuch der deutschen Luftfahrt- und Zubehör-Industrie 1944

=== General characteristics ===
- Type: seven-cylinder air-cooled radial engine
- Bore: 108 mm (4.25 in)
- Stroke: 120 mm (4.72 in)
- Displacement: 7.84 L (478.4 cu in)
- Length: 1,008 mm (39.69 in)
- Diameter: 936 mm (36.85 in)
- Dry weight: 135 kg (298 lb)

=== Components ===
- Valvetrain: 1 inlet and 1 exhaust valve per cylinder operated by pushrods and rockers
- Fuel system: 1x SUM 438a or 439a carburetor
- Fuel type: 80 octane
- Oil system: pressure feed at 2–4 atm (29–59 psi; 2.0–4.1 bar), with dry sump
- Cooling system: air

=== Performance ===
- Power output:

- 160 PS (158 hp; 118 kW) at 2,200 rpm (5 minutes) at sea level
- 145 PS (143 hp; 107 kW) at 2,140 rpm (30 minutes) at sea level
- 128 PS (126 hp; 94 kW) at 2,050 rpm (max. continuous / cruise) at sea level

- Specific power: 20.4 PS/L (0.33 hp/cu in; 15.00 kW/L)
- Compression ratio: 6.0:1
- Specific fuel consumption: 0.244 kg/PSh (0.545 lb/(hp⋅h); 0.332 kg/kWh) at max continuous
- Oil consumption: 0.003–0.012 kg/PSh (0.007–0.027 lb/(hp⋅h); 0.004–0.016 kg/kWh) at max continuous
- Power-to-weight ratio: 1.19 PS/kg (0.53 hp/lb; 0.88 kW/kg) at cruise
- B.M.E.P.: 5.95 atm (6.03 bar; 87.4 psi)

== See also ==
- Continental R-670
- Jacobs R-755
- Warner Scarab
