= Sima Milutinović =

Yugoslav mechanical engineer and professor

- Born: 12 July 1899; Mostar, Condominium of Bosnia and Herzegovina, Austro-Hungary
- Died: 11 December 1981 (aged 82); Belgrade, SR Serbia, SFR Yugoslavia
- Education: Polytechnic School in Berlin
- Years active: 1927–1970

Sima Milutinović (Serbian Cyrillic: Сима Милутиновић, 12 July 1899 – 11 December 1981), was a Yugoslav mechanical engineer and a professor at the Faculty of Mechanical Engineering, at the University of Belgrade, the most prolific Yugoslav aircraft constructor.

== Life ==
He was born on 12 July 1899 in Mostar (Herzegovina), where he finished elementary school (four grades) and junior high school. After graduating from the Sarajevo comprehensive grammar school in 1919, he began studies at the Faculty of Technology at the University of Belgrade in October of the same year. During his fifth term, he transferred to Polytechnic School in Berlin. In November 1925 he graduated in general mechanics, specializing in aviation with a B average grade. He died on 11 December 1981, as a retired professor at Faculty of Mechanical Engineering.

== Career ==
Following graduation, he spent some time working in German aircraft industry, however, since the German aviation industry was hampered by the clauses of the Versailles Treaty, Milutinovic went to France where he honed his knowledge in such renowned aircraft factories as "Blériot", "Hanriot", "Breguet", "Potez" and in "Salmson" aircraft engine factory.

In early 1927, he returned to Yugoslavia, where he started working in Ikarus factory in Zemun, Belgrade where all preparations for the production of military aircraft Potez 25 under French license were under way. First he was engaged as the chief of production, and later as a constructor. At the time, domestic hydroplanes were designed and produced in the Novi Sad-based Ikarus factory for the needs of Yugoslav Royal Air Force (YRAF), so, engineer Milutinovic was transferred to Novi Sad where, together with engineer Josef Mickl (the chief of the construction bureau in ÖFFAG before and during World War I, he worked on hydroplane projects and light sports plane "Sivi Soko" ("Gray Hawk"). Having acquired enough working and constructor experience, he left Ikarus in early 1930, and by 1932 he worked on his own projects.

At that period, he was finalizing the project of a light school plane, later named SIM-II, a project he started working on while still working for the French company Blériot. He constructed the plane himself with the financial help of his brother, and fitted it with Siemens SH-14 engine he had bought on loan. The maiden flight was on 29 May 1930 from the Zemun airfield, the prototype built by "S. Vlajković and sons" company from Belgrade. Even though it refused serial production of this plane, the Yugoslav Royal Air Force bought the prototype, and gave it to the Reserve Pilots'’ Association, only to place it at Aeroklub’s disposal for use later on. The plane was in use until 1937, however, when it first appeared, it was of unusual construction for a training plane. It was a high-wing, two-seat aircraft of light construction with side-by-side seats for the pilot and the instructor. The conservative leadership of the air force rejected the plane, but by buying the prototype they motivated the young constructor to continue his work. Based on the prototype testing, the expert public realized that a new and promising young airplane constructor had stepped onto the scene.

As early as 1931, a new prototype of SIM-VIII training aircraft emerged (a tourist-sports plane), a high-wing, two-seat plane, with seats one behind the other, very similar in construction to SIM-II, however, the technological novelties introduced enabled greater rigidity of the plane structure, cheaper production, the plane was lighter, maximum speed was increased, with aerodynamic characteristics greatly improved. With this plane, Sima Milutinović, eng. demonstrated that not only was he an excellent constructor, but also had superb knowledge of production technology. In the period 1932–1935, during the Great Depression, Milutinovic worked in the Air Force Command where, together with a group of engineers (R.Fizir, S.Milutinović, K.Sivčev and A.Bišević) he worked on a joint project, (a thing quite uncommon for those times) and a very successful one, the PVT plane.

From 1935 to 1941, Milutinovic worked in the first Serbian airplane factory "Rogozarski" as the head of the construction bureau and chief of production. This period was the most prolific in this aircraft constructor's career, since in that period alone he designed 11 planes for the needs of the Yugoslav war and navy air force, his projects ranging from single-engine training aircraft to twin-engine light bombers, as well as hydroplanes. Furthermore, Milutinović constructed 12 two-blade to four-blade propellers for aircraft of great power. At the time, engineer Milutinovic had at least 3 planes he was working on at the same time, one on the drawing board of the bureau, the second in the prototype factory or already in serial production and the third already undergoing flight testing.

Following the Axis attack on Yugoslavia in April 1941 and the occupation of Yugoslavia, "Rogožarski" factory started production for the German war industry, so eng. Milutinovic refused to continue working for the company, and remained engaged as professor at the University, though no classes were held. Right after the liberation of Belgrade in October 1944, he returned to Rogozarski as a technical manager of the company which now organized repair and revision of airplanes for the needs of the Red Army and the Yugoslav air force. During that period, he was finishing the reconstruction of shock absorbers and upgrading of landing gears for JAKs, Jakovljev fighters.

In the WWII post-war period, professor Milutinović continued to construct aircraft; as early as 1946 he took part in the competition opened by Yugoslav air force. Based on a pre-war R-313 bomber, he designed a twin-engine training bomber Ikarus 214, which was produced in several series in Ikarus factory. As an experienced designer he worked on several airplane types, and was an associate expert to the Aviation Military Technical Bureau in Zarkovo, Belgrade.

== Aircraft projects ==
- SIM-II – aircraft for basic training aircraft, 1930,
- SIM-VIII – sports coach airplane 1931,
- Rogožarski SIM-VI- a sports coach airplane 1937,
- Rogožarski PVT – fighter trainer aircraft 1934,
- Rogožarski PVT-H – advanced trainer seaplane 1936,.
- Rogožarski SIM-X – single engine two-seater trainer aircraft for initial training and piloting, 1936
- Rogožarski SI-Gyp – SIM-X modifications, with Gypsy Major engine, 1940
- Rogožarski SIM-Xa – modification of SIM-X -trainer aircraft for night operations, 1940
- Rogožarski R-100 – a single-engine plane, single seater for training in higher flight schools, 1938.
- Rogožarski SIM-XI – aerobatic airplane, single-seater designed for training and training of fighter pilots, 1938
- Rogožarski SIM-XII-H – trainer seaplane 1938,
- Rogožarski SIM-XIV-H – coastal reconnaissance plane, 1938,
- Rogozarski SIM XIVB-H – seaplane bomber, 1940,
- Rogožarski R-313 (originally called SIM-XV) – multipurpose fighter-destroyer 1940,
- Ikarus 214 – multipurpose aircraft 1949.

== Gallery ==
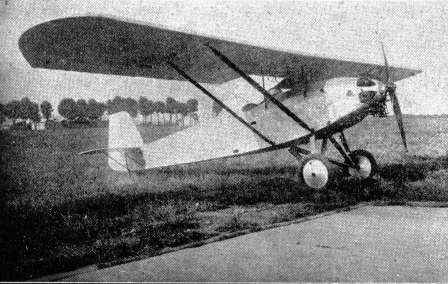
SIM-II a sports and training aircraft (1930).

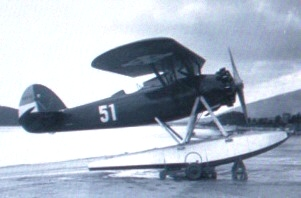
A Yugoslav training float-plane Rogožarski PVT-H (1934).

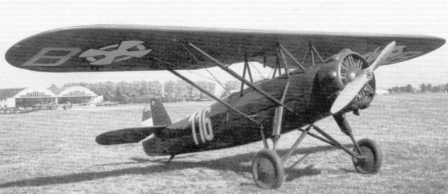
Rogožarski SIM-X Yugoslav aircraft trainer (1936).

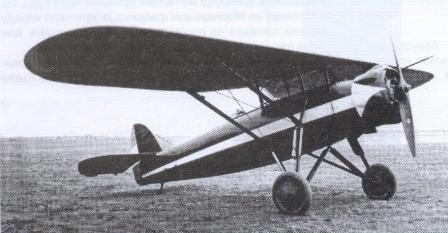
Rogožarski SIM-XI Yugoslav aircraft advanced trainer (1938).

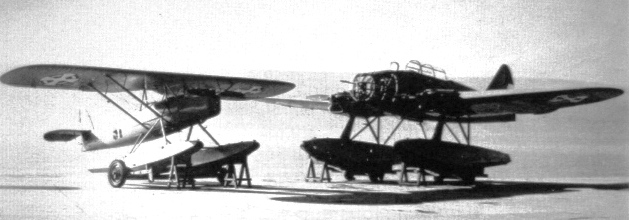
Rogožarski SIM-XIV-H float-plane Maritime Reconnaissance and Rogožarski SIM-XII-H Training float-plane (1938).

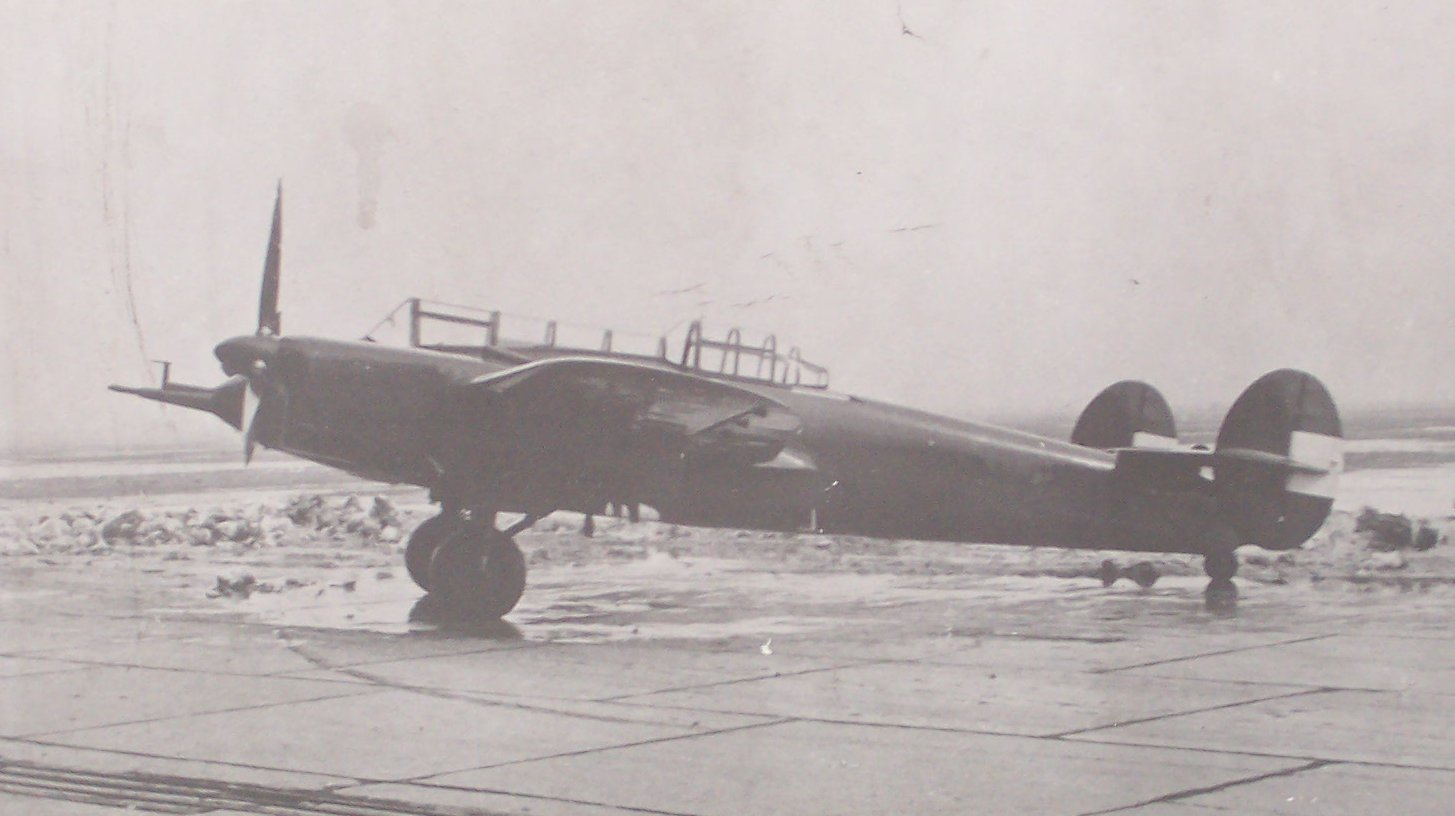
Light Bomber and Destroyer Rogožarski R-313 of the Yugoslav Air Force (1940).

== Teaching career ==
As early as 1934, Milutinović started teaching at the Faculty of Technology, Belgrade University, as a lecturer, and in 1938 he was elected University reader for the subject Aviation Construction and Propulsion, at the Group for Aviation Studies, Department of Technical Engineering, Faculty of Technology. As of 1946, Sima Multinovic dedicated himself completely to working as a lecturer at the Faculty of Mechanical Engineering, where he laid solid foundations for modern studies, thus educating young minds our air force was in great need of. The Faculty of Mechanical Engineering lacked teaching staff, so S. Milutinović as university lecturer also taught a number of other specialized subjects not closely related to aviation, such as Mechanical Tools, Mechanical Technology and Materials Testing. Nevertheless, teaching so many subjects was not a problem, given his vast pre-war experience, as a production engineer in Ikarus and a technical director in Rogozarski. In 1948, he was elected associate professor at the Aviation Department, of the Faculty of Mechanical Engineering, for the subject Airplane construction, while in 1951 he was elected full-tenured professor for the same subject. As Dean of the faculty of Mechanical Engineering (for two consecutive school years, 1952–1953, 1953–1954), he contributed greatly to modernizing study programs by introducing experiments into studies, setting up and equipping much needed labs in the Faculty. His further contribution was starting a postgraduate study programme at the Aviation Military Technical Academy in Zarkovo in 1966 as the centre of the Faculty of Mechanical Engineering. He also launched postgraduate studies at his own faculty, establishing the concept of postgraduate studies by tapping into his rich experience as a lecturer and constructor. In his 25-year-long teaching career at the Faculty of Mechanical Engineering before he retired in 1970, 420 of his students graduated from the Department of Aviation Studies, and 70 attendees graduated from the Aviation Military Technical Academy in Zarkovo. In 1971, he was awarded the title of honorary professor of the University of Belgrade, as one of the most distinguished professors for developing science and studies in mechanical engineering.

== Books ==
From 1933 to 1941, Milutinović published a number of papers in aviation in the Yugoslav Aviation Almanac. After the war, while he worked at the Faculty, he wrote a university textbook Aviation Construction at the time when such literature was lacking in more developed countries than Yugoslavia. The second revised edition was published in 1970.

- Milutinović, Sima (1970), Konstrukcija aviona + Dodatak: Atlas aviona. ("Aircraft construction +Appendix: Aircraft atlas"), Belgrade, published by Gradjevinska knjiga

Furthermore, he worked intensively on writing encyclopedias, so in 1951 he coauthored "The technology of aviation" as part of the Encyclopedia of Technical Knowledge. He wrote the section on aircraft construction as part of the Technical Encyclopedia, published by the Yugoslav Institute of Lexicography in 1963.
