= Rogožarski SIM-XII-H =

Yugoslav trainer single-engine floatplane

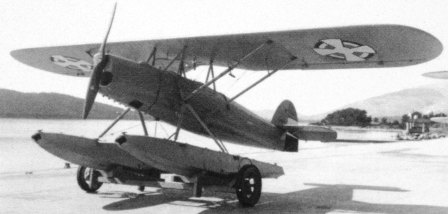

General information
- Type: Trainer floatplane
- National origin: Yugoslavia
- Manufacturer: Prva Srpska Fabrika Aeroplana Živojin Rogožarski AD.
- Designer: Sima Milutinović
- Status: inactive
- Primary user: Yugoslav Royal Air Force
- Number built: 9

History
- Manufactured: from 1939 to 1941
- Introduction date: 1939
- First flight: 7 February 1938
- Retired: 1941
- Developed from: Rogožarski SIM-X

The Rogožarski SIM-XII-H (Serbian Cyrillic: Рогожарски СИМ-XII-Х) was a Yugoslav trainer single-engine floatplane, with two floats designed in 1938. It was designed and built at the Rogožarski factory in Belgrade.

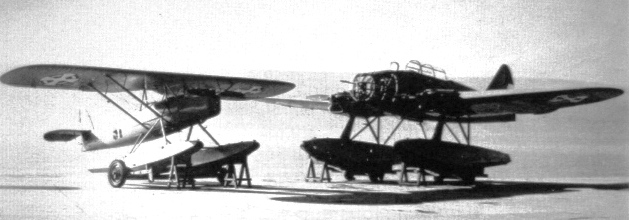
Seaplanes Rogožarski SIM-XII-H (left) and SIM-XIV-H (right) (Kumbor 1938)

== Design and development ==
The YRAF was unsuccessfully trying to choose the most appropriate seaplane for pilot training so they turned to the Rogožarski factory for help in 1937 and ordered the seaplane school project to be made that would fit in its characteristics to the school plane SIM-X. Since it was not possible to make a simple modification (adaptation of existing aircraft SIM-X) for installation of EDO floats, chief designed Sima Milutinović fitted the plane with a more powerful engine Walter Major 6 190 hp, leading to an increase in aircraft size. Thus, this new high-flying school plane with two floats represented an entirely new plane, designated SIM-XII-H. During 1937, the project went into realization stage, and as early as the end of the year the prototype was ready for testing. The test flight was conducted on February 7, 1938, by test pilot Ivan Koroša in hydro-base Divulje. After the flight tests had achieved satisfactory results, the first batch of aircraft was ordered, which were delivered in mid-1939.

Aircraft SIM-XII-H, a supported two-seat high-flying plane, with engine Walter Major 6 (190 hp), of predominantly wooden construction, with an elliptical cross-section of fuselage entirely made of wood and covered with plywood, wings as the supporting structure made of wood covered with fabric, with rounded ends. On each side, the wings are supported by a pair of inclined struts attached to the fuselage. The fuel tank was located in the central part between the wings, that is, at their junction. The first series of aircraft had two (a pair of) EDO floats installed (EDO Float Model 47).

== Operational history ==
As for experience with the use of aircraft SIM-XII-H, which was called by pilots and technical staff of the aircraft "little SIM", were very positive and the navy command (Royal Maritime Navy) signed a contract with Rogožarski factory on July 15, 1940 for the second series of these plane (4 aircraft) with the difference that these seaplanes were equipped for instrument, or, "blind" flying. Rogožarski delivered these aircraft in five months but without floats as the delivery from Canada was delayed for several months. Upon the agreement reached between the Rogozarski factory and the Navy command, the design and development of domestic aircraft floats was launched, unfortunately this project did not reach completion due to the outbreak of April war. In the pre-war period two SIM-XII-H aircraft were in accidents both in Boka Kotorska in 1940. Both aircraft were designated for disposal, so the Navy Command requested approval to install the floats from these planes onto new aircraft (onto the 2nd series of SIM-XII-H ) considering that these planes were equipped with instruments for instrumental ("blind") flying. When the approval was given, the floats were installed into new planes, so the aircraft in the second series were enabled for use before the war broke out.

== Operators ==
Kingdom of Yugoslavia

- Royal Yugoslav Air Force 9 aircraft
- Yugoslav Royal Navy

== Specifications ==
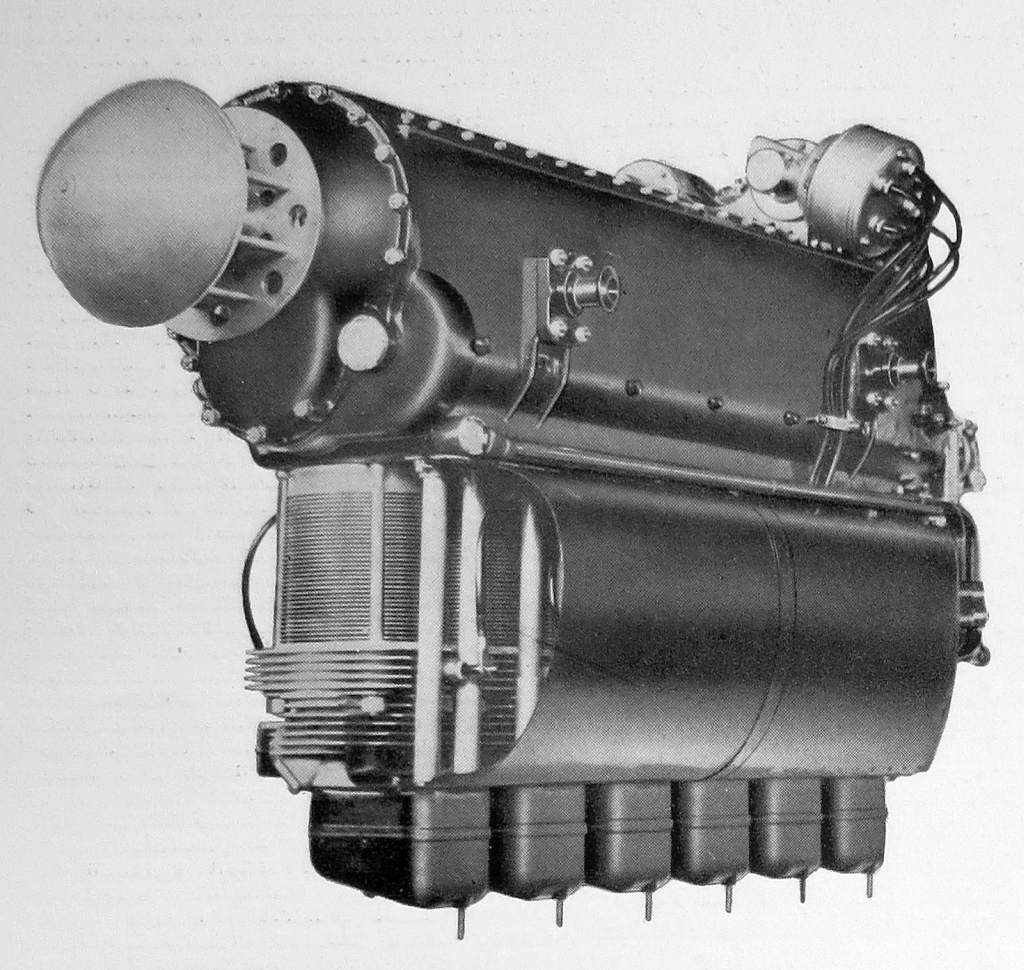
Engine installed in aircraft Seaplanes Rogožarski SIM-XII-H

Data from Станојевић, Д.; Јанић, Ч; (12/1982.).

General characteristics

- Crew: 2
- Length: 7.50 m (24 ft 7 in)
- Wingspan: 11.00 m (36 ft 1 in)
- Height: 2.96 m (9 ft 9 in)
- Wing area: 2,050 m^{2} (22,100 sq ft)
- Empty weight: 635 kg (1,400 lb)
- Gross weight: 920 kg (2,028 lb)
- Powerplant: 1 × Walter Major 6, 6-cylinder line,, 140 kW (190 hp)
- Propellers: 2-bladed

Performance

- Maximum speed: 208 km/h (129 mph, 112 kn) 212 at sea level
- Range: 840 km (520 mi, 450 nmi)

== See also ==
- Yugoslav Royal Air Force
- Sima Milutinović

Aircraft of comparable role, configuration, and era

- Rogožarski SIM-XIV-H
- Fizir F1V
- Rogožarski PVT
- Rogožarski R-100

Related lists

- List of aircraft of World War II
