= Rogožarski AZR =

Rogožarski AŽR
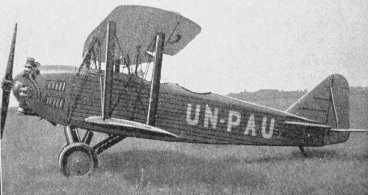

General information
- Type: Trainer
- National origin: Yugoslavia
- Manufacturer: Prva Srpska Fabrika Aeroplana Živojin Rogožarski, Belgrade
- Designer: Eng. Viljem Šuster
- Status: inactive
- Primary user: Yugoslav Royal Air Force
- Number built: 1

History
- First flight: 1930
- Retired: 1937

The Rogožarski AŽR (Serbian Cyrillic:Рогожарски АЖР) was a single-engined, two-seat biplane aircraft designed as a trainer in Yugoslavia before World War II. It was designed and built at the Rogožarski factory in Belgrade.

== Design and development ==
William Schuster, a flight engineer, designed the AŽR at the end of 1929. The first test flight of the prototype was conducted by a factory test pilot on 5 November 1930. The aircraft was a biplane with the lower wing smaller than the upper. It was equipped with a seven-cylinder Walter Castor air-cooled radial engine of 240 hp and a wooden double-bladed propeller. The plane had dual controls, the two crew (pilot and flight instructor), sat one behind the other. It was to be employed as an intermediate trainer, replacing the outdated Hansa-Brandenburg C.I. The fuselage, which was of rectangular cross-section, was made of wood and covered with plywood. The wings had rounded ends, each was connected by a pair of metal struts and wire tensioners. Construction of the wing involved the use of wood covered with canvas. The landing gear was fixed and had no axle.

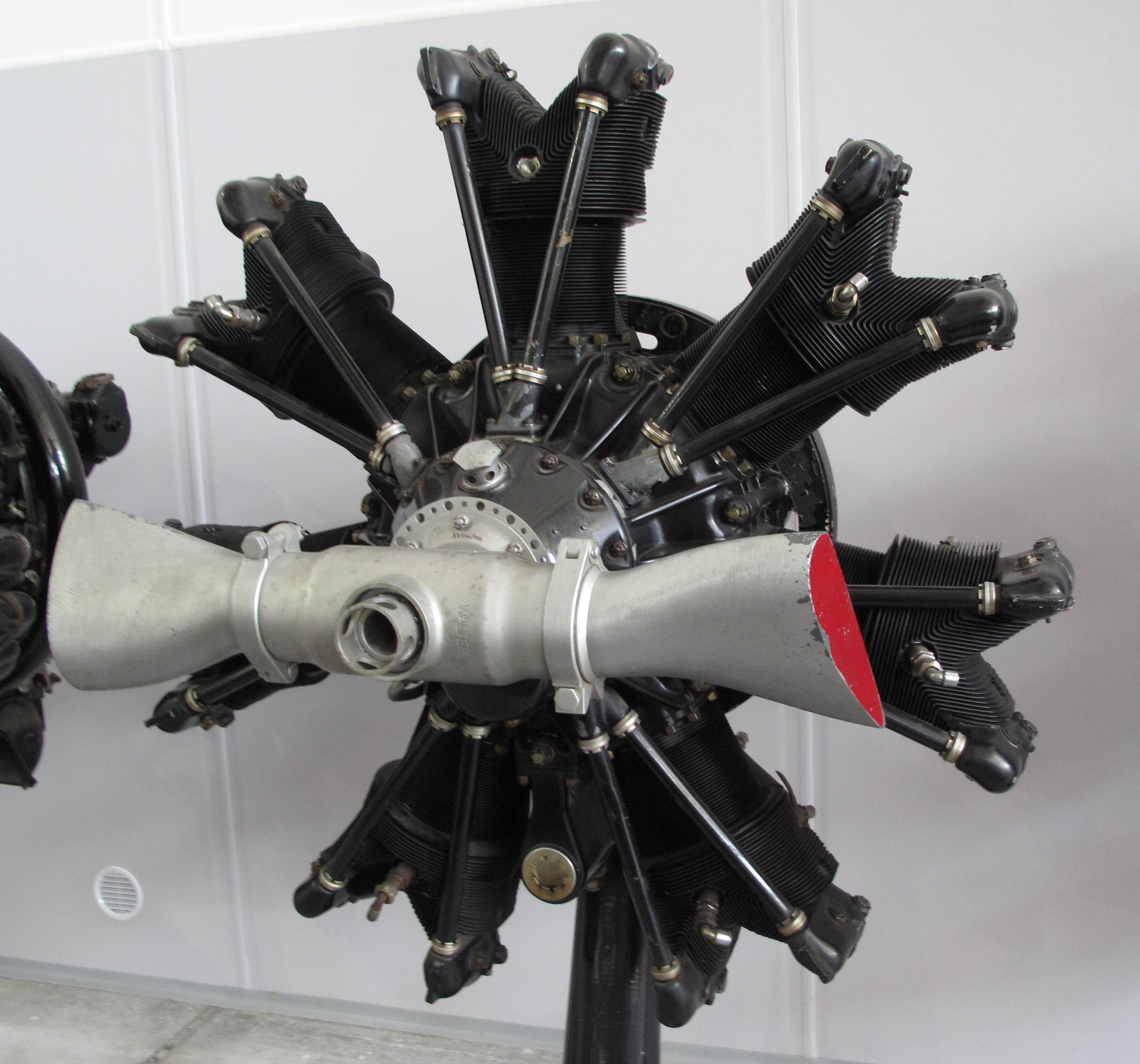
A Walter Castor engine that was installed in the Rogozarski AZR

== Operational history ==
After the completion of factory tests, the aircraft was examined by the Yugoslav Royal Air Force Commission but it did not allow mass production due to a number of perceived shortcomings in the machines' handling. The aircraft was only used in 1931 for advertising purposes, demonstration flights and participation in air shows. It also competed in the King's Cup and the like; AZR still hoped to come to some arrangement with the military. This did not happen, Rogozarski withdrew from aircraft design, the prototype was registered as a civilian plane and used by the factory. It received the civil registration UN-PAU. In the meantime, the economic situation was such that the AŽR was standing in its hangar, waiting for better days; despite bank loans, there was a distinct lack of orders and the company went bankrupt in 1933.

Circumstances improved in the summer of 1934 when the Yugoslav Air Force bought the AZR and the fortunes of the factory improved, becoming a shareholder company. The AŽR was used as a trainer until 1937.

== Operators ==
Kingdom of Yugoslavia

- Royal Yugoslav Air Force 1 aircraft

== Specifications ==
Data from :Janić, Čedomir. "Rogožarski AŽR" (in (Serbian)). Aeromagazin No.17 (-{YU}--Београд: BB Soft), p 34. ISSN 1450-6068.

General characteristics

- Crew: 2
- Length: 7.55 m (24 ft 9 in)
- Wingspan: 10.55 m (34 ft 7 in)
- Height: 3.05 m (10 ft 0 in)
- Wing area: 27.00 m^{2} (290.6 sq ft)
- Empty weight: 859 kg (1,894 lb)
- Gross weight: 1,433 kg (3,159 lb)
- Powerplant: 1 × Walter Castor, (7-cylinder radial), 176 kW (240 hp)
- Propellers: 2-bladed

Performance215 at sea level

- Range: 745 km (463 mi, 402 nmi)
- Service ceiling: 5,320 m (17,450 ft)
- Rate of climb: 4.78 m/s (941 ft/min)

== See also ==
- Yugoslav Royal Air Force
- SIM-II
- SIM-VIII
- Rogožarski PVT
- Walter Castor
