= Rogožarski PVT =

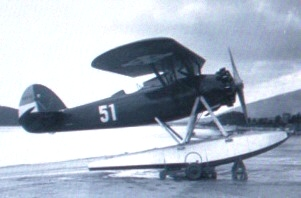
- Seaplane variant

General information
- Type: Advanced trainer
- National origin: Yugoslavia
- Manufacturer: Rogožarski, Belgrade
- Designer: R. Fizir; Sima Milutinović; Kosta Sivčev and Adem Biščević
- Status: inactive
- Primary user: Yugoslav Royal Air Force
- Number built: 61

History
- Introduction date: 1936
- First flight: c.1934
- Retired: 1945

The Rogožarski PVT (Serbian Cyrillic: Рогожарски ПВТ; transliterated as Rogozarski PWT in German and as Rogojarsky PVT in some older English sources) was a single-engined, two-seat parasol winged aircraft designed as an advanced and fighter trainer in Yugoslavia before World War II. Over 60 were built, serving with the Yugoslav Royal Air Force (YAF) until the fall of Yugoslavia in 1941. After that, some PVTs were used by the newly formed Air Force of the Independent State of Croatia, sometimes as ground attack aircraft.

== Design and development ==
The Prva Srpska Fabrika Aeroplana Živojin Rogožarski was the first Serbian aircraft manufacturer in Yugoslavia, founded in 1924. In about 1933 its team of Rudolf Fizir, Sima Milutinović, Kosta Sivčev and Adem Biščević designed the PVT, a training aircraft with tandem open cockpits in an oval wooden monocoque fuselage. Its wooden, canvas covered wings were swept and parasol mounted well above the fuselage with pairs of lift struts to the lower fuselage and a central inverted V cabane. They carried long narrow chord ailerons, with prominent spades well clear of the upper surfaces.

The PVT was powered by a 420 hp (313 kW) 7-cylinder radial Gnome-Rhône 7K radial engine, housed with its cylinder heads exposed and driving a two-bladed propeller. The fixed, divided type undercarriage had on each side a main shock absorber leg; its upper end attached to a steel pyramid protruding from the mid-fuselage keeping the leg closer to the vertical whilst providing a wide track. Each wheel was connected to the lower fuselage with a swinging V-strut. A simple tail skid completed the undercarriage. The horizontal tail and fixed fin were both canvas covered wooden structures, though the moving surfaces, also canvas covered, had metal frames. The tailplane was strut braced to the fuselage from below and wire braced above to the fin. It carried elevators which were spade assisted like the ailerons but also horn balanced. The unbalanced rudder was broad and rounded.

== Operational history ==
The PVT prototype probably first flew in 1934. An initial production batch of 20 aircraft was delivered to the YAF during 1936. Another 40 were delivered during 1938–1939, of which the last 10 had fixed 7.7 mm (0.303 in) forward-firing Darne machine guns fitted and were powered by a licence-built version of the Gnôme-Rhône 7K engine, the IAM K7. More PVTs were under construction at the time of the Italo-German invasion of Yugoslavia in April 1941. During the invasion, PVTs that survived initial German air attacks were used by the Yugoslavs for reconnaissance and liaison duties. Fifteen PVTs (Note: Fourteen according to Němeček.) captured by the Germans were presented to the newly formed Air Force of the Independent State of Croatia. These aircraft were used for reconnaissance operations against resistance forces, with several aircraft modified to carry a single 100 kg (220 lb) bomb. Italian forces also captured several PVTs, which were used for anti-partisan operations over Montenegro. Two PVTs survived the war and entered service with the new Yugoslav Air Force. They remained in use until the end of the decade.

A few PVTs, designated PVT-H, (the H from hidro) were configured as seaplanes on standard Edo (EDO Float Model 38) floats mounted on N-shaped struts. During 1938 and 1939, four PVT-H aircraft were delivered to the Yugoslav Royal Navy.

== Operators ==
Croatia

- Air Force of the Independent State of Croatia 15 ex-Royal Yugoslav Air Force

Kingdom of Italy

- Regia Aeronautica

Kingdom of Yugoslavia

- Royal Yugoslav Air Force 61 aircraft
- Yugoslav Royal Navy

Yugoslavia

- Yugoslav Air Force

== Specifications ==
Data from Grey 1972, p. 314–5c

General characteristics

- Crew: 2
- Length: 8.54 m (28 ft 0 in)
- Wingspan: 11.20 m (36 ft 9 in)
- Height: 2.81 m (9 ft 3 in)
- Wing area: 22.1 m^{2} (238 sq ft)
- Empty weight: 967 kg (2,132 lb)
- Gross weight: 1,213 kg (2,674 lb)
- Powerplant: 1 × Gnome-Rhône 7K 7-cylinder radial, 310 kW (420 hp)

Performance

- Maximum speed: 240 km/h (150 mph, 130 kn) at sea level
- Service ceiling: 7,000 m (23,000 ft)
- Rate of climb: 6.54 m/s (1,287 ft/min) to 2,000 m (6,562 ft)

== See also ==
- Rogožarski AZR
- Rogožarski SIM-X
- Rogožarski R-100
