= Rogožarski R-100 =

- Rogožarski R-100

General information
- Type: Advanced trainer
- National origin: Kingdom of Yugoslavia
- Manufacturer: Prva Srpska Fabrika Aeroplana Živojin Rogožarski, Belgrade
- Designer: Sima Milutinović
- Primary users: Yugoslav Royal Air Force Croatian Air Force; Regia Aeronautica
- Number built: 26

History
- Manufactured: 1937 to 1939
- Introduction date: 1939
- First flight: 1938
- Retired: 1950
- Developed from: Rogožarski PVT

The Rogožarski R-100 (Serbian Cyrillic:Рогожарски Р-100, transliterated as Rogožarski R-100 in German and as Rogojarsky Р-100 in some older English sources) was a single-engined, single-seat parasol winged aircraft designed as an advanced and fighter trainer built by Rogozarski in Yugoslavia before World War II. About 26 were built, serving with the Yugoslav Royal Air Force until the fall of Yugoslavia in 1941. After that, 11 R-100s were used by the newly formed Air Force of the Independent State of Croatia, sometimes as ground attack aircraft, and one R-100 was used by the Italian Regia Aeronautica.

== Design and development ==
The Prva Srpska Fabrika Aeroplana Živojin Rogožarski A.D. was the first Serbian aircraft manufacturer in Yugoslavia, founded in 1924. In about 1938 they designed the Rogožarski R-100, a training aircraft with a single open cockpit in an oval wooden monocoque fuselage, a successor to their Rogožarski PVT. It came from the design team of Prof. Sima Milutinović. Its wooden, fabric-covered wings were slightly swept and parasol-mounted above the fuselage, attached with lift struts to the lower fuselage and with a central inverted-V Cabane strut. Its ailerons were full-span, narrow-chord, fabric-covered metal-structure units, with prominent spades above the wing's upper surface.

The R-100 was powered by a 420 hp (313 kW) 7-cylinder radial IAM K-7 license-built version of the Gnome-Rhône 7K radial engine, driving a two-bladed propeller. The engine mounting incorporated an NACA cowling. The forward fuselage was metal-covered from the engine to the 158-liter fuselage-mounted fuel tank, after which the fuselage was fabric-covered. The fixed, divided type undercarriage had a main shock absorber leg, its upper end attached to a steel attachment near the mid-fuselage, allowing the wheel to remain nearly vertical during deflections, whilst providing a wide track. The wheels were connected to the lower fuselage with a swinging V-strut. A steerable tailwheel was used.

The fixed members of the empennage were fabric-covered wooden structures; the moveable portions were fabric-covered metal structures.

== Operational history ==
The R-100 prototype probably first flew in 1938, piloted by Miloš Gagić. An initial production batch of 15 aircraft was delivered to the YRAF during 1939. The first R-100 units were immediately sent to Niš for the fighter-pilot training use. Another 10 were delivered during 1939-40, with fixed 7.7 mm (0.303 in) Darne machine guns and photo gun (camera). These planes were designed for fighter-pilot training in Bela Crkva. Aircraft R-100 were used extensively before the war for pilot training.

At the time of the Italo-German invasion of Yugoslavia in April 1941, the Italians seized one R-100, the Germans took another eleven; the remaining aircraft were destroyed. The Germans gave their captured R-100s to their Croatian allies, who used them for training during the rest of the war. In the initial period the R-100s were used for pilot training, and later were fitted with mountings for a 90–100 kg bomb and were used for bombing. Several R-100s were used to patrol the outskirts of Zagreb, to repel the attacks of partisan aircraft. The last combat flight of an R-100 was on 26 April 1945. Two R-100s were given to the partisan faction at the end of the war, and two were seized at the Lucko airport near Zagreb during the liberation. All four planes that survived the war are included in the Yugoslav Army Air Force (JRV). One each was used by the 111th and 112 Fighting regiment, the third was used in the VTC (Aeronautic Technical Center) and the fourth was used by the commander of 4th bomber division. The JRV planes remained in use until the 1950s, after which they were retired. A partial R-100 is in the Museum of Aviation at Belgrade Nikola Tesla Airport.

== Operators ==
Kingdom of Yugoslavia

- Royal Yugoslav Air Force 26 aircraft

Yugoslavia

- SFR Yugoslav Air Force - Postwar.

Croatia

- Air Force of the Independent State of Croatia 11 ex-Royal Yugoslav Air Force

Italy

- Regia Aeronautica 1 aircraft.

== Specifications ==
Data from Станојевић, Драгољуб; Чедомир Јанић (December 1982). "Животни пут и дело једног великана нашег ваздухопловства - светао пример и узор нараштајима". Машинство (in Serbian). 31. -{YU}--Београд: Савез инжењера и техничара Југославије: 1867–1876.

General characteristics

- Crew: 1
- Length: 7.35 m (24 ft 1 in)
- Wingspan: 10.20 m (33 ft 6 in)
- Height: 3.00 m (9 ft 10 in)
- Wing area: 20.56 m^{2} (221.3 sq ft)
- Empty weight: 1,024 kg (2,258 lb)
- Gross weight: 1,326 kg (2,923 lb)
- Powerplant: 1 × Gnome-Rhône 7K 7-cylinder radial, 313 kW (420 hp)
- Propellers: 2-bladed

Performance

- Maximum speed: 260 km/h (162 mph, 141 kn) 251 at sea level
- Range: 473 km (294 mi, 255 nmi)
- Service ceiling: 7,750 m (25,430 ft)
- Rate of climb: 5.42 m/s (1,067 ft/min)

Armament

- Guns: 1 x 7,7 mm Darne
- Bombs: 1 x 100 kg
- guns: 1 x 7,7 mm Darne
- bombs: 1 x 100 kg

== See also ==
- Yugoslav Royal Air Force
- Rogožarski SIM-X
- Rogožarski PVT
- Sima Milutinović - Aircraft constructor
- List of aircraft of World War II
