= German bombing of Belgrade =

German bombing of Belgrade, Yugoslavia during World War 2

- Part of the invasion of Yugoslavia
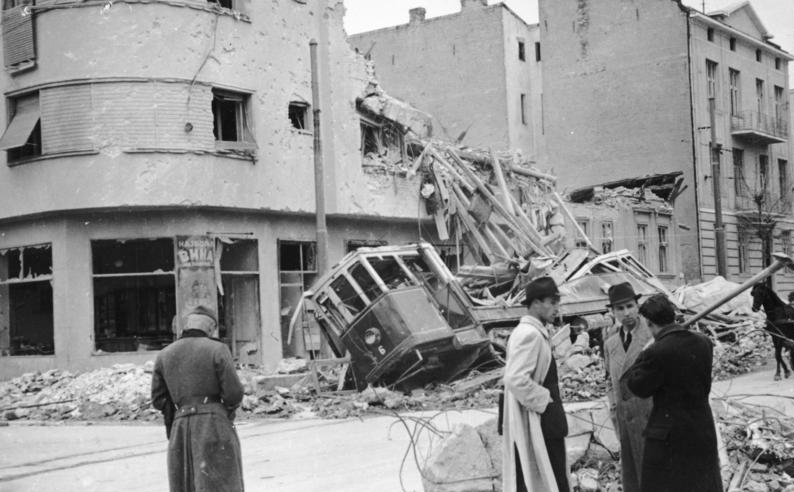
- Bomb-damaged buildings in Belgrade in April 1941
Date	6–7/8 April 1941
Location	Belgrade, Yugoslavia 44°49′04″N 20°27′25″E
Result	Paralysis of Yugoslav command and control; Widespread destruction and civilian casualties

Belligerents
Germany	Yugoslavia

Units involved
Luftflotte IV; Fliegerkorps VIII	Royal Yugoslav Army Air Force

Casualties and losses
- see Aftermath section

Operation Retribution (German: Unternehmen Strafgericht) or Operation Punishment (Note: The military historian Christopher Chant states that the codename was Unternehmen Bestrafung (Operation Punishment). Martin Gilbert, a historian specialising in the Holocaust, writes that the operation was codenamed Castigo ("punishment"). The historian Vladimir Terzić offers the Serbo-Croatian translation, Kazna ("punishment").) was the April 1941 German bombing of Belgrade, the capital of Yugoslavia, in retaliation for the coup d'état that overthrew the government that had signed the Tripartite Pact. The bombing occurred in the first days of the German-led Axis invasion of Yugoslavia during World War II. The Royal Yugoslav Army Air Force (VVKJ) had only 77 modern fighter aircraft available to defend Belgrade against the hundreds of German fighters and bombers that struck in the first wave early on 6 April. Three days prior, VVKJ Major Vladimir Kren had defected to the Germans, disclosing the locations of multiple military assets and divulging the VVKJ's codes.

Three more waves of bombers attacked Belgrade on 6 April, and more attacks followed in subsequent days. The attacks resulted in the paralysis of Yugoslav civilian and military command and control, the widespread destruction of Belgrade's infrastructure, and many civilian casualties. The ground invasion had begun a few hours earlier, and air attacks were also made on VVKJ airfields and other strategic targets across Yugoslavia. Among the non-military targets struck during the bombing were the National Library of Serbia, which burned to the ground with the loss of hundreds of thousands of books and manuscripts, and the Belgrade Zoo.

The senior Luftwaffe officer responsible for the bombing, Generaloberst Alexander Löhr, was captured by the Yugoslavs at the end of the war and was tried and executed for war crimes, in part for his involvement in the bombing of Belgrade.

Kren was arrested in 1947 on unrelated charges of war crimes stemming from his subsequent service as the head of the Air Force of the Independent State of Croatia. He was extradited to Yugoslavia to face trial, convicted on all counts, and executed in 1948. A monument erected in Zemun in 1997 commemorates the airmen killed in Belgrade's defence. The bombing has been dramatised in literature and film.

In retaliation for the invasion of Yugoslavia, which surrendered on 17 April, the Royal Air Force carried out two bombing raids on Sofia, the capital of Axis Bulgaria, which later took part in Yugoslavia's partition.

== Background ==
=== Yugoslav coup d'état ===
Following Germany's 1938 Anschluss of Austria, Yugoslavia shared a border with the Third Reich and came under increasing pro-Axis political pressure as its neighbours fell into line with the Axis powers. In April 1939, Yugoslavia gained a second frontier with Italy when Italy invaded Albania. Between September and November 1940, Hungary joined the Tripartite Pact, Italy invaded Greece, and Romania also joined the Pact. From that time, Yugoslavia was almost surrounded by Axis powers or their client states, and its neutral stance toward the war was under tremendous pressure. On 14 February 1941, Adolf Hitler invited Prime Minister Dragiša Cvetković and Foreign Minister Aleksandar Cincar-Marković to Berchtesgaden, and requested that Yugoslavia also join the Pact. On 1 March, Bulgaria joined, and the next day, German troops entered Bulgaria from Romania, closing the ring around Yugoslavia.

Further pressure was applied by Hitler on 4 March 1941, when the Yugoslav regent, Prince Paul, visited Berchtesgaden, but the prince delayed a decision. On 6 March, the Royal Yugoslav Army Air Force (Serbo-Croatian: Vazduhoplovstvo Vojske Kraljevine Jugoslavije, VVKJ) was secretly mobilised. The following day, British troops began landing in Greece to bolster that country's defences against the Italians. On 12 March, the VVKJ began dispersing to auxiliary airfields. By 20 March, the VVKJ's dispersal had been completed. Hitler, wishing to secure his southern flank in anticipation of Germany's impending invasion of the Soviet Union, demanded that Yugoslavia sign the Pact. On 25 March, the Yugoslav government complied. Two days later, a group of VVKJ and Royal Guard officers, led by Brigadier General Borivoje Mirković, deposed Prince Paul in a coup d'état. Paul's 17-year-old nephew Peter assumed full power as King.

=== Preparations ===
The day of the coup, Hitler issued Directive 25, which stated that the coup had changed the political situation in the Balkans. He ordered that "even if Yugoslavia at first should give declarations of loyalty, she must be considered as a foe and therefore must be destroyed as quickly as possible". German reconnaissance aircraft frequently violated Yugoslav airspace in the aftermath of the coup. VVKJ fighters were placed on constant alert. The German incursions demonstrated that the Yugoslav ground observation post network and supporting radio communications were inadequate. Hitler decided that Belgrade would be bombed as punishment for the coup, under the codename Operation Retribution (Unternehmen Strafgericht). On 27 and 28 March 1941, Reichsmarschall Hermann Göring transferred about 500 fighter and bomber aircraft from France and northern Germany to airfields near the Yugoslav border. The commander of Luftflotte IV, Generaloberst (General) Alexander Löhr, allocated these aircraft to attack the Yugoslav capital in waves by day and night. Löhr issued his orders for the bombing on 31 March, but the decision to bomb Belgrade would not be confirmed by Hitler until 5 April. Hitler ordered the general destruction of Belgrade, but at the last minute Löhr replaced these general directions with specific military objectives within the city.

On 3 April, Major Vladimir Kren flew a Potez 25 aircraft to Graz and defected to the Germans. He disclosed the locations of many of Yugoslavia's dispersal airfields, as well as codes used by the VVKJ, which had to be quickly changed. Also disclosed were the location of Yugoslavia's troop mobilisation centres and air-raid shelters in Belgrade. On the afternoon of 5 April, a British colonel visited Mirković at the VVKJ base in Zemun and informed him that the attack on Belgrade would commence at 06:30 the next day. The previous day, the Yugoslav government had declared Belgrade an open city in the event of hostilities. The German embassy had informed its government that Belgrade did not contain any anti-aircraft defences, but in an effort to justify the attack to the public, German propaganda branded the city "Fortress Belgrade" after the first bombs were dropped.

By 6 April, the VVKJ had been almost completely mobilised, and consisted of four air brigades with more than 423 aircraft of Yugoslav, German, Italian, French, Czech and British design, including 107 modern fighters and 100 modern medium bombers. Other than a small number of locally made Rogožarski IK-3 fighters, almost all the modern aircraft available to the VVKJ were of German, Italian or British design for which limited spares and munitions were available. The available aircraft were spread all over the country, and only the 1st Fighter Brigade was near enough to Belgrade to respond to an attack on the capital. In total, the 1st Fighter Brigade fielded 56 Messerschmitt Bf 109E-3a fighters, 15 Hawker Hurricane MkIs, and six Rogožarski IK-3s.

== Bombing ==
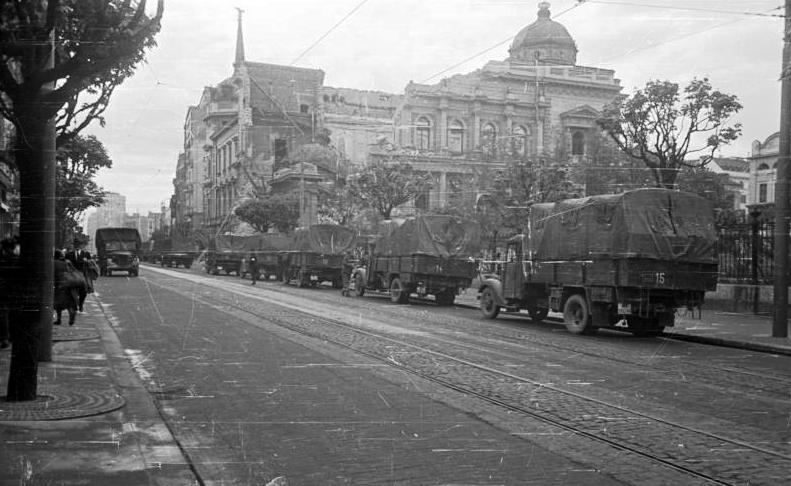
The bomb-damaged Old Palace in central Belgrade, struck during the first wave of bombing on 6 April 1941

German ground forces crossed the Yugoslav border at 05:15 on 6 April, and the Reich Minister of Propaganda, Joseph Goebbels, announced Germany's declaration of war at 06:00. Yugoslav anti-aircraft defences caused a false alarm when they reported the approach of an air raid from the direction of Romania at 03:00, but listening posts on the Romanian border had heard the aircraft engines of the Romanian-based Fliegerführer Arad warming up well before they took off. The VVKJ's 51st Fighter Group at Zemun had been alerted before dawn, and when reports began to be received about Luftwaffe attacks on VVKJ airfields, the first patrol was sent into the air. At first, no aircraft could be seen approaching Belgrade.

The first wave closed on Belgrade between 06:30 and 06:45, and consisted of 74 Junkers Ju 87 Stuka dive bombers, and 160 Heinkel He 111 medium bombers and Dornier Do 17 light bombers at 8,000–10,000 ft (2,400–3,000 m). They were escorted by Messerschmitt Bf 110 heavy fighters at 11,000–12,000 ft (3,400–3,700 m) and 100 Messerschmitt Bf 109E fighters at 15,000 ft (4,600 m). The entire Yugoslav 6th Fighter Brigade, consisting of the 51st Fighter Group at Zemun and the 32nd Fighter Group at Prnjavor, totalling 29 Messerschmitt Bf 109Es and five Rogožarski IK-3s, were scrambled to intercept the Germans. The Yugoslavs were quickly engaged by escorting Messerschmitt Bf 109Es from Jagdgeschwader 77 (JG 77). Just as the first wave was departing, Hawker Hurricane Mk1s of the 52nd Fighter Group of the 2nd Fighter Regiment based at Knić arrived over Belgrade and engaged some dive bombers, claiming one Stuka shot down. During the first attack, the Yugoslavs claimed fifteen German aircraft shot down and lost five of their own, with six more badly damaged. The pilots of JG 77 claimed ten Yugoslav machines shot down and another six destroyed on the ground. On his return to base, the commander of the 51st Fighter Group was relieved of his command for failure to take action. The first wave hit the Belgrade power station, the post office including telegraph and postal services, the headquarters of the Ministry of Army and Navy, the Yugoslav Supreme Command building, the military academy, the royal palace at Dedinje, the royal guard barracks at Topčider, the gendarmerie command headquarters, and the airport at Zemun, among other targets.

Immediately after the first wave, King Peter, the Government of Yugoslavia and the Yugoslav Supreme Command left Belgrade and retreated to Yugoslavia's mountainous interior with the intention of going into exile. The second wave of German aircraft arrived over Belgrade about 10:00, consisting of 57 Ju 87 dive bombers and 30 Bf 109E fighters. They were met by 15 of the remaining fighters from the 6th Fighter Brigade. This time the Yugoslavs claimed two dive bombers forced down, and one Bf 109E shot down. A patrol of Bf 109Es from the Yugoslav 31st Fighter Group based at Kragujevac, acting without orders from their group commander, followed the Germans as they returned to their bases and claimed two dive bombers shot down for the loss of both Yugoslav aircraft.

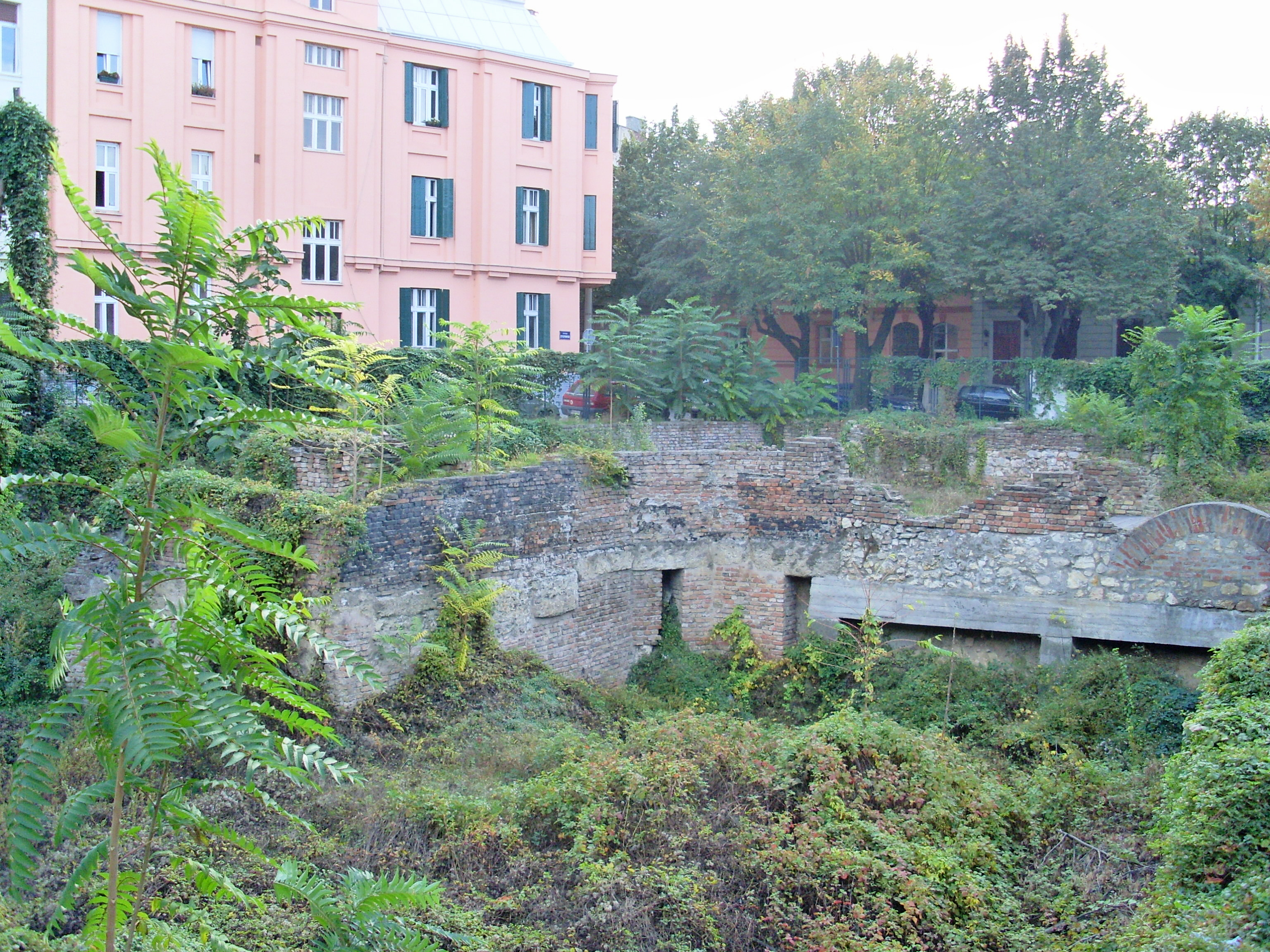
A 2008 photograph of the ruins of the old National Library of Serbia, bombed on 6 April 1941

Belgrade was targeted on two other occasions on the first day of the invasion. The third wave struck at 14:00, consisting of 94 twin-engined bombers flying from airfields near Vienna, escorted by 60 fighters. This wave was met by eighteen fighters of the 6th Fighter Regiment, which claimed four German aircraft. The fourth attack of the day approached Belgrade at 16:00, comprising 97 dive bombers and 60 fighters.

The Germans claimed nineteen Yugoslav Bf 109E fighters and four unidentified aircraft destroyed on 6 April. Actual Yugoslav aircraft losses on the first day were ten shot down and fifteen damaged. The Yugoslavs claimed to have shot down twenty-two German aircraft and forced two others to land. The Germans lost twelve aircraft, significantly fewer than claimed by the Yugoslavs: two Do 17Z light bombers, five Bf 110 heavy fighters, four Ju 87 dive bombers, and one Bf 109E fighter. One Luftwaffe pilot who claimed his first victory over Belgrade on 6 April was Oberleutnant Gerhard Koall of Jagdgeschwader 54. He went on to be credited with 37 victories and was awarded the Knight's Cross of the Iron Cross in 1944.

German bombers and dive-bombers dropped 218–365 tonnes of bombs and incendiaries on the capital. The weak VVKJ and inadequate anti-aircraft defences of Belgrade briefly attempted to meet the overwhelming Luftwaffe assault, but were eliminated as threats during the first wave of the attack. Sources vary regarding the success achieved by the defenders. A US Army study first published in 1953 states that the Luftwaffe lost two fighter aircraft, downed 20 Yugoslav aircraft and destroyed a further 44 on the ground. The military historian Daniel L. Zajac writes that the Germans lost 40 aircraft during the two-day air battle. Another source indicates the loss of 14 German aircraft on 6 April. Dive-bombers in subsequent waves were able to operate at rooftop altitude.

According to the historian Stevan K. Pavlowitch, the bombing of Belgrade lasted three days. Other sources state the air battle over Belgrade lasted only two days owing to poor flying conditions on 8 April. The most important cultural institution that was destroyed was the National Library of Serbia, which was hit by bombs and gutted by fire. Hundreds of thousands of rare books, maps, and medieval manuscripts were destroyed. Also struck was the Belgrade Zoo, sending frightened animals running through the streets.

== British retaliation ==
No. 37 Squadron of the Royal Air Force (RAF) conducted two bombing raids on Sofia, the capital of Bulgaria, in retaliation for the bombing of Belgrade. Operating Vickers Wellington bombers from an airfield in Greece, the squadron conducted raids on 6/7 April and 12/13 April, dropping a total of 30 tonnes of high-explosive bombs on railway targets and nearby residential areas. These raids were carried out despite the fact that Britain was not at war with Bulgaria until 12 December 1941. The historian Herman Knell calls the retaliatory justification for these raids "strange and implausible". The aviation historians Shores, Cull and Malizia indicate that these raids were attacks on the lines of communication of German forces attacking Greece and Yugoslavia, and note that the raid on 6/7 April targeted an ammunition train and other installations in Sofia, and the raid on 12/13 April bombed the railway marshalling yards. Other similar targets in Bulgaria were attacked by the RAF during the Balkans Campaign.

== Aftermath and legacy ==
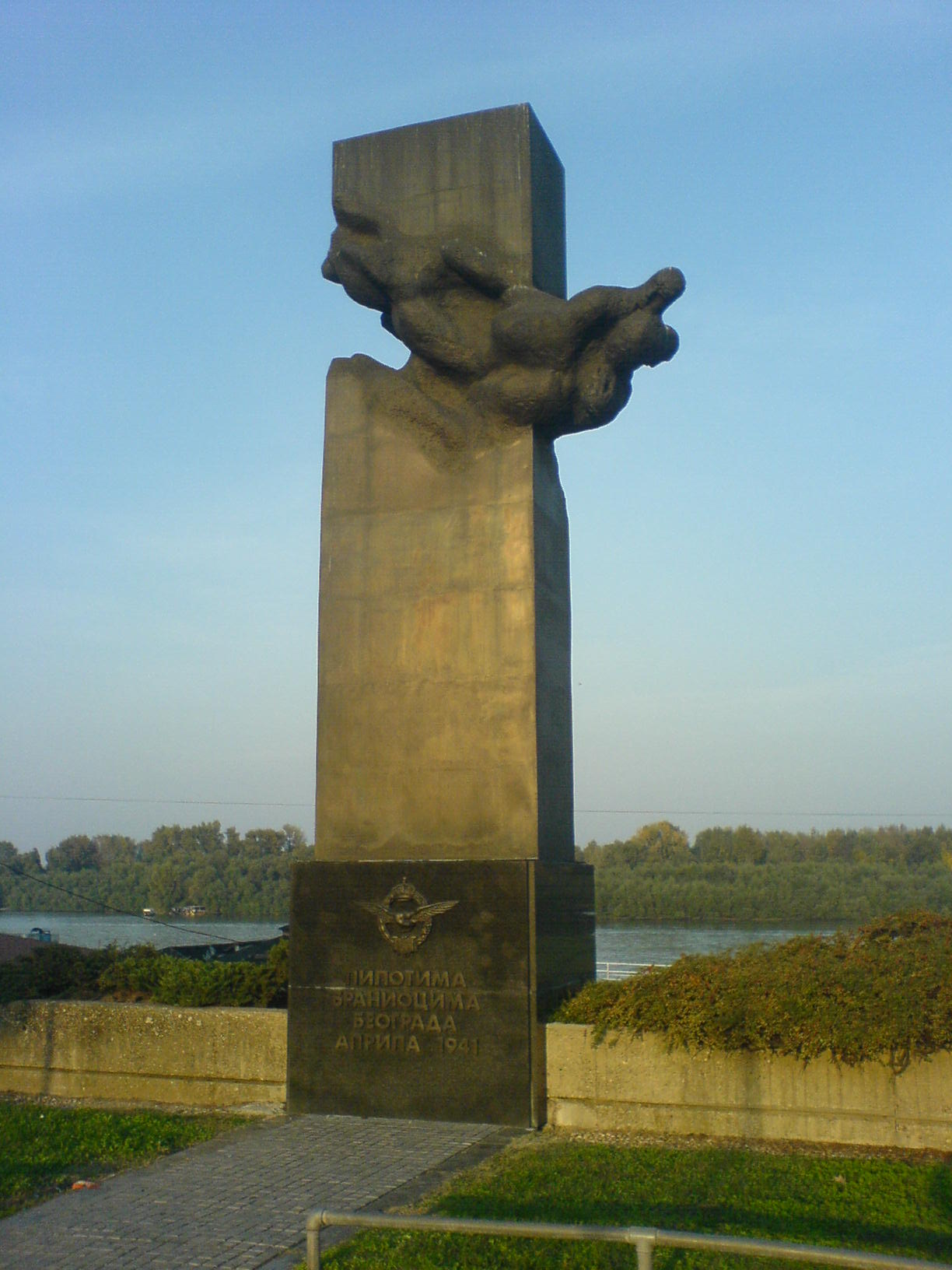
Monument to the Yugoslav pilots killed during Operation Retribution, located in Zemun

The bombing of Belgrade paralysed communications between the Yugoslav military and its headquarters, and contributed decisively to the rapid collapse of Yugoslav resistance. Civilian casualties were significant, but sources vary widely from 1,500 to 17,000 killed. They were worsened by the disclosure of air-raid shelter locations to the Germans in the days preceding the attack. The official casualty figure released by the occupation authorities soon after the bombing was 2,271 killed. Other sources mention 5,000 to 10,000 fatalities, and later Yugoslav estimates ranged even higher. The historian Jozo Tomasevich writes that the higher estimates were downgraded following "careful postwar investigations", and indicates that a figure between 3,000 and 4,000 is more realistic.

Belgrade was occupied on 13 April 1941, and four days later, Yugoslavia capitulated. Afterwards, Luftwaffe engineers conducted a bomb damage assessment in Belgrade. The report stated that 218.5 t (215.0 long tons; 240.9 short tons) of bombs were dropped, 10 to 14 per cent being incendiaries. It listed all the targets of the bombing, mentioned that seven aerial mines were dropped, and that areas in the centre and north-west of the city had been destroyed, comprising 20 to 25 per cent of its total area. Some aspects of the bombing remain unexplained, particularly the use of the aerial mines. Significant damage was done to Belgrade, particularly to the water and electrical systems. Pavlowitch states that almost 50 per cent of housing in Belgrade was destroyed. After the invasion, the Germans forced between 3,500 and 4,000 Jews to collect rubble that was caused by the bombing. Unexploded German bombs continue to be unearthed in the 21st century.

Löhr was captured by the Yugoslav Partisans on 9 May 1945, escaped, and was recaptured on 13 May. He was intensively interrogated, after which he was tried before a Yugoslav military court on war crimes charges, one of which related to his command of Luftflotte IV during Operation Retribution. Löhr was convicted by the Yugoslav military court and sentenced to death. He was executed on 26 February 1947. Following the invasion, Kren was appointed head of the Air Force of the Independent State of Croatia (Croatian: Zrakoplovstvo Nezavisne Države Hrvatske, ZNDH). He was arrested in Italy in March 1947 and extradited to Yugoslavia, where he was tried on unrelated charges of war crimes for his role in the targeting of civilians by the ZNDH. He was found guilty on all counts and executed in 1948.

The bombing of Belgrade was depicted in the 1980 Yugoslav feature film Who's Singin' Over There? (Serbo-Croatian: Ko to tamo peva) and the 1995 feature film Underground (Serbo-Croatian: Podzemlje). It is also the subject of Miodrag Pavlović's poem Belgrade 1941 (Serbo-Croatian: Beograd 1941). The Serbian American poet Charles Simic, a survivor of the bombing, wrote a poem titled "Cameo Appearance" recounting his experiences. A monument commemorating the Yugoslav pilots killed during Operation Retribution was inaugurated in Zemun on 6 April 1997. It was designed by the sculptor Miodrag Živković. On 6 April 2016, the 75th anniversary of the bombing, a memorial service was held for the victims, attended by the Serbian Minister for Labour, Employment, Veteran and Social Policy, Aleksandar Vulin. In June 2017, it was announced that the site containing the ruined foundations of the National Library of Serbia would be made into a memorial garden.
