= F39 =

F39 may refer to:

- Avia F.39, a bomber aircraft of the Czechoslovak Air Force
- BMW X2 (F39), an automobile
- INS Betwa (F39), a Brahmaputra-class guided missile frigate of the Indian Navy
- HMS Naiad (F39), a Leander-class frigate of the Royal Navy
- F-39, Brazilian designation for the Saab JAS 39 Gripen
- F39, an Egyptian hieroglyph
