= Vaška =

- Village
- Location within Croatia
- Coordinates: 45°49′N 17°40′E
- Country: Croatia
- County: Virovitica-Podravina County
- Municipality: Sopje

Area
  - Total: 16.1 km^{2} (6.2 sq mi)

Population (2021)
  - Total: 242
  - Density: 15.0/km^{2} (38.9/sq mi)
- Time zone: UTC+1 (CET)
  - Summer (DST): UTC+2 (CEST)

Vaška is a village in Croatia.

One notable resident was Vladimir Kren, an officer of the Royal Yugoslav Air Force before World War II, who defected to Germany and later was appointed as the commander of the Air Force of the Independent State of Croatia; which was a German puppet state.
