= SAIMAN 200 =

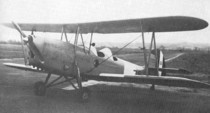

General information
- Type: Two-seat primary trainer
- Manufacturer: Società Industrie Meccaniche Aeronautiche Navali
- Designer: Mario Bottini
- Primary user: Italian Air Force
- Number built: 140

History
- Introduction date: 1940
- First flight: 1938
- Retired: 1947

The SAIMAN 200 was a 1930s Italian two-seat primary trainer designed and built by the Società Industrie Meccaniche Aeronautiche Navali (SAIMAN).

== Development ==
Designed as a basic trainer to meet a requirement for a replacement for the Caproni Ca.100, in competition with the Caproni Ca.164, the first SAIMAN 200 prototype first flew at the end of 1938. It was a wooden conventional biplane with wide track tailwheel landing gear, powered by a nose-mounted 185 hp (138 kW) Alfa-Romeo 115 engine. Two prototypes with 120 hp (74 kW) Alfa-Romeo 110 engines were also built, designated the SAIMAN 205. Two aircraft were sold to the Italian airline Ala Littoria which were followed by three production batches for the Regia Aeronautica. Caproni-Vizzola built 115 aircraft and SAIMAN built 25. Early accidents in use resulted in structural strengthening and modification to the production aircraft.

== Operational history ==
The SAIMAN 200 was used by Regia Aeronautica primary training schools and some were also used for liaison duties. After the 1943 armistice the surviving aircraft were also used by the Italian Co-Belligerent Air Force, the Germans and the Allies.

== Variants ==
SAIMAN 200
Production aircraft with an Alfa Romeo 115 engine, 128 built.
SAIMAN 205
Powered by an Alfa Romeo 110 engine, only two prototypes.

== Operators ==
Croatia

- Air Force of the Independent State of Croatia

(Nazi Germany)

- Luftwaffe

Kingdom of Italy

- Ala Littoria
- Regia Aeronautica
- Italian Co-Belligerent Air Force

Italy

- Italian Air Force

== Specifications ==
Data from

General characteristics

- Crew: two
- Length: 7.47 m (24 ft 6 in)
- Wingspan: 8.78 m (28 ft 9.75 in)
- Height: 2.50 m (8 ft 2.5 in)
- Wing area: 22 m^{2} (236.81 sq ft)
- Empty weight: 761 kg (1,678 lb)
- Gross weight: 1,055 kg (2,326 lb)
- Powerplant: 1 × Alfa Romeo 115 inline piston engine , 138 kW (185 hp)

Performance

- Maximum speed: 220 km/h (137 mph, 119 kn)
- Range: 475 km (295 mi, 256 nmi)
- Service ceiling: 6,000 m (19,685 ft)
- Time to altitude: 13.5 min to 3,000 m (9,800 ft)

== See also ==
Aircraft of comparable role, configuration, and era

- de Havilland Tiger Moth
- Stampe SV.4
