= Vladimir Kren =

Croatian general (1903–1948)

General Vladimir Kren
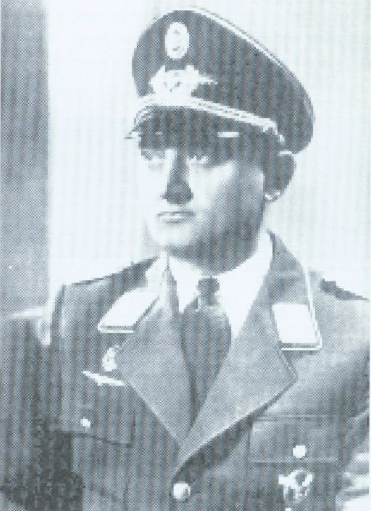
- Born: Vladimir Kren; 8 December 1903; Vaška, Croatia-Slavonia, Austria-Hungary
- Died: 2 December 1948 (aged 44); Zagreb, PR Croatia, Yugoslavia
- Cause of death: Execution by firing squad
- Military career
- Allegiance: Yugoslavia (1922–1941) Independent State of Croatia (1941–1945)
- Branch: Royal Yugoslav Army; Royal Yugoslav Air Force Air Force of the Independent State of Croatia
- Service years: 1922–1945
- Rank: (Kingdom of Yugoslavia) Major (Independent State of Croatia) Major General
- Commands: Croatian Air Force
- Conflicts: World War II

Vladimir Kren (8 December 1903 – 2 December 1948) was a Croatian major general and commander of the Air Force of the Independent State of Croatia (ZNDH) during World War II. He was an officer in the Royal Yugoslav Air Force (VVKJ) before the war. In April 1941, he defected to Nazi Germany and handed over the locations of many of the VVKJ's dispersal airfields and exposed many of its codes. This made it easier for the Luftwaffe to destroy the VVKJ during the Axis invasion of Yugoslavia, which began shortly after Kren's defection.

Kren was named the commander of the ZNDH upon returning to Zagreb in mid-April 1941 and served in this capacity until September 1943, when he voluntarily retired. In June 1944, Croatian leader Ante Pavelić ordered that Kren be returned to active service within the ZNDH and had him re-appointed as its commander.

In May 1945, Kren fled to Italy via Austria and was arrested by Allied forces. He escaped from Allied custody in early 1947, but was arrested by British forces that March while trying to board a ship bound for Argentina. He was extradited to Yugoslavia and put on trial in Zagreb, found guilty of various offences, and sentenced to death by firing squad. He was executed in December 1948.

== Early life ==
Vladimir Kren was born on 8 December 1903 in the village of Vaška, near Podravska Slatina. He attended the Military Academy in Belgrade. He served as an infantry officer in the Royal Yugoslav Army then transferred to serve with the Royal Yugoslav Air Force (Serbo-Croatian: Vazduhoplovstvo Vojske Kraljevine Jugoslavije, VVKJ). Before the outbreak of World War II, he was promoted to captain in the Royal Yugoslav Army and served as a battalion commander at Zagreb Airport.

== World War II ==
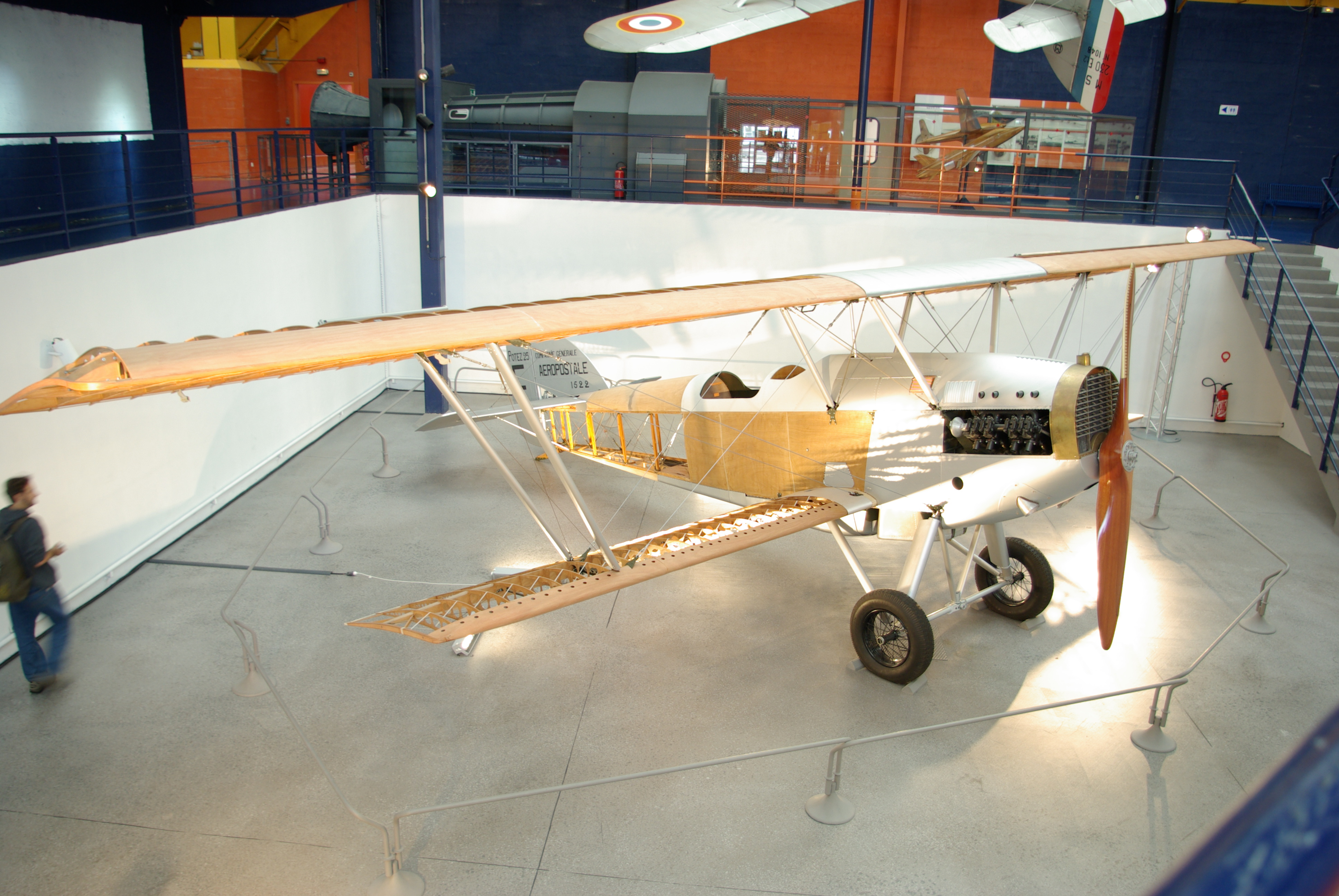
A Potez 25 biplane, similar to the one that Kren used during his defection in April 1941

Kren began communicating with Ustaše leader Slavko Kvaternik during the winter of 1940–41, and became a full member of the Ustaše in February 1941. That month, he and five other Croat officers of the Royal Yugoslav Army signed a memorandum in which they pledged loyalty to "the great German people and the great German Führer".

On 3 April, Kren flew a Potez 25 aircraft to Graz and defected to the Germans. He declared himself as a member of the Ustaše and handed over the locations of many of the VVKJ's dispersal airfields as well as codes used by the VVKJ, which had to be quickly changed. (Note: Some accounts contend that he merely travelled to Graz in order to plead with the Germans to spare Zagreb from aerial bombardment by the Luftwaffe.)

Kren's actions directly led to the swift destruction of the VVKJ by the Luftwaffe during the Axis invasion of Yugoslavia. (Note: Author Uki Goñi alleges that Kren personally directed German aircraft to bomb specific targets during Operation Retribution.) Nevertheless, the Germans detained Kren and held him until 11 April. He returned to Zagreb not long after he was set free. There, he was promoted to colonel and named commander of the Air Force of the Independent State of Croatia (Croatian: Zrakoplovstvo Nezavisne Države Hrvatske, ZNDH). He was promoted to general shortly afterwards. Later that year, he accompanied Croatian leader Ante Pavelić on an official visit to Berlin.

Kren was retired from the ZNDH at his own request on 13 September 1943. Pavelić subsequently transferred him to serve as an officer within his personal bodyguard. (Note: Pavelić's personal bodyguard was known as Poglavnikova tjelesna bojna (or PTB) in Croatian.) In mid-1944, Kren served as a mediator between the ZNDH and Croatian politicians Mladen Lorković and Ante Vokić, the main conspirators behind the failed Lorković–Vokić plot. In June 1944, Pavelić ordered that Kren be returned to active service within the ZNDH and had him re-appointed as its commander. As commander, Kren visited an academy for young ZNDH pilots in Italy and toured Bulgaria, Germany, and the Eastern Front. During his stay in Germany, he negotiated the sale of German aircraft to the NDH and was granted access to several facilities that were used to manufacture the V-1 flying bomb and the V-2 rocket.

== Death ==
At the beginning of May 1945, Kren left Zagreb. He evaded capture by the Yugoslav Partisans and escaped across the border into Italy. He was captured by the Allied forces there and placed in a prisoner-of-war camp in Grumo Appula, near Bari. He was then transferred to a camp in Grottaglie, where he remained until 1947. That year, Kren escaped from Allied custody while being transported to another prisoner-of-war camp. Kren went to Rome, where he hid for a few months. In March 1947, British intelligence discovered that Kren was staying in Genoa under the protection of Monsignor Karlo Petranović and that he was planning to leave for Argentina under the alias Marko Rubini. Kren was arrested by British authorities on 4 March 1947 while attempting to board a ship called Philippa, which regularly carried suspected Croatian war criminals along the Genoa–Buenos Aires route. Eight other suspected war criminals were arrested alongside him.

Kren was extradited to Yugoslavia later in March. He was tried in Zagreb, and on 22 October 1948 the city's municipal court found him guilty of mass murder, terrorism, forced mobilization, forced religious conversion, aerial bombardment of civilian areas, and the forced expulsion of civilians. He was sentenced to death by firing squad. Kren appealed the decision to the supreme court of the Socialist Republic of Croatia, but his appeal was dismissed on 9 November 1948. He was executed in Zagreb on 2 December 1948.

In 2011, his granddaughter submitted an unsuccessful request for rehabilitation to the Zagreb District court.

== Bibliography ==
- Dizdar, Zdravko; Grčić, Marko; Ravlić, Slaven; Stuparić, Darko (1997). Tko je tko u NDH (in Croatian). Zagreb, Croatia: Minerva. ISBN 978-953-6377-03-9.
- Goñi, Uki (2003). The Real Odessa: How Perón Brought the Nazi War Criminals to Argentina (2nd ed.). London, England: Granta Books. ISBN 978-1-86207-552-8.
- Neulen, H. W. (2000). In the Skies of Europe: Air Forces Allied to the Luftwaffe, 1939–1945. Wiltshire, England: Crowood Press. ISBN 978-1-86126-326-1.
- "Sud odbio rehabilitaciju šefa ustaškog zrakoplovstva i zločinca Vladimira Krena". Novi List (in Croatian). 7 September 2011. Archived from the original on 5 May 2012.
- Shores, Christopher F.; Cull, Brian; Malizia, Nicola (1987). Air War for Yugoslavia, Greece, and Crete, 1940–41. London, England: Grub Street. ISBN 978-0-948817-07-6.
