= Fokker F.IX =

Airplane

F.IX
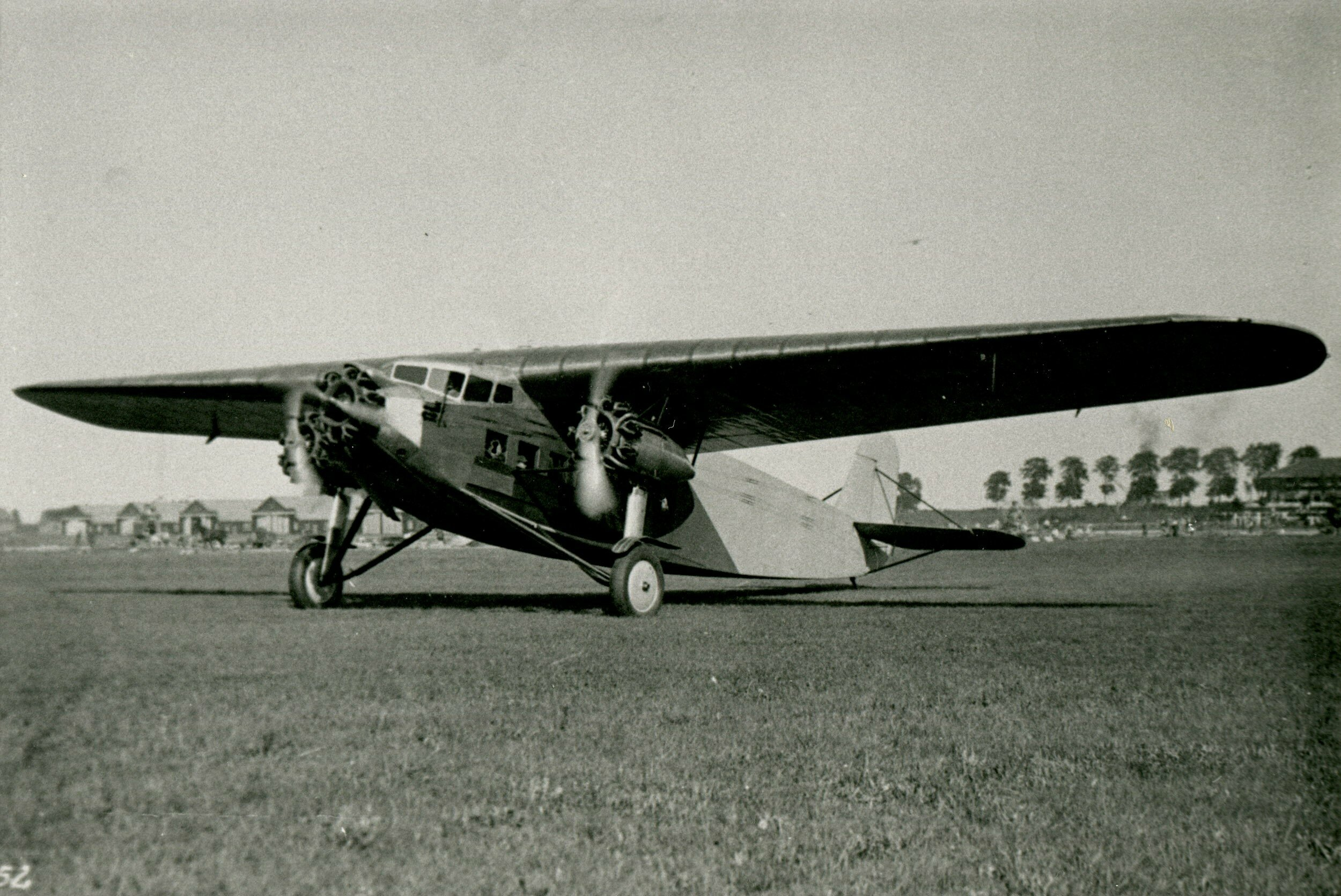

General information
- Type: Airliner
- Manufacturer: Fokker; Avia (under licence)
- Primary users: Czechoslovak Air Force KLM; ČSA; ZNDH
- Number built: 18

History
- First flight: 23 August 1929

The Fokker F.IX was an airliner developed in the Netherlands in the late 1920s, intended to provide KLM with an aircraft suitable for regular services to the Dutch East Indies. When the onset of the Great Depression forced the postponement of those plans, the market for this aircraft disappeared as well, although it did see military service in Czechoslovakia as a bomber.

== Design and development ==
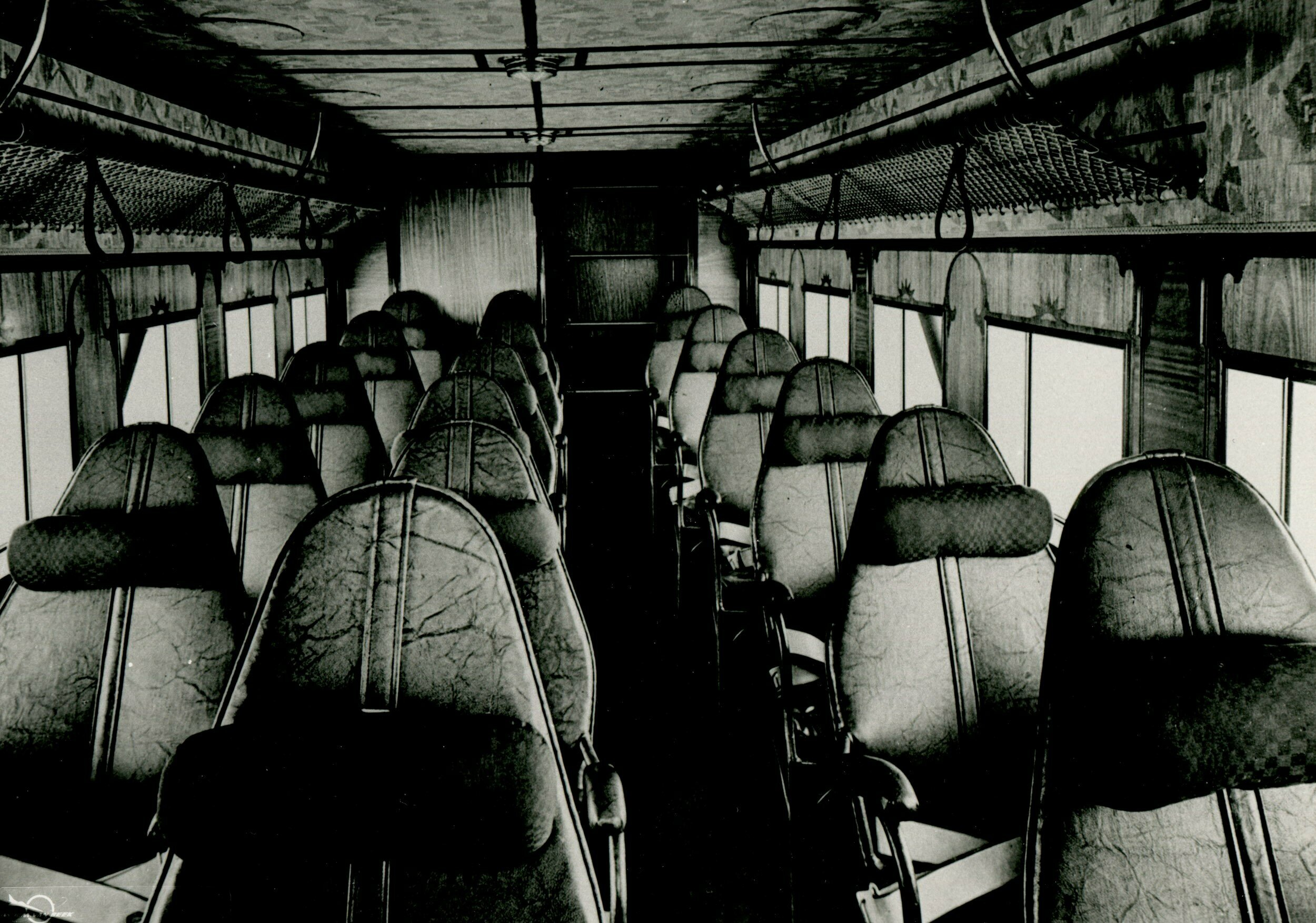
Passenger cabin in the F.IX

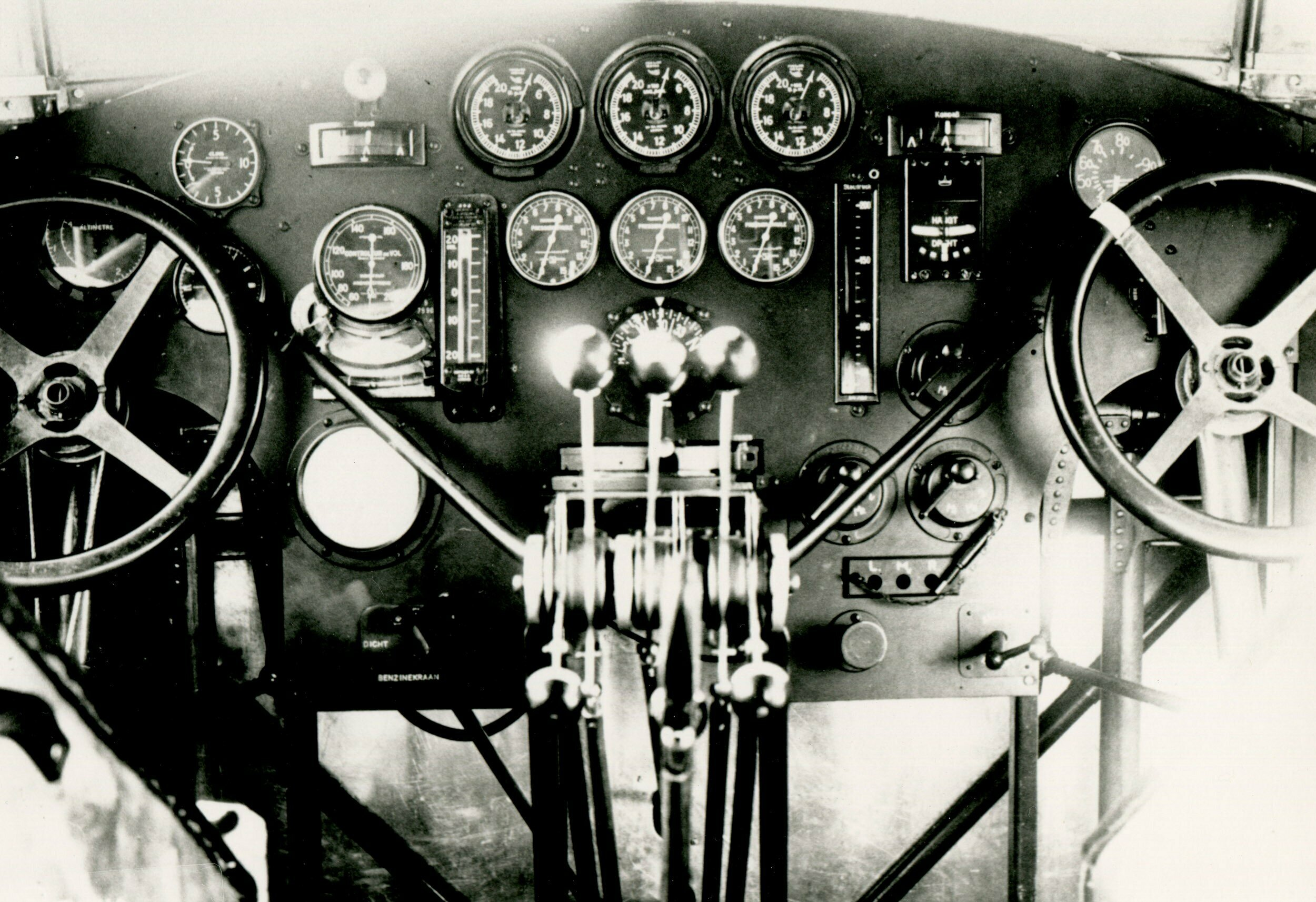
F.IX cockpit

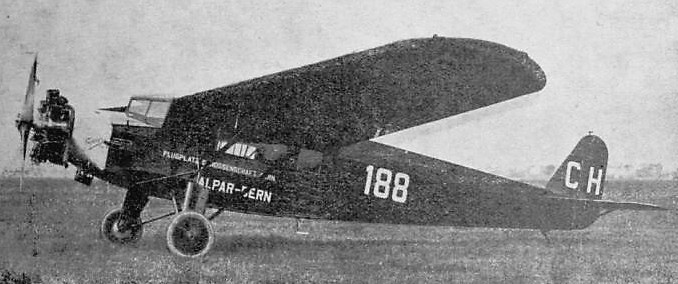
Fokker F.IX

In the late 1920s, the Dutch airline KLM set out to develop commercial air services between Amsterdam and the Netherlands East Indies, and while the Fokker F.VII allowed it to operate an air mail service, a larger aircraft was wanted for passenger services. To meet this requirement, Fokker designed the F.IX, Fokker's largest three-engined monoplane, with KLM placing an order for Fokker's new design on 5 September 1928. The F.IX followed Fokker's normal layout for commercial aircraft, and was a high-wing cantilever monoplane with a fixed tailskid undercarriage. The wings were made of wood, and the fuselage was welded steel tube with a fabric covering. The two pilots sat side-by-side in an enclosed cockpit, while the first aircraft's passenger cabin had seats for up to 18 passengers when operating on European services, although only four–six passengers would be carried on the Far-East route. The first example, registration PH-AGA, powered by three Gnome-Rhône Jupiter radial engines rated at 480–500 hp (360–370 kW), made its maiden flight on 26 August 1929.

A second example, registration PH-AFK, was ordered by KLM in May 1930. It had a longer nose compared with the first example, and a larger cabin which allowed up to 20 passengers to be carried. PH-AFK was exhibited at the 1930 Paris Air Show where it won the Grand Prix de Comfort et d'Elegance d'Avions de Transport, the "beauty prize" as voted by the public.

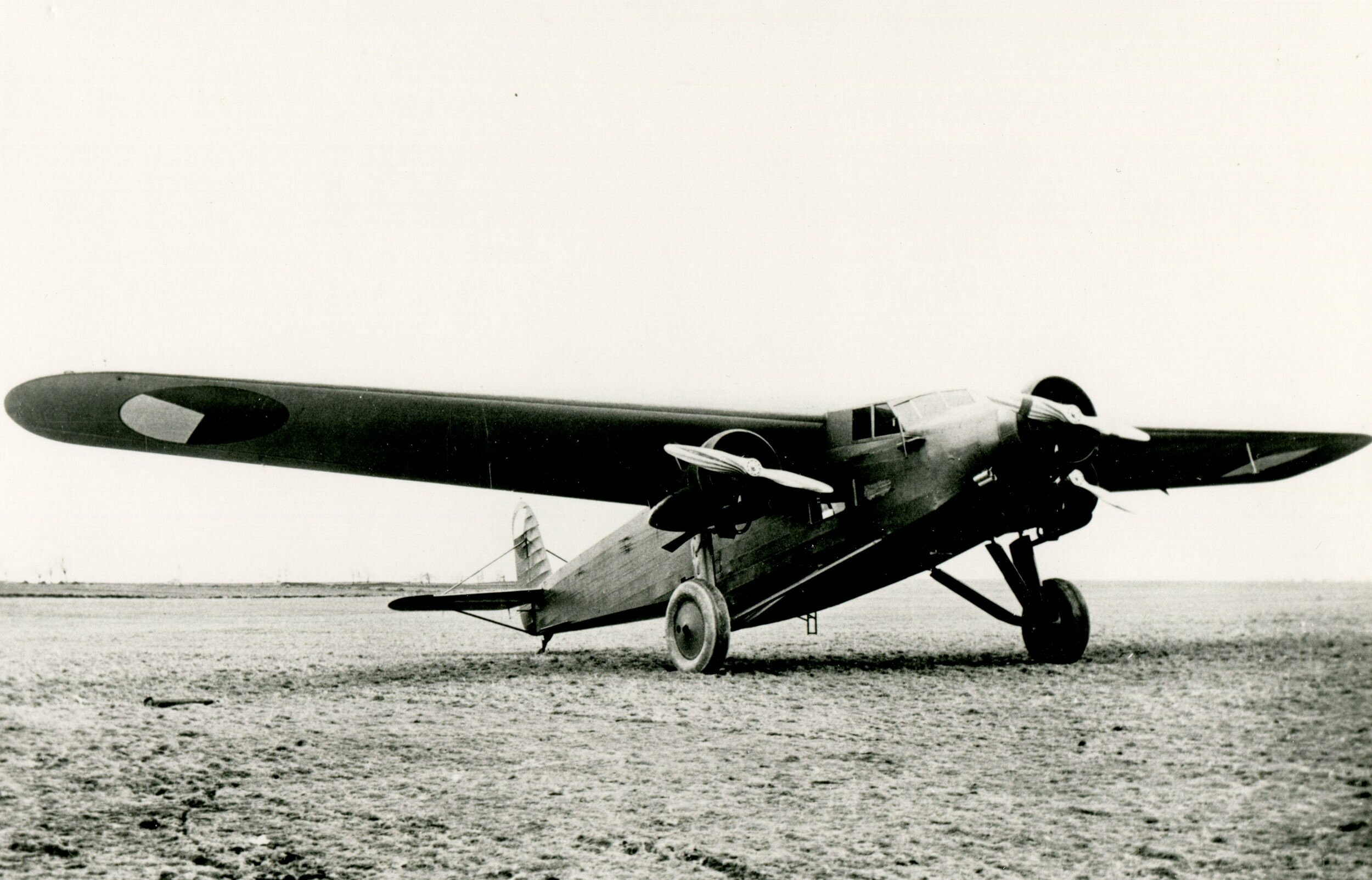
The Czechoslovak Avia F.39 bomber

Czech aircraft manufacturer Avia purchased a licence to produce the type in order to create a bomber for the Czechoslovak Air Force, when it was decided that the Fokker F.VII that Avia was already producing under licence was too small for this role. By 1932, 12 were in service as the F.39. Yugoslavia also purchased two aircraft, as well as a licence to produce the type domestically, although this did not occur. The F.39s differed from their civil counterparts not only by the addition of bomb racks, but also with a defensive machine gun being fitted to either a ventral "step" or a turret. Avia also built two examples as airliners for Czechoslovak Airlines as the F.IX D (Dopravní = 'transport'). One of these survived into World War II, when it was impressed into Luftwaffe service (as TF+BO).

A further proposed military development by Avia, the twin-engine F.139, never left the drawing board.

== Operational history ==
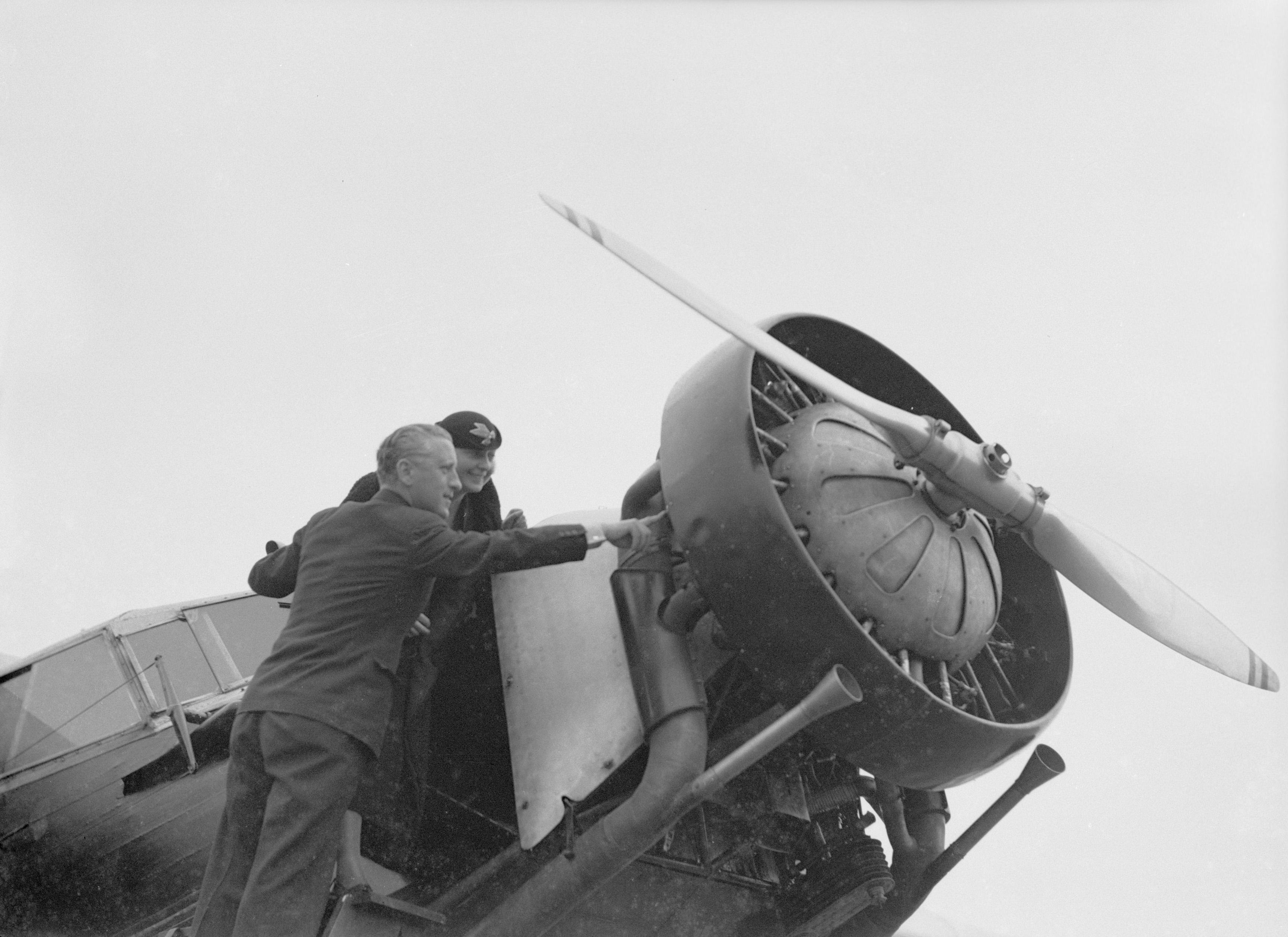
Nose of a Fokker F.IX, 1934

Even though KLM directors had been talking in terms of ten or more aircraft in 1929, the worsening economic climate resulted in only two being purchased. Due to the logistics implications of stocking spare parts for only two aircraft, these were confined to European routes and the two F.IXs each made only one flight to the Indies. One (registration PH-AFK) was written off in a crash on 4 August 1931, and the other (De Adelaar, PH-AGA) was retired in 1936, and was subsequently acquired by clandestine means to serve as a bomber in the Spanish Republican Air Force during the civil war.

== Variants ==
=== Fokker ===
F-IX
Three-engined passenger airliner for KLM.

=== Avia ===
F.39
Three-engined bomber aircraft for the Czechoslovak Air Force.
F.139
Proposed twin-engined version of the F.39. Not built.
F-IX D
Three-engined passenger airliner for Czechoslovak Airlines.

== Operators ==
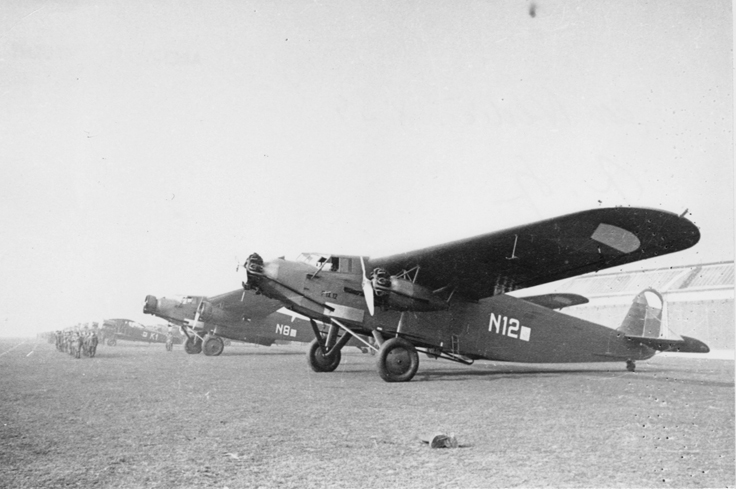
Row of Avia Fokker F.IX

Independent State of Croatia

- Zrakoplovstvo Nezavisne Države Hrvatske

Czechoslovakia

- Czechoslovak Airlines operated two aircraft.
- Czechoslovak Air Force

Germany

- Luftwaffe operated one captured aircraft.

Netherlands

- KLM operated two aircraft.

Spain

- Spanish Republican Air Force

Kingdom of Yugoslavia

- Yugoslav Royal Air Force

== Accidents and incidents ==
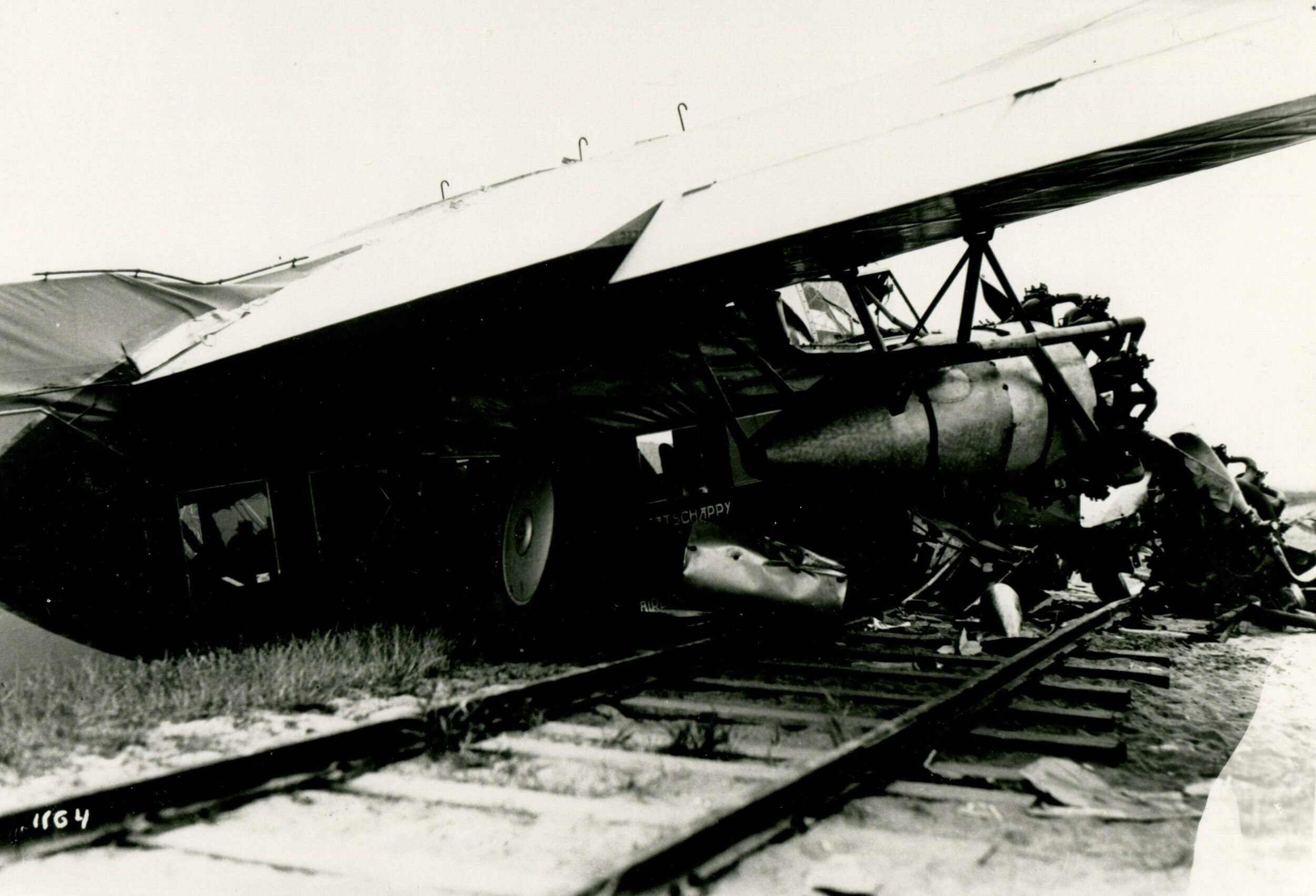
The only aircraft lost to an accident in 1931 (registration PH-AFK), having suffered an engine failure on take-off; all passengers and crew survived.

- On August 4, 1931, a KLM F.IX crashed on takeoff from Waalhaven Airport due to engine failure; all 15 passengers and crew survived, but the aircraft was written off.

== Specifications (Fokker F.IX) ==
General characteristics

- Crew: two (pilot and co-pilot)
- Capacity: 20 passengers
- Length: 19.31 m (63 ft 6.75 in)
- Wingspan: 27.16 m (89 ft 0.5 in)
- Height: 4.572 m (15 ft 8.75 in)
- Empty weight: 5,450 kg (12,015 lb)
- Max takeoff weight: 9,000 kg (19,842 lb)
- Powerplant: 3 × Gnome-Rhône 9A Jupiter 9-cyl. air-cooled radial piston engines, 360 kW (480 hp) each

Performance

- Maximum speed: 210 km/h (130 mph, 110 kn)
- Cruise speed: 172 km/h (107 mph, 93 kn)
- Range: 1,150 km (710 mi, 620 nmi)

== Bibliography ==
- Howson, Gerald (August–November 1980). "Fokker's Trimotors Go to War". Air Enthusiast. No. 13. pp. 43–49. ISSN 0143-5450.
- Stroud, John (1966). European Transport Aircraft since 1910. London: Putnam.
- Stroud, John (November 1985). "Wings of Peace". Aeroplane Monthly. Vol. 13, no. 11. pp. 600–605. ISSN 0143-7240.
- Taylor, John W. R., and Jean Alexander.Combat Aircraft of the World. New York: G.P. Putnam's Sons, 1969. ISBN 0-71810-564-8.
- Taylor, Michael J. H. Jane's Encyclopedia of Aviation. London: Studio Editions, 1989.
- Weale, Elke. Combat Aircraft of World War II. Simsbury, Connecticut: Bracken Books, 1985.
