= Air Force of the Independent State of Croatia =

WW2 military service branch

- Zrakoplovstvo Nezavisne Države Hrvatske
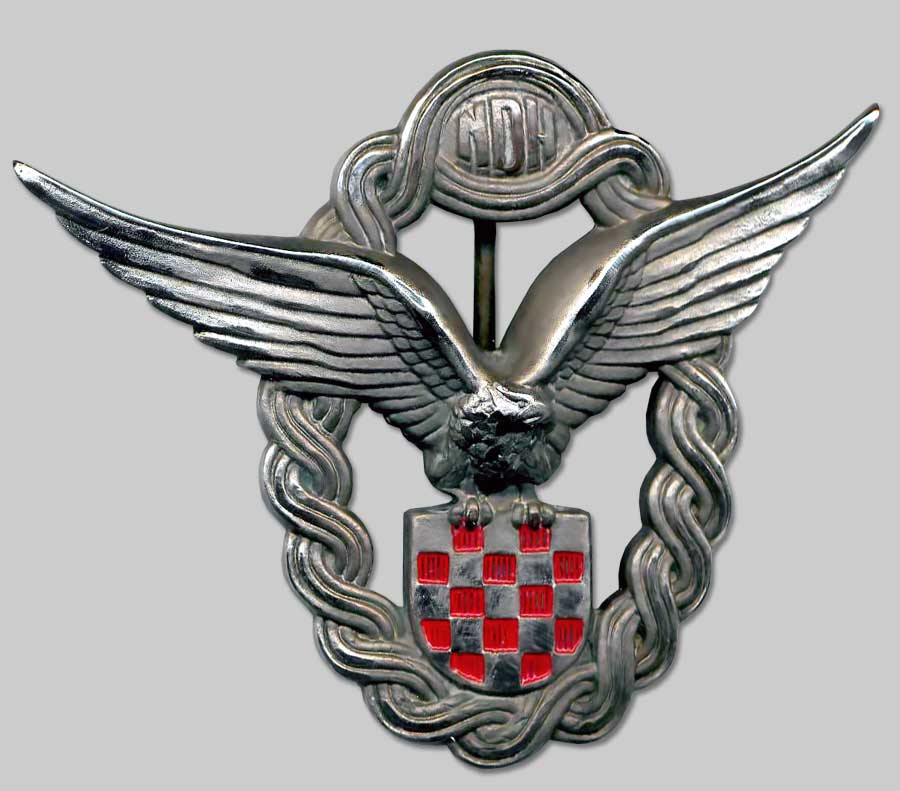
- Air Force badge
- Active: 1941–1945
- Country: Croatia
- Type: Air force
- Role: Aerial warfare
- Engagements: World War II

Insignia
- Flag (1941–1945)

- Roundel and fin flash (1941–1944)

- Roundel (1944–1945)

- Fin flash (1944–1945)

Aircraft flown
- Attack: Rogožarski PVT, Rogožarski R-100, Breguet XIX
- Bomber: Savoia-Marchetti SM.79, Dornier Do 17, Bristol Blenheim I, CANT Z.1007, Avia Fokker F.39
- Fighter: Ikarus IK-2, Fiat G.50, Morane-Saulnier M.S.406, Messerschmitt Bf 109, Macchi C.202
- Patrol: Caproni Ca.310, Caproni Ca.311, Breguet XIX, Potez XXV
- Trainer: Potez XXV, Bücker Bü 131, Bücker Bü 133, Saiman 200, AVIA FL.3
- Transport: Avia Fokker F.VII, Avia Fokker F.IX, Junkers W 34, Savoia-Marchetti SM.82, Airspeed Envoy

The Air Force of the Independent State of Croatia (Croatian: Zrakoplovstvo Nezavisne Države Hrvatske; ZNDH), was the air force of the Independent State of Croatia (NDH), a puppet state established with the support of the Axis powers on the territory of the Kingdom of Yugoslavia during World War II. The ZNDH was founded under German authority in April 1941, following the German-led Axis invasion of Yugoslavia.

Although it could not be considered a large air arm in the wider context of World War II, the ZNDH nonetheless had on its charge at one time or another some 650 aircraft between April 1941 and May 1945, as well as anti-aircraft and paratroop units. From humble beginnings in 1941, the ZNDH was still providing some measure of air-support (fighter, attack and transport) until the last days of World War II in Europe.

The ZNDH maintained a flying training school equipped with gliders and trainers, originally at Rajlovac airfield near Sarajevo and then at Velika Gorica and Pleso airfields in Zagreb. Its parachute and paratroop school was located in Koprivnica.

== History ==
=== Establishment ===
The ZNDH came into being as early as 19 April 1941, just nine days after the proclamation of the NDH. Its commander was Colonel Vladimir Kren, a former captain of the Royal Yugoslav Air Force (Serbo-Croatian: Vazduhoplovstvo Vojske Kraljevine Jugoslavije; VVKJ), who had defected to the Germans in Graz in his Potez 25 on 4 April 1941 and declared himself an Ustaše supporter.

The first task of the new air force, the backbone of which was provided by 500 former VVKJ officers and 1,600 NCOs, was the acquisition or salvage of aircraft, weapons, machinery, equipment and fuel that had survived the fighting and had not been confiscated by the German or Italian forces.

Following the brief April War, the Germans had captured over 300 ex-VVKJ aircraft. They considered them to be of little use for the Luftwaffe, so it was decided to equip the ZNDH with an appropriate number of these aircraft. These aircraft, scattered in every corner of Yugoslavia, were then collected, minor damage repaired and stocks of fuel and spare parts stored at airfield workshops. Naturally, the majority of the aircraft were more or less damaged and action was undertaken to repair as many of them as possible. Former VVKJ pilots of Croatian background and other personnel of aeronautical specialty were approached and offered instant rehabilitation (most of them were in German POW camps), jobs and safety for their families.

Kren also initiated the formation of an early warning system, anti-aircraft batteries (armed with German and Czech weapons) and various training and servicing departments, ammunition stores and workshop facilities. The fuel necessary for the operations of the ZNDH was supplied by the Germans from former Yugoslav stocks in Kraljevo, Serbia.

As early as May 1941, the NDH had asked Germany for, among other things, 22 Messerschmitt Bf 109s. Instead, they got some of the remaining largely obsolete aircraft of the VVKJ. At the same time, Germany appropriated six captured Dornier Do 17K bombers, which were then supplied to Bulgaria. Romania received six ex-VVKJ Hawker Hurricanes, as well as six Bristol Blenheims, whilst Finland received 20 half-completed Blenheims, together with manufacturing tools and production equipment, as well as a huge variety of spare parts.

During the middle part of 1941, some of the ZNDH's man-power capacity (one fighter squadron and one medium bomber squadron) was sent to the Eastern Front as part of the Luftwaffe, the Croatian Air Force Legion (Croatian: Hrvatska Zrakoplovna Legija; HZL; German: Kroatische Luftwaffen Legion). Most of the Croatian Air Force Legion's personnel were back on NDH territory by late 1942 (bomber squadron)/early 1944 (fighter squadron) to help counter the growing Allied air threat.

The personnel of the ZNDH took over and re-activated the airfields at Zagreb, Sarajevo, Mostar, Banja Luka and Zemun, where the Ikarus and Zmaj aircraft plants were located. By June 1941, the Germans had begun to pass on to the ZNDH various captured VVKJ aircraft, including eight Bristol Blenheim I and five Potez 25 bombers. These and most of the 211 ex-VVKJ aircraft received by the ZNDH had first to be repaired and/or overhauled at the Ikarus plant in Zemun.

=== The first missions: 1941 ===
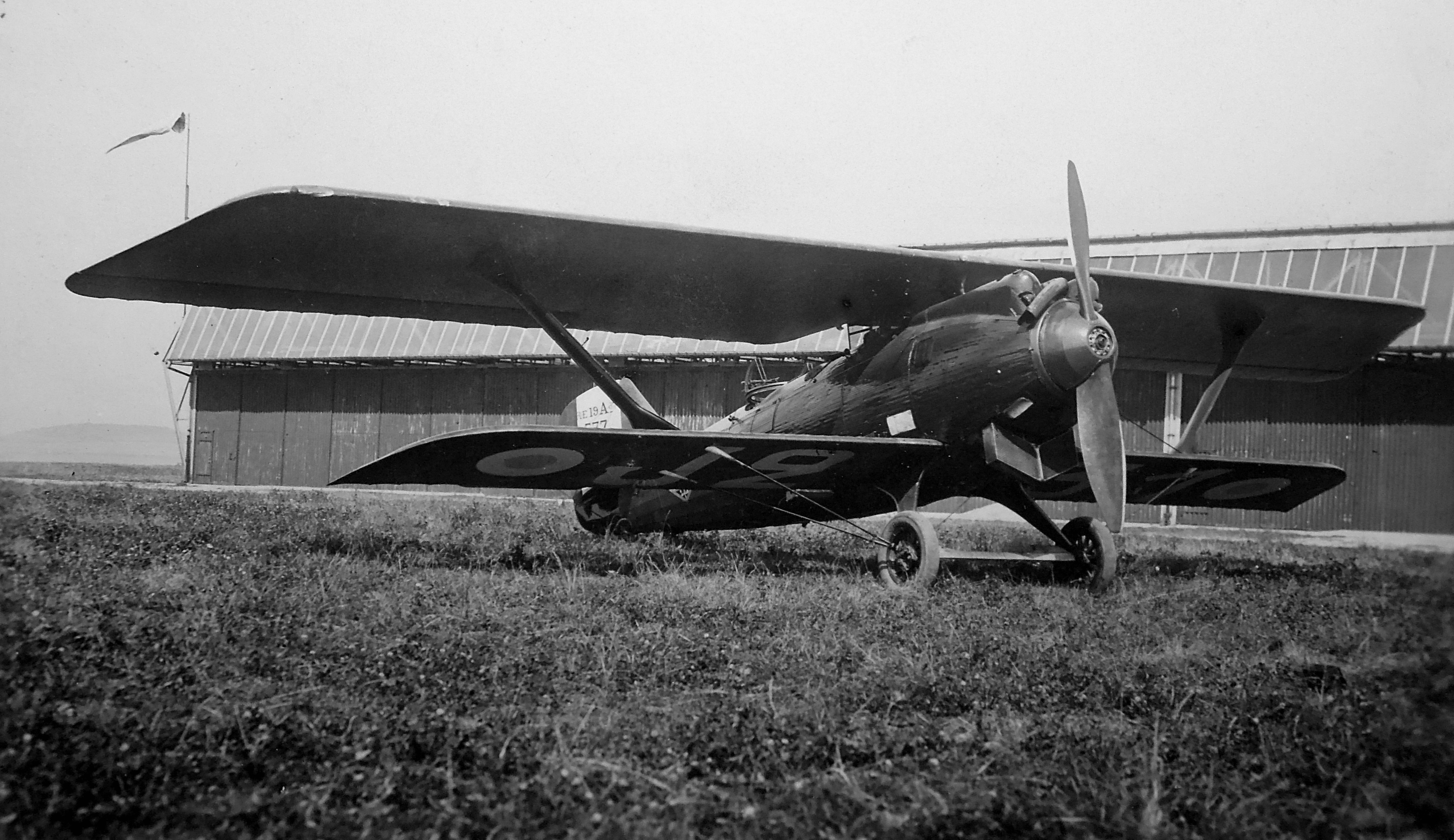
The Breguet 19 was a French designed aircraft built under licence in Yugoslavia for the Royal Yugoslav Air Force. The ZNDH made use of some 50 captured Breguets for attack, re-supply and reconnaissance missions against the Yugoslav Partisans.

In late 1941 the ZNDH had 95 aircraft distributed in four groups and eight squadrons. Fighting the Yugoslav Partisans from the air had begun already in late June 1941, when Breguet 19 and Potez 25 bombers had proved most suitable. The Breguets could carry a bomb load of up to 400 kilograms (880 lb) using 24 12-kilogram (26 lb) bombs, whilst the Potez 25s could carry about half that amount. Both types were also armed with three 7.7-millimetre (0.30 in) machine guns. Altogether the ZNDH eventually came to possess 50 Breguet 19s and 45 Potez 25s. The operational use of these light bombers was not limited to fighting the Partisans; the aircraft were also used to supply isolated or surrounded army strong points.

The emblem of the ZNDH was to be the red and white chequerboard insignia, (Croatian: Šahovnica), derived from the Croat coat of arms, dating back to the 10th century, carried on the fin. In January 1945 this was replaced by the black and white trefoil cross of King Zvonimir.

As well as the Breguet and Potez aircraft, which were the most numerous types in the ZNDH inventory, Zmaj Fizir FP-2 light biplane trainers were also converted to carry six 12 kilograms (26 lb) bombs. These aircraft were used to bomb and strafe Partisan troops and positions in northern Bosnia but they also faced anti-aircraft fire. The first missions cost the ZNDH a Breguet and a Potez aircraft, both of which crash landed after being hit by Partisan ground fire. The ZNDH crews had little chance of survival after being hit, as flying suits, helmets and parachutes were not available at the time – hence their desperate crash-landings.

Similar actions continued throughout 1941. The ZNDH flew many missions in support of Army troops in limited scale operations against the Partisans mostly over eastern and western Bosnia, as well as over other parts of the NDH. By September, the ZNDH introduced larger aircraft for bombing Partisan forces and territory. Two bombers, an Avia Fokker F.IX derived F.39 and a Savoia-Marchetti SM.79 were available for operations and had the added advantage of being able to carry 100-kilogram (220 lb) bombs. They were extensively used for bombing villages and road communications. However it was soon established that the vintage biplane Breguet 19 and Potez 25 aircraft were ideally suited for missions against Partisan troop concentrations. Although they were outdated and certainly their use would be out of the question on any other front, their performance and armament made them very dangerous for an ill-armed enemy. The Partisans were scattered in villages, forests and mountains and their positions could only be detected by a slow moving aircraft. Visual reconnaissance missions using hand-held cameras were also flown. Aerial reconnaissance supplied the army with vital data about Partisan movements and positions and about the situation in Partisan territory in general. This was all the more important because the army desperately lacked radio equipment of all kinds. Light aircraft were frequently used for liaison duties, particularly connecting the surrounding army garrisons and higher command. Often the Army requested one or two aircraft to be temporarily attached to particular army units to closely co-operate with ground troops.

The ZNDH's fighter force was poorly equipped in every respect, consisting of 12 ex-VVKJ machines including four Ikarus IK-2s, seven ancient Avia BH-33 Es and one Hawker Fury II. Fortunately for this ill-equipped force, there was no aerial opposition and some more modern fighter aircraft were received from 1942 onwards.

Colder October and November weather limited aerial activities over the NDH. The Partisan operations spread to eastern Serbian territory and the squadrons based at Sarajevo airfield made their appearance on the Bosnian-Serbian border area. The Partisans were trying to secure and expand their territory in the eastern part of Yugoslavia, which they had liberated in the autumn of 1941. The ZNDH flew daily supply missions with their Avia Fokker F.39 and due to the lack of other aircraft also used the venerable Breguets and Potez. These could land on hastily prepared strips and performed very well in airlifting supplies to the surrounded garrison of Višegrad.

=== Expansion: 1942 ===
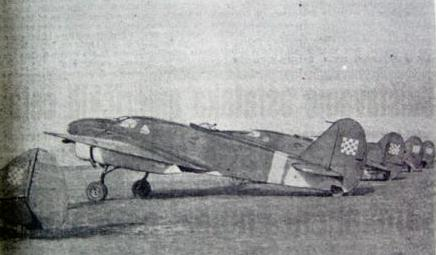
Line-up of ZNDH Caproni Ca.310 light bombers at Zagreb's Borongaj airfield, 1942.

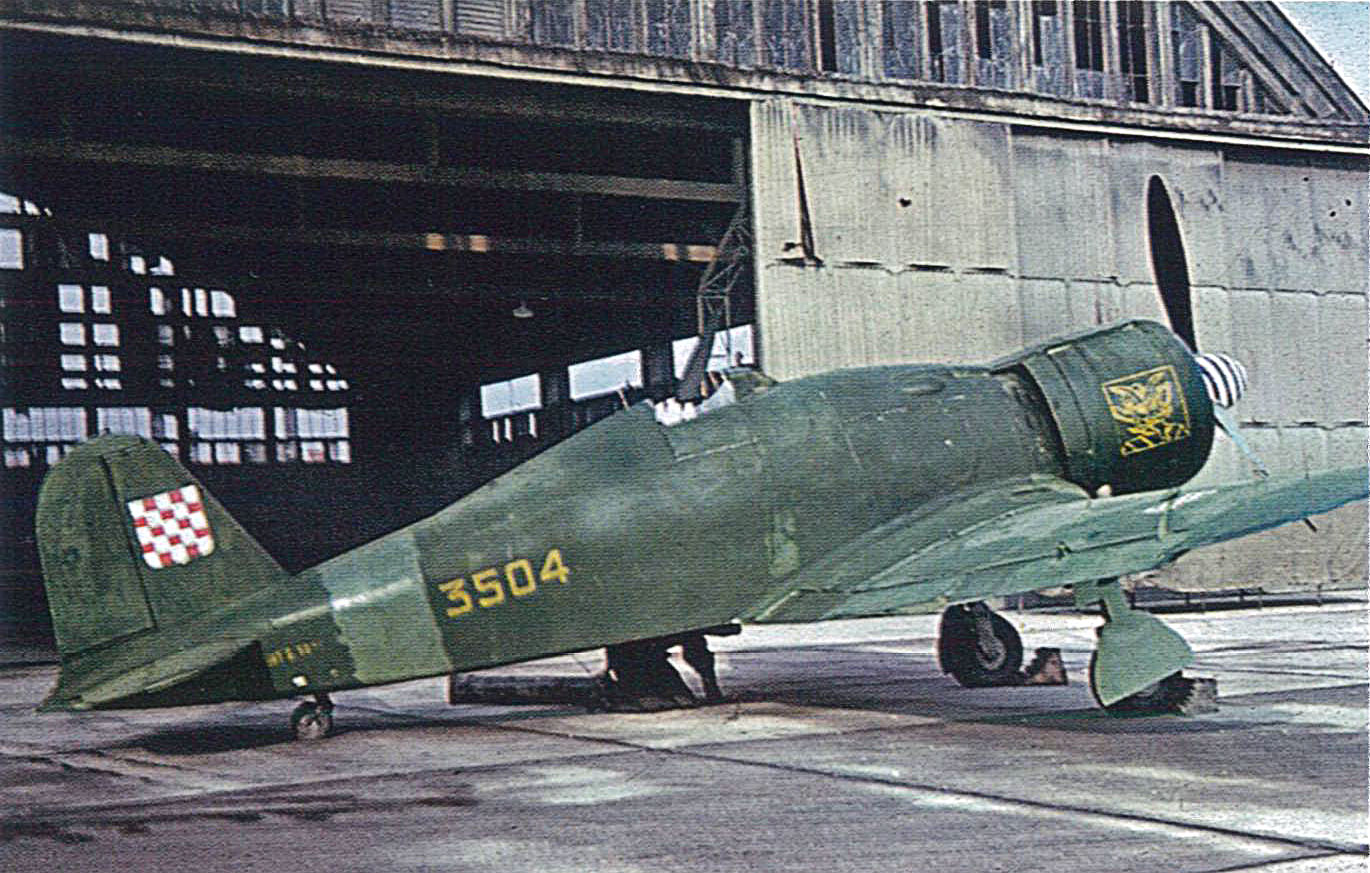
The Italian designed and built Fiat G.50 was the first relatively modern fighter aircraft available to the ZNDH in reasonable numbers. Some were still in service in 1945.

In 1942, fighting with the Partisans intensified. Not only had they liberated a substantial territory in the eastern part of Yugoslavia, but they encouraged rebellion all over the country. The German, Italian and NDH governments were aware of this danger and they used every means available to destroy the Partisan forces. They planned several large-scale operations for this purpose in which air support played a very important role.

The first half of 1942 was marked by several deliveries of new or refurbished aircraft from Germany and Italy, aside from those received from Ikarus in Zemun. First of all the ZNDH received 10 brand new Caproni Ca.311 M medium bombers from Italy. These aircraft had been ordered and paid for by the Yugoslav Government for service in the VVKJ, but the Axis invasion of Yugoslavia prevented delivery. The ZNDH also purchased 20 AVIA FL.3 basic trainers, nine Fiat G.50bis fighters and one Fiat G.50B two-seat fighter trainer. The Fiat aircraft were to provide the ZNDH's fighter pilots with some operational training on more modern aircraft.

Other batches of overhauled ex-VVKJ aircraft also arrived from the Ikarus aircraft plant in Zemun, including 11 Dornier Do 17K, three Bristol Blenheim Mk I and one Caproni Ca.310 bombers, 15 Rogožarski PVT and 11 Rogožarski R-100 attack aircraft, which had been fitted with bomb racks to carry 100-kilogram (220 lb) bombs, plus a few Breguet 19s, Potez 25s, Zmaj Fizir FNs and Zmaj Fizir FP-2s. From Prague in Czechoslovakia (under German occupation), the ZNDH received seven Avia Fokker F.7 transports, one Avia Fokker F.9 and one Avia Fokker F.18. Of these, the F.7s and F.18 were pre-war Czech airliners. As the ZNDH suffered from a total lack of transport aircraft, these were immediately pressed into service, after only minor adjustments. Some were even used to provide scheduled air-line services.

The nine Fiat G.50bis fighters took off from Turin-Fiat Aviazione on 12 June 1942, but before crossing the border they were stopped by an order from Capo di Stato Maggiore Cavallero, that was afraid the ZNDH pilots could defect with the new Fiat aircraft. The G.50 aircraft had to wait until 25 June before being delivered to the 16th Squadron at Banja Luka, but during the course of 1942, five were transferred to the 1st Squadron stationed in Zagreb in order to strengthen the defence of the NDH capital. Their deployment between the two squadrons was aimed to further familiarise the ZNDH fighter pilots with more sophisticated aircraft. Until that time, the only fighters available in numbers were the seven ancient Avia BH-33E biplanes and four Ikarus IK-2 gull wing fighters (for which there were very few spares), as well as 11 Rogožarski R-100 parasol wing fighter-trainers.

Thanks to this extended aircraft park the ZNDH could now form new units: in January the 1st Group, comprising the 1st, 2nd, 3rd and 19th Squadrons was formed at Zagreb, and then the 2nd Group with the 4th, 5th and 6th squadrons and the 3rd Group with the 7th, 8th and 9th Squadrons at Sarajevo's Rajlovac airfield, whilst the 6th Group was formed at Banja Luka's Zaluzani airfield in June 1942 to cover operations in central Croatia and western Bosnia.

These reinforcements came just in time to participate in a large German offensive against the Partisan forces in eastern Bosnia. Initially, the Regia Aeronautica also participated in this campaign, but after an incident where an Italian bomber mistakenly attacked German positions near Vlasenica, the German command assigned the ZNDH the responsibility for providing the entire aerial support mission for formations on the ground. At this time there were no significant Luftwaffe forces based in Yugoslavian territory. In support of the ground forces, the ZNDH flew 121 combat missions in January, 100 missions in February and 350 in March. Although the Axis ground forces generally succeeded in their operations in January and February, in March they were forced to release the pressure as other Partisan units attacked several solitary NDH garrisons, threatening to destroy them.

Aside from constant bombing sorties, Potez 25 and Breguet 19 aircraft were also used for daily supply missions to the besieged army garrison at Rogatica. They would land under fire at a small improvised grass landing strip, unloading ammunition and other supplies while keeping their engines running and taking off as soon as was possible. On 23 March, a ZNDH Potez 25 was shot down by the Partisans and the crew were killed. Three days later an Avia Fokker F.9 was damaged whilst dropping ammunition to Rogatica but managed to return to base safely. As a result of the determined re-supply effort by the ZNDH, the Rogatica garrison succeeded in holding out until relieved by German-NDH forces on 17 April.

As the weather improved towards the summer, flying activity intensified. Some 325 missions were flown during April, with a further 350 sorties during May, including direct combat support, reconnaissance and supply missions, as well as leaflet dropping. Most of the missions were performed by the 2nd and 3rd Group's squadrons based at Sarajevo, which was the strongest operational base at that time. The Zagreb air base was principally employed in attacking Partisan positions in western Slavonia and Bosnia.

The 10 new Caproni Ca.311Ms were tried out during the successive attacks on Partisan territory. They were equally divided between 3rd Squadron (Zagreb) and 7th Squadron (Rajlovac). During September and October Blenheims from 8th Squadron and the Dornier Do 17Ks from 3rd and 9th Squadrons were extensively used to attack Partisan positions in Bihać, Bugojno, Livno and Duvno and Bosnia. Owing to the availability of increased numbers of aircraft, the 6th Group was formed at Banja Luka comprising the 13th, 16th, 17th and 18th Squadrons. Not only did this medium bomber force fly reconnaissance and bombing missions against Partisan forces, but also flew deep into territory under Partisan control and attacked railway stations, road traffic, agricultural depots and food stocks. The Partisan forces were aware of the threat to their operations that the ZNDH provided and were constantly trying to improve their anti-aircraft defence, which relied mainly on machineguns.

December 1942 also saw the return of the HZL bomber squadron to Croatia from service on the Eastern Front, where they had flown more than 1,500 sorties. Upon its return the squadron was redesignated 1./(Kroat.)KG after having flown its nine Dornier Do 17Z bombers from Russia back to the NDH. The Dorniers proved a welcome addition to the strike power of the Axis forces fighting the Partisans in Yugoslavian territory right up to the end of 1944. In late 1943, a second squadron, 2./(Kroat.)KG was formed to provide operational training. It was equipped with Italian designed and built CANT Z.1007 and Fiat BR.20 medium bombers.

During the course of 1942, the ZNDH flew some 4,800 sorties, of which 30% were combat missions, with 35 aircraft being lost. Of these losses, 19 were to Partisan ground fire, 12 to accidents and four deserted. By the end of the year the ZNDH aircraft park consisted of 191 aircraft, formed into 14 squadrons.

1942 had seen the first desertions of aircraft from the ZNDH, the first on 23 May when a Breguet and a Potez had defected to the Partisan forces. The army conducted an intensive search for the aircraft and in response the Partisans produced two decoy scale-model aircraft, made of wood and canvas, which were duly destroyed by ZNDH bombers. Both "destroyed" aircraft were able to perform a number of attacks on army units (armed with hand-made pipe bombs) before either being shot down (the Breguet on 4 June) or destroyed on the ground (the Potez on 6 July). The two other defections occurred in July and October, with a Blenheim bomber in each case flying to Turkey.

==== ZNDH paratroops ====
In January 1942, the ZNDH formed a parachute unit, known as the 1st Light Infantry Parachute Company (Croatian: Prva laka padobranska satnija, 1 PLS). It had a strength of 120 men and was based in the northern town of Koprivnica, near the border with Hungary. An Avia Fokker F.7 tri-motor transport aircraft was assigned to the unit on a permanent basis, with other transports assigned as required. The paratroops were equipped with rifles, sub-machine guns, light machine guns and light mortars. After a period of training, 1 PLS made a demonstration mass tactical jump on 6 July 1943 at Borongaj airfield, Zagreb. Forty five paratroopers made a successful jump from three Avia Fokker transports.

On 6 November 1943, three brigades of the Partisans, supported by artillery and heavy machine-guns mounted an attack on the town of Koprivnica, which they took on 9 November. The paratroops of 1 PLS held out at their base for three days before withdrawing into Hungary and continuing the battle with other NDH and German defending forces until 29 November. They received direct air support from ZNDH Dornier Do 17Ks, as well as supplies from light aircraft, but were unable to prevent the loss of their base, together with 20 men, all of their parachute equipment and their transport aircraft. The ZNDH also lost a Dornier Do 17K bomber and a Bücker Bü 131 biplane shot down during this period.

The unit was re-deployed in 1944 to Borongaj airfield in Zagreb and in June 1944 grew in strength with the addition of three further companies and was re-designated as the 1st Light Infantry Parachute Battalion (Croatian: 1 Padobranska lovačka bojna, 1 PLB). They were responsible for the ground defence of this important air base and also performed ceremonial guard duties in Zagreb itself. By late January 1945 the unit was equipped with white winter jackets for camouflage and attached to the NDH Motorized Brigade, seeing its first action on this new sector, south of Zagreb. 1 PLB remained in constant action against the advancing Partisans until the last unit surrendered in Austria on 14 May 1945, one week after the official end of World War II.

=== 1943 ===
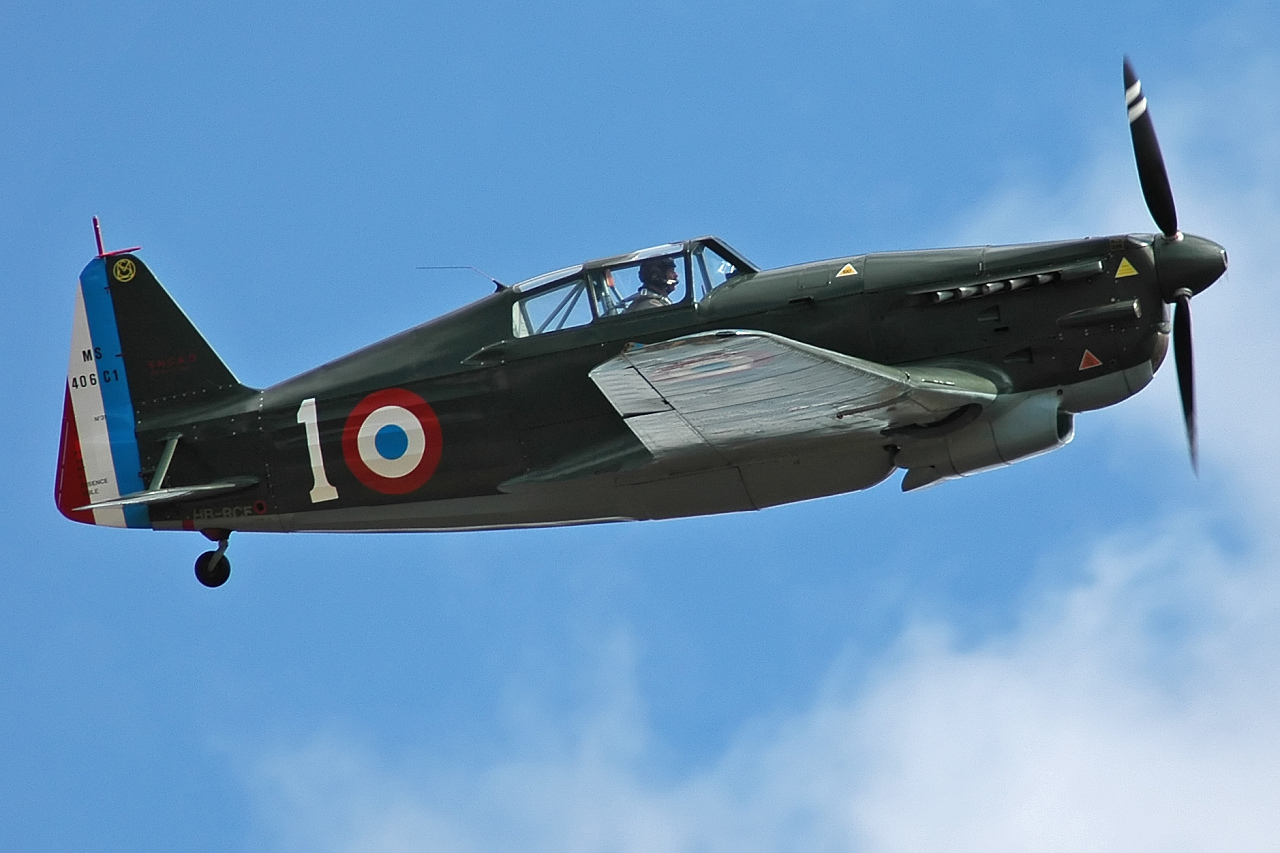
The Morane-Saulnier M.S.406 was a French designed fighter aircraft captured by Germany in 1940 and sold to the NDH in 1943.

At the beginning of 1943 the Axis forces had complete control of the airspace over Yugoslavian territory. No aerial opposition of any kind was expected and that was the primary reason that the bomber force could operate without any fighter cover, notwithstanding the fact that there was a total lack of any serious fighter force in the ZNDH's squadrons. However, the situation started to change by the beginning of 1943. The Headquarters (HQ) of the ZNDH had plans to re-arm at least one Group with more modern aircraft of German or Italian origin. The Italians refused to supply the requested Macchi C.200 and Macchi C.202 fighters, as the Regia Aeronautica needed every aircraft to fill its own squadrons in the beginning of 1943.

This was because the situation began to change in favour of the Allies. They had landed in North Africa while the Soviets were undertaking their great winter offensive, endangering, and eventually defeating, the German 6th Army around Stalingrad.

The Partisan movement in Yugoslavia, aside from some smaller territories, established a large liberated territory extending west of the rivers Neretva and Bosna, in the direction of the cities of Zagreb and Rijeka. The Partisan force had grown stronger – it had more than 60,000 armed fighters in this so-called "Tito's State" who were both well trained and supported by artillery. On 20 January 1943, the German HQ in Yugoslavia launched an offensive codenamed Operation Weiss, intending to regain the lost territory. The attack was supported by aircraft from the Luftwaffe, Regia Aeronautica and the ZNDH. Aircraft from the 2nd and 3rd Groups from Sarajevo and the 6th Group from Banja Luka were involved in bombing raids as well as leaflet dropping missions.

The Banja Luka air base was reinforced by a newly formed 5th Group after the end of Operation Weiss. The ZNDH now consisted of three air bases with six Groups and 14 squadrons. During 1943 new aircraft continued to arrive, with 30 overhauled Dornier Do 17E bombers delivered from Germany and divided between the 3rd Squadron (Zagreb), and the 13th and 15th Squadrons (Banja Luka). From Italy came 34 long promised ex-VVKJ Bücker Bü 131 Jungmans and 25 Saiman 200 light biplane trainers and liaison aircraft, which were dispatched to all three air bases. They were also used to deliver mail and fresh meat to isolated/surrounded towns and garrisons.

Although the ZNDH had a brief role in the subsequent anti-Partisan offensive, Operation Schwarz in mid-1943, its main involvement was on the front in the central NDH. As always, the Partisan resistance displayed frustrating survivability and effectiveness and new events started to influence the fighting in Yugoslavia. The Partisan forces were well aware of the constant threat of air attack posed by the ZNDH's medium bomber force and on 10 August 1943 undertook a devastating night attack by a brigade on Sarajevo's Rajlovac airfield. The three and a half hour assault on the airfield left 10 ZNDH bombers, plus another five Luftwaffe bombers and transports, destroyed, with another 17 aircraft damaged. Although some aircrews returned fire from the machine-gun turrets of their aircraft, Partisan losses were less than 20. Afterwards ZNDH Command complained that the German ordered dispersal of aircraft around the airfield's perimeter, in case of air attack, made the aircraft especially vulnerable to just this type of ground attack.

By mid-1943, following the capture of southern Italy, Allied aircraft started to appear over the Balkans. NDH military command was aware of this danger and was trying to persuade the Germans to provide at least two squadrons of Messerschmitt Bf 109 fighters to the ZNDH. However, instead of Bf 109s, the only reinforcement fighters that came from Germany were the first of a batch of 36 overhauled captured French Morane-Saulnier M.S.406 fighters in October, plus another dozen which arrived in December. The Germans also supplied 25 Beneš-Mráz Beta-Minor sporting two seater monoplanes, which were dispatched between the squadrons for liaison duty, as the lack of radio communications equipment at squadron level was still evident.

Mid-September 1943 saw the dismissal of Kren from command of the ZNDH. He was replaced by Lieutenant Colonel Adalbert Rogulja, who initiated a major reorganisation.

Following the capitulation of Italy in September 1943, around 60 Regia Aeronautica aircraft were found at Mostar and Zadar airfields and 33 machines were incorporated into the ZNDH. This number included further Fiat G.50 fighters, as well as six Fiat CR.42 biplane fighters. Some CANT Z.1007 and Fiat BR.20 bombers were also added into the ZNDH. The Luftwaffe subsequently also supplied the HZL fighter squadron with about 20-25 Fiat G.50s captured by German troops on Regia Aeronautica airfields in the Balkans.

The capitulation of Italy also brought with it the real threat of an invasion by the Allies of the Dalmatian coast. As a result, on 9 September, orders were received by 1./(Kroat.)KG to execute two coastal reconnaissance sorties over the central and south Adriatic each morning and afternoon. On 10 October one of its Dornier Do 17Zs was intercepted by eight Spitfire Mk.VIII fighters of No. 92 Squadron RAF near the coast of Italy. All of the fighters made firing passes on the Dornier, which was shot down, the crew bailing out. One Spitfire was hit by return fire and crashed into the sea, killing its pilot. After this, reconnaissance sorties were confined to the vicinity of the Dalmatian coast.

Attacks on Partisan forces continued, and on 3 October seven Dornier Do 17Zs caught 2. bataljon of Brigada Braća Radić (2nd battalion of the Radić Brothers Brigade) on the move at Šemovec, on the Varaždin-Ludbreg road. In over one hour's concentrated aerial bombardment, the battalion sustained some 60 casualties, including 42 dead.

Although the ZNDH was now able to mount a credible threat against the insurgents, by then a new menace was arriving from the other side of the Adriatic. On 30 June 1943, the first Allied reconnaissance flights were reported, followed by the first USAAF bombers, when 61 B-24 Liberators of IX Bomber Command overflew the NDH on a deep penetration raid on the Austrian city of Wiener Neustadt on 13 August. The ZNDH's 3rd Flak Group, defending Brod na Savi (Slavonski Brod), managed to shoot down a single bomber en route to its target. The best aircraft that the ZNDH could put up to defend its homeland at the end of 1943 were 20 Morane-Saulnier M.S.406s, 10 Fiat G.50s, six Fiat CR.42s, five Avia BH-33s and two Ikarus IK-2 fighters – aircraft that had been obsolete in 1940.

By the end of 1943 the ZNDH was 9,775 strong and equipped with 295 aircraft, having lost 61 shot down, destroyed on the ground, in accidents and five desertions.

=== 1944 ===
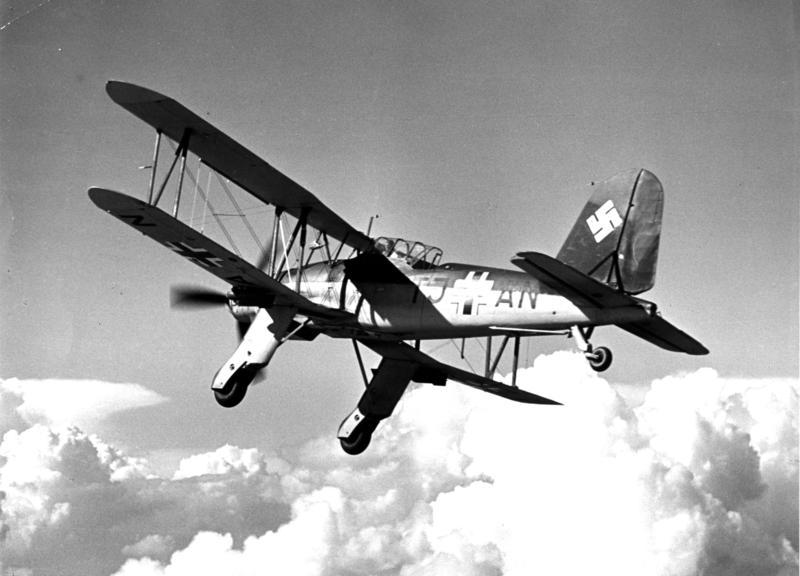
Between nine and 12 Fieseler Fi 167s were sold to the ZNDH in September 1944 and continued in service until May 1945.

The Italian designed and built Macchi C.202 fighter.

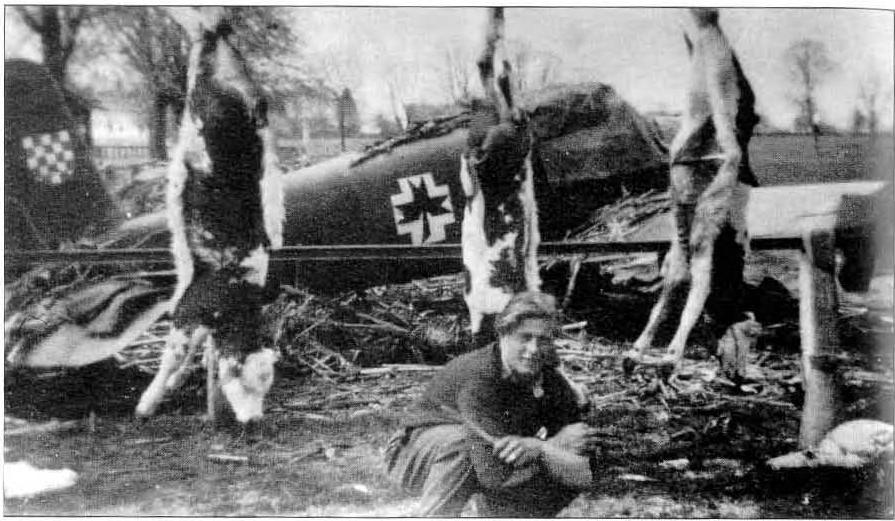
ZNDH Bücker Bü 181 Bestmann in Bosnia, late 1944, awaiting its cargo.

With the capitulation of Italy, the ZNDH lost an important source of new aircraft and the tide turned significantly when Allied air raids on targets in the Balkans became a reality. The Luftwaffe fighter squadrons stationed in Ljubljana, Zagreb, southern Austria and northern Italy fought heavy battles to stop the American USAAF heavy bomber armada. The ZNDH was also included in the defence with the newly formed 11th Fighter Group (Croatian: 11 lovačka skupina) consisting of the 21st, 22nd and 23rd Fighter Squadrons (Croatian: Lovačka jata) equipped with Morane-Saulnier M.S.406 and Fiat G.50 aircraft.

1944 also saw the return of the HZL fighter squadron to the NDH from service on the Eastern Front. It was redesignated Kroat. JGr 1 and its operational fighter squadron was redesignated 2./(Kroat.)JGr. Soon after arrival 2./(Kroat.)JGr sent its ZNDH pilots to collect 12 brand new Macchi C.202 fighters direct from the plant near Milan in Italy. The Italian designed and built Macchi C.202 fighter was the first up-to-date fighter available to the ZNDH. These aircraft retained their Luftwaffe markings whilst in service with the unit. A second training/operational conversion squadron was also formed, designated 3./(Kroat.)JGr and equipped with Fiat G.50, Macchi C.200 and Fiat CR.42 fighters. After a period of operational conversion, the squadron commenced operations against the frequent incursions over the NDH by USAAF and RAF aircraft. During a period of intensive activity over the summer of 1944, the squadron claimed some 20 Allied aircraft shot down, while at the same time receiving six further Macchi C.202s, as well as four brand new Macchi C.205s.

The ZNDH's long obsolete Morane-Saulnier M.S.406 and Fiat G.50 fighter aircraft also attempted to intercept the USAAF bomber formations, often stressing their old engines beyond the limit. They were no match for the escorting Mustang and Thunderbolt USAAF fighters and suffered heavy losses, both in the air and on the ground.

By the end of 1944 the HZL squadron had handed in its remaining worn-out Macchis for brand new German Messerschmitt Bf 109G & K fighters. A total of 21 Bf 109s had been delivered to the ZNDH by year's end.

Allied aircraft specifically started targeting ZNDH and Luftwaffe bases and aircraft for the first time as a result of the Seventh anti-Partisan Offensive, including Operation Rösselsprung in late May 1944. Until then Axis aircraft could fly inland almost at will as long as they remained at low altitude. Partisan units on the ground frequently complained about enemy aircraft attacking them while hundreds of Allied aircraft flew above at higher altitude. This changed during Rösselsprung as Allied fighter-bombers went low en-masse for the first time, establishing full aerial superiority. Consequently, both the ZNDH and Luftwaffe were forced to limit their operations in clear weather to early morning and late afternoon hours.

In June, the ZNDH finally received from Germany the long-promised airdrop containers for aerial resupply of ammunition and other equipment, constantly in need by besieged and encircled garrisons all over the NDH. They were immediately put to good use and eased the work of the already overstretched ZNDH. The Dornier Do 17s of the ZNDH proved to be especially well suited for such tasks. June also saw Kren returned to his previous position as head of the ZNDH.

Toward the end of June, the ZNDH received the first of 22 Bücker Bü 181 Bestmann aircraft. The 19th and 20th Transport Squadrons received five each, with the remainder issued to the 1st Pilot School. Besides liaison duties, they were used to transport fresh meat from Bosnia to Zagreb, where there was a food shortage.

Fifteen Ju 87D dive bombers and a few Ju 87R-2 extended range dive bombers are known to have been supplied to the HZL, and six of these were flown operationally against Soviet troops in the late summer of 1944.

In the second half of 1944, the situation on all fronts rapidly worsened for the Axis forces. Soviet, Bulgarian and Partisan armies had liberated the whole eastern part of Yugoslavia and Partisan forces in Bosnia pressed their attacks on even larger Axis garrisons. In a surprise attack on 20 September, they captured the city of Banja Luka and the ZNDH's airbase at Zaluzani airfield, including 11 unserviceable aircraft. In the total confusion during the attack on the airfield, a number of ZNDH crews managed to take off and escape at the last moment, some even starting their take off runs when barely clear of open hangar doors, using suppressing fire provided by their machine-gun turrets, whilst others took off under heavy Partisan fire. The city and airbase were re-taken several days later in a heavy counter-attack by NDH and German troops.

The Germans also continued to supply second-line aircraft to the ZNDH, including between nine and 12 exotic Fieseler Fi 167 biplane torpedo bombers. These had been originally designed and intended for use aboard the German aircraft carrier Graf Zeppelin, which was never completed. After that they were sold to the NDH, where their short-field and load-carrying abilities made them ideal not only for attack missions, but also for transporting ammunition and other supplies to besieged army garrisons. Many of these missions were flown between their arrival in September 1944 and the end of the War (under the right conditions, the aircraft could descend almost vertically). During one such mission, near Sisak on 10 October 1944, an Fi 167 of the ZNDH was attacked by five P-51 Mustang Mk IIIs of 213 Squadron RAF. The crew of the Fieseler (piloted by an ex-HZL eight-kill Flying ace), exploiting the aircraft's extreme maneuverability to the fullest, had the distinction of shooting down one of the Mustangs before itself being shot down; possibly one of the last biplane "kills" of the war.

=== 1945 ===
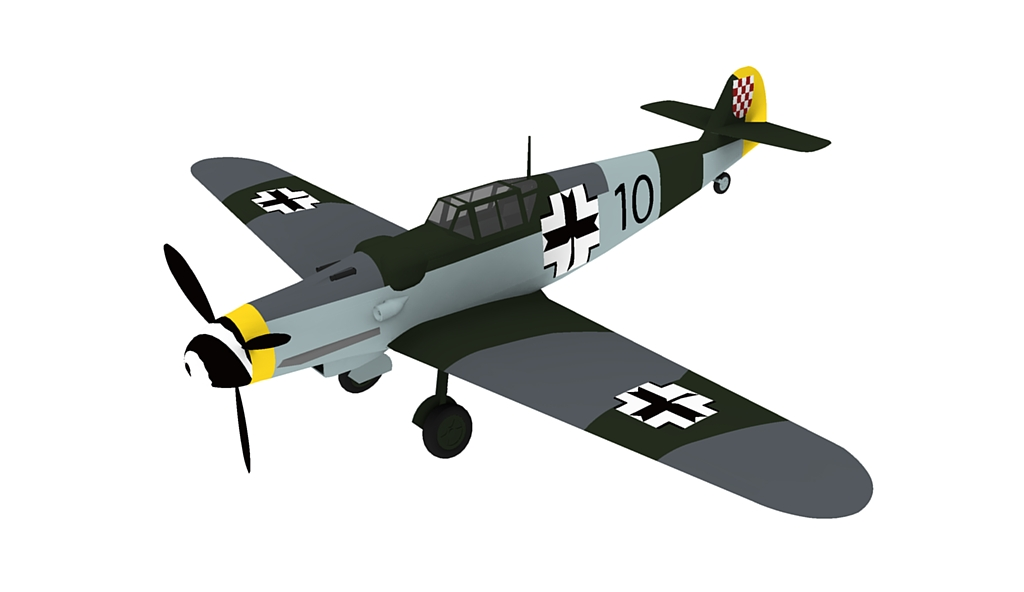
Digital rendering of a ZNDH Messerschmitt Bf 109G, with 1945 camouflage colours and insignia.

The year preceding 1945 had been catastrophic for the ZNDH. Aircraft losses amounted to 234, primarily on the ground, and it began 1945 with 196 machines, including 17 Messerschmitt Bf 109Gs, 12 Morane-Saulnier M.S.406s, seven Fiat G.50s and two Fiat CR.42 fighters and some 30 multi-engined bombers, although shortages of fuel had begun to hamper operations.

Further deliveries of new aircraft from Germany continued in the early months of 1945 to replace losses, with 39 arriving by the end of March. These included, in addition to regular Messerschmitt Bf 109G deliveries, the final dozen Dornier Do 17 medium bombers, which arrived in January. In March, despite the loss of 15 Bf 109G&Ks, ten Morane-Saulnier M.S.406, three Fiat CR.42 and two Fiat G.50, the ZNDH's fighter force included 23 Messerschmitt Bf 109G&Ks, three Morane-Saulnier M.S.406, six Fiat G.50 and two Messerschmitt Bf 110G fighters. With the Bf 109G the ZNDH were finally able to face the USAAF and RAF on equal terms, with two squadrons equipped with the type from late 1944. In April, the ZNDH still possessed 176 aircraft.

The ZNDH's modest transport force was also utilised in assisting with the evacuation of Sarajevo between 1 and 5 April, with Dornier Do 17, Savoia Marchetti SM 79 and SM 82, Caproni CA 311 and 313, as well as Junkers W34 aircraft taking part.

The ZNDH's Dornier Do 17 medium bombers were still hitting back when and where they could. On 31 December 1944, a Dornier Do 17E destroyed an RAF 148 Squadron Handley Page Halifax bomber on the ground at the Partisan airfield in Grabovnica, near Čazma. On 10 February 1945, after a bridge-busting sortie on the Drava, a single ZNDH Dornier Do 17Z bombed the Partisans' 1. Zagorska Brigada (1st Zagorje Brigade) near Daruvar, inflicting two dozen casualties. Late in the afternoon of 30 March, four Dornier Do 17Z bombers, escorted by four Bf 109G fighters attacked the Partisans near Gospić. On 15 April 1945, a force made up of a Dornier Do 17Z, escorted by two Bf 109Gs destroyed two Partisan aircraft at their airfield in Sanski Most.

Despite these raids, the war's outcome had become apparent. Defections of ZNDH personnel and aircraft to the Allies and Partisans intensified, including two Bf 109s to Italy on 16 April and a further two Messerschmitts to the Partisans in Mostar on 20 April. The last fighter delivery took place on 23 April 1945. It was also on this day that the final Croatian kills were scored when an ex-HZL 16-kill ace and his wingman claimed two RAF P-51 Mustangs shot down in their Bf 109Gs, one of which was confirmed. The last attack mission was flown on 6 May, when two antiquated Rogožarski R-100 fighter trainers bombed the railway bridge over the Kupa in an effort to stop the Partisan advance on Karlovac, south of Zagreb. One of the Yugoslav-built parasol wing aircraft was hit by ground fire and the pilot crash-landed near his target. He was captured and shot on the spot.

That evening, with the Partisans advancing upon Zagreb, the commanding officer of the ZNDH fighter group gathered his men at Zagreb's Lucko airfield and released them from their oath of loyalty and announced that each was free to go. Some flew their aircraft and crews, including several Dornier Do 17s and a CANT Z.1007 to Italy and surrendered to the Allied forces there. Some flew their aircraft over to the Partisans, including several light aircraft and some Bf 109s, whilst others, also including Bf 109s, as well as at least one Dornier Do 17Z, a Messerschmitt Bf 110G-2, a Bristol Blenheim I and a Yugoslav-designed and built Zmaj Fizir FP-2, sought sanctuary in Klagenfurt, Austria.

The ZNDH's four-year campaign, during which it had on its charge at one time or another some 650 aircraft, thus ended with the capture of the airbases around Zagreb on 8 May 1945. Its colourful collection of often vintage aircraft, scattered on deserted airfields, received new markings, a red star, and formed the basis of the new Yugoslav Air Force.

== Ranks ==
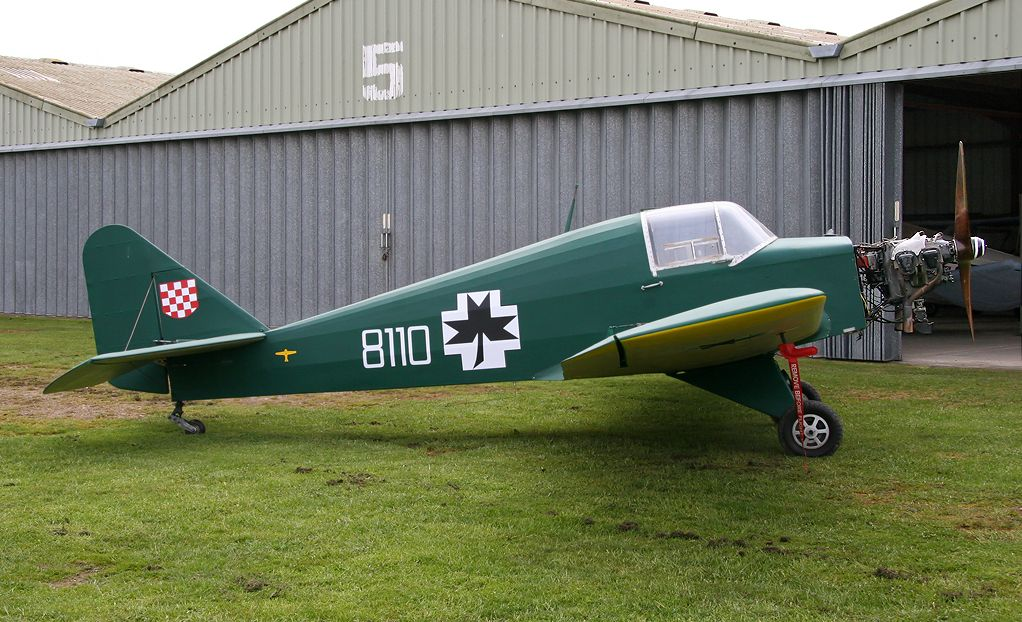
Restored AVIA FL.3 with NDH markings. The ZNDH operated 20 of these Italian training aircraft from 1942, 10 with an open cockpit and 10 examples of the enclosed cockpit version (shown above).

Collar Insignia	Shoulder Insignia	Rank	Translation
		Vojskovođa	Field Marshal
		General	General
		Podmaršal	Lieutenant General
		General bojnik	Major General
		Pukovnik	Colonel
		Podpukovnik	Lieutenant Colonel
		Bojnik	Major
		Nadsatnik	Senior Captain
		Satnik	Captain
		Natporučnik	First Lieutenant
		Poručnik	Second Lieutenant
		Zastavnik	Warrant Officer
		Časnički namjesnik	Sergeant Major
		Stožerni narednik	Staff Sergeant, Flight Sergeant
		Narednik	Sergeant
		Vodnik	Lance Sergeant
		Razvodnik	Corporal
		Desetnik	Lance Corporal
		Domobran	Home Guardsman (Private, Aircraftman)

== Commanders ==
- Vladimir Kren (April 1941–13 September 1943)
- Adalbert Rogulja (23 September 1943 – 1 June 1944)
- Vladimir Kren (June 1944–May 1945)

== Service types ==
Fighter aircraft	Number	Class	Origin
Messerschmitt Bf 109	50+	Fighter	Germany
Morane-Saulnier M.S.406	48	Fighter	France
Fiat G.50	30+	Fighter	Italy
Macchi C.202	18	Fighter	Italy
Macchi C.205	4	Fighter	Italy
Fiat CR.42	10+	Fighter	Italy
Messerschmitt Bf 110G-2	2	Fighter	Germany
Avia BH-33	7	Fighter-trainer	Czechoslovakia
Ikarus IK-2	4	Fighter	Yugoslavia
Hawker Fury II	1	Fighter	United Kingdom

Bomber aircraft	Number	Class	Origin
Rogožarski R-313	1	Bomber	Yugoslavia
Amiot 143	1	Bomber	France
Dornier Do 17K	11	Bomber	Yugoslavia
Dornier Do 17E	30	Bomber	Germany
Dornier Do 17Z	21	Bomber	Germany
Bristol Blenheim Mk.I	8	Bomber	United Kingdom
Savoia-Marchetti SM.79	5	Bomber	Italy
CANT Z.1007	10	Bomber	Italy
Fiat BR.20	6	Bomber	Italy
Avia Fokker F.39	1	Bomber	Czechoslovakia
Caproni Ca.310	7	Bomber/Utility	Italy
Caproni Ca.311/313/314	16	Bomber/Utility	Italy
Junkers Ju 87	15	Dive bomber	Germany

Transport aircraft	Number	Class	Origin
Avia Fokker F.VII	7	Transport	Czechoslovakia
Avia Fokker F.IX	2	Transport	Czechoslovakia
Junkers Ju 52	1	Transport	Germany
Junkers W 34	4	Transport	Germany
Savoia-Marchetti SM.82	2	Transport	Italy
Airspeed Envoy	2	Transport	United Kingdom

Trainer-Utility aircraft	Number	Class	Origin
Breguet 19	50	Reconnaissance/Utility	France
Potez 25	42	Reconnaissance/Utility	France
Fieseler Fi 156	11	Utility	Germany
Fieseler Fi 167	8-12	Utility	Germany
de Havilland Puss Moth D.H.80	2	Utility	United Kingdom
RWD-13	1	Utility	Poland
Beneš-Mráz Beta-Minor	25	Trainer/Utility	Czechoslovakia
Bücker Bü 181 Bestmann	22	Trainer/Utility	Germany
Saiman 200	25	Trainer	Italy
Saiman 202	2	Trainer/Utility	Italy
AVIA FL.3	20	Trainer/Utility	Italy
Rogožarski SIM-XI	1	Trainer	Yugoslavia
Rogožarski SIM-X	1	Trainer	Yugoslavia
Rogožarski PVT	15	Trainer/attack	Yugoslavia
Ikarus MM-2	1	Fighter-trainer	Yugoslavia
Rogožarski R-100	11	Fighter-trainer/attack	Yugoslavia
Bücker Bü 131	46	Trainer/Utility	Germany
Bücker Bü 133	10	Trainer/Utility	Germany
Zmaj Fizir FN	20	Trainer	Yugoslavia
Zmaj Fizir FP-2	23	Trainer/Utility	Yugoslavia

== Journal ==
The ZNDH published a weekly journal called Hrvatska Krila (Croatian Wings).

== Sources ==
- Arena, N. (1996). I caccia a motore radiale Fiat G.50 (in Italian). Modena: Mucchi editore.
- Ciglić, B.; Savić, D. (2007). Dornier Do 17: The Yugoslav Story, Operational Record 1937–1947. Belgrade: Jeroplan. ISBN 978-86-909727-0-8.
- Ciglić, B. (2020). Savoia Marchetti SM.79 The Yugoslav Story, Operational Record 1939–1947. Beograd: Jeroplan. ISBN 978-86-909727-5-3.
- Frka, D. (May 1993a). "Croatian Air Force in World War II". Scale Models International. 24 (283). ISSN 0269-834X.
- Frka, D. (June 1993b). "Croatian Air Force in World War II". Scale Models International. 24 (284). ISSN 0269-834X.
- Frka, D.; Novak, J.; Pogacic, S. (2001). Zrakoplovstvo Nezavisne Države Hrvatske 1941–45 [Airforce of the Independent State of Croatia 1941–45] (in Croatian). Zagreb: Krila. ISBN 978-2-914017-03-9.
- Holmes, T. (2004). Aircraft of the Aces – Legends of the Skies. London: Osprey. ISBN 978-1-84176-825-0.
- Hooton, E. R. (1997). Eagle in Flames: The Fall of the Luftwaffe. London: Brockhampton Press. ISBN 978-1-86019-995-0.
- Likso, T.; Canak, D. (1998). Hrvatsko Ratno Zrakoplovstvo u Drugome Svjetskom Ratu [The Croatian War Airforce in the Second World War] (in Croatian). Zagreb. ISBN 953-97698-0-9.
- Mikić, Vojislav V. (2000). Зракопловство Независне Државе Хрватске 1941-1945. године [Airforce of the Independent State of Croatia 1941–1945] (in Serbian). Belgrade: Војноисторијски институт Војске Југославије. 72669708.
- Mikulan, Krunoslav; Pogacic, Sinisa (2008). Croatian Uniforms And Insignia 1941-1945: Volume 1 – Army, Air Force, Navy. ISBN 978-9539756435.
- Mollo, A. (1982). The Armed Forces of World War II. London: Orbis. ISBN 978-0-85613-296-4.
- Neulen, H.W. (2000). In the Skies of Europe – Air Forces allied to the Luftwaffe 1939–1945. Wiltshire, UK: Crowood Press. ISBN 978-1-86126-326-1.
- Novak, J.; Spencer, D. (1998). Hrvatski Orlovi: Paratroopers of the Independent State of Croatia 1942–1945. Bayside NY: Axis Europa Books. ISBN 978-1-891227-13-4.
- Price, A. (1993). The Last Year of the Luftwaffe – May 1944 to May 1945. London: Arms and Armour. ISBN 978-1-85409-189-5.
- Savic, D.; Ciglic, B. (2002). Croatian Aces of World War II. Osprey Aircraft of the Aces – 49. Oxford: Osprey. ISBN 978-1-84176-435-1.
- Shores, C.; Cull, B.; Malizia, N. (1987). Air War for Yugoslavia, Greece & Crete – 1940–41. London: Grub Street. ISBN 978-0-948817-07-6.
- Tomasevich, J. (2001). War and Revolution in Yugoslavia 1941–1945: Occupation and Collaboration. Stanford: Stanford University Press. ISBN 978-0-8047-3615-2.
- Thomas, N.; Mikulan, K.; Pavelic, C. (1995). Axis Forces in Yugoslavia 1941–45. London: Osprey. ISBN 978-1-85532-473-2.
- Vanags-Baginskis, A. (1982). Stuka. London: Jane's Information Group. ISBN 978-0-7106-0191-9.
- Weal, E.C.; Weal, J.A.; Barker, R.F. (1977). Combat Aircraft of World War Two. Melbourne: Lothian. ISBN 978-0-85091-051-3.
