= Ikarbus =

Bus manufacturer and former aircraft manufacturer

- Official logo
- Native name: Икарбус
- Formerly: Ikarus
- Company type: Joint-stock company
- Industry: Manufacturing
- Founded: 28 June 1991; 34 years ago (current form); 1923; 103 years ago (originally founded)
- Founder: Dimitrije Konjović; Josip Mikl
- Defunct: 2022
- Headquarters: Autoput 24, Zemun, Belgrade, Serbia
- Area served: Serbia
- Key people: Aleksandar Vićentić (General director)
- Revenue: ▼€0.19 million (2022)
- Net income: ▲ (€209.59 million) (2022)
- Total assets: ▼€12.15 million (2022)
- Total equity: ▲€9.83 million (2022)
- Owners: Green Stone Investment Co. (59.08%); Univerzal banka (15.41%); Project Questra (7.06%); Government of Serbia (5.12%); Others
- Number of employees: 20 (2022)
- Website: www.ikarbus.rs
- Footnotes / references Business ID: 07739494; Tax ID: 100001628

Ikarbus a.d. (full legal name: Ikarbus – Fabrika autobusa i specijalnih vozila a.d.) is a Serbian bus manufacturer based in Zemun, Belgrade.

It was originally established as an aircraft manufacturer in 1923, under the name Ikarus. In 1954, it commenced bus production and since 1960 it completely shifted towards it. In 1992, it changed its name to Ikarbus. Since 2019, it is majority owned by the Chinese "Green Stone Investment Co.".

== History ==
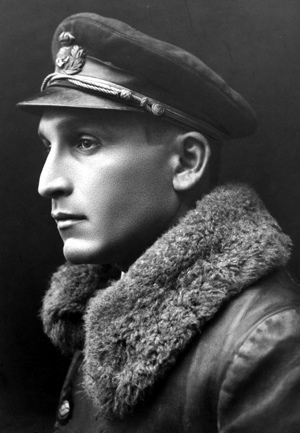
Dimitrije Konjović, pilot and co-founder of the company

On 13 October 1923, the company was established under name "Ikarus – the first Serbian airplane, car and engine industry Kovačević and Co", with headquarters in Novi Sad. The founders were Dimitrije Konjović, brothers Dušan and Milivoj Kovačević, Đoka Radulović and Josif Mikl. On 20 November 1923, "Ikarus" started business officially after the registration before the Novi Sad District Court. In the beginning, the company manufactured a number of foreign designs under licence, such as the French Potez 25, Czechoslovak Avia BH-33 and English Hawker Fury; Bristol Blenheim as well as the locally designed Ikarus ŠM, Ikarus IO, SIM-VIII, Ikarus IK-2 and Ikarus Orkan.

On 3 March 1924, the first school type airplane "Brandenburg" was manufactured. In 1927, the Yugoslavian Air Command decided that "Ikarus" should start the production of military planes; the factory for the production of military planes was built in Zemun. On 20 June 1927, "Ikarus" together with Military and Navy Ministry concluded an agreement to build a new factory of airplane engines in Rakovica. In 1928, the Sports Club "Ikarus" was established, thus "Ikarus" being the first company to build gliders in the country. By December 1932, the company relocated its headquarters from Novi Sad to Zemun. In April 1935, the first model of war airplane of domestic design was completed; a single-seat glider "IK-1", designed by engineers Ljubomir Ilić and Kosta Sivčev. In January 1936, the Yugoslav Air Command and "Ikarus" signed an agreement for the manufacturing of British "Hawker Fury" fighter plane, of all-metal construction. By the spring of 1938, the Yugoslav Air Command and the company concluded an agreement on the supply of twin-engine bombers "Blenheim", under the British license. In 1938, the Administration Building of "Ikarus" in Zemun was built.

With the start of the World War II (WWII) in Yugoslavia, the Nazi Germany occupation authorities confiscated the company on 17 April 1941. On 17 and 25 April 1944, the factory was heavily damaged in the Allied air-strikes. By early November 1944, the factory restarted operations.

On 12 August 1945, the first emergency Assembly of "Ikarus" shareholders in the socialist Yugoslavia was held in. On 27 March 1946, "Ikarus" was nationalized by the decision of the District Court of Zemun. Until the end of 1946, the subsequent decisions in form of property nationalization were made. On 22 October 1946, the first plane "Aero-2B" flew for the first time, the first prototype made by the air industry in socialist Yugoslavia. On 23 January 1948, the Government of Yugoslavia made a decision to establish the State Enterprise "Ikarus". Also, the Sports Club "Naša krila" was established.

In 1950, a single-seat fighter plane S-49 was built by engineers Ilić, Sivčev, Zrnić and Popović. In the same year, "Ikarus" manufactured the first gliders in the socialist Yugoslavia; a single-seat glider "Hawk 1" was awarded the third prize at the International Championship in Sweden. By the end of October 1952, the first Yugoslav jet plane "451 M" took off. In 1954, "Kosava" twin-seat glider received the first prize at the International Championship in England.

From 1954 onward, Ikarus also commenced bus production, originally of Sauer and MAN designs under licence, but eventually the company's own designs.

In 1957, the airplane Ikarus S-451MM set the world speed record flying at 750.34 km/hour. In 1960, the Ikarus S-451M, ultra light jet plane set the world speed record, flying at 500.2 km/hour. On 14 November 1961, by the official act of the Administration for Military Industry Affairs, "Ikarus" ceased to be a military company. Most of the personal and equipment from the aircraft section of "Ikarus" had been relocated during the previous decade to a new aircraft factory SOKO, located in Mostar, SR Bosnia and Herzegovina.

=== 1992–2019 ===
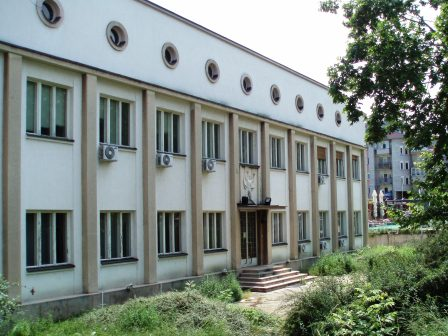
Former administrative offices, demolished in 2018

Official logo used from 1993 to 2014

In 1992, the company was privatized, and the following year changed its name to "Ikarbus", due to name usage conflicts with the Hungarian bus manufacturer with the same name.

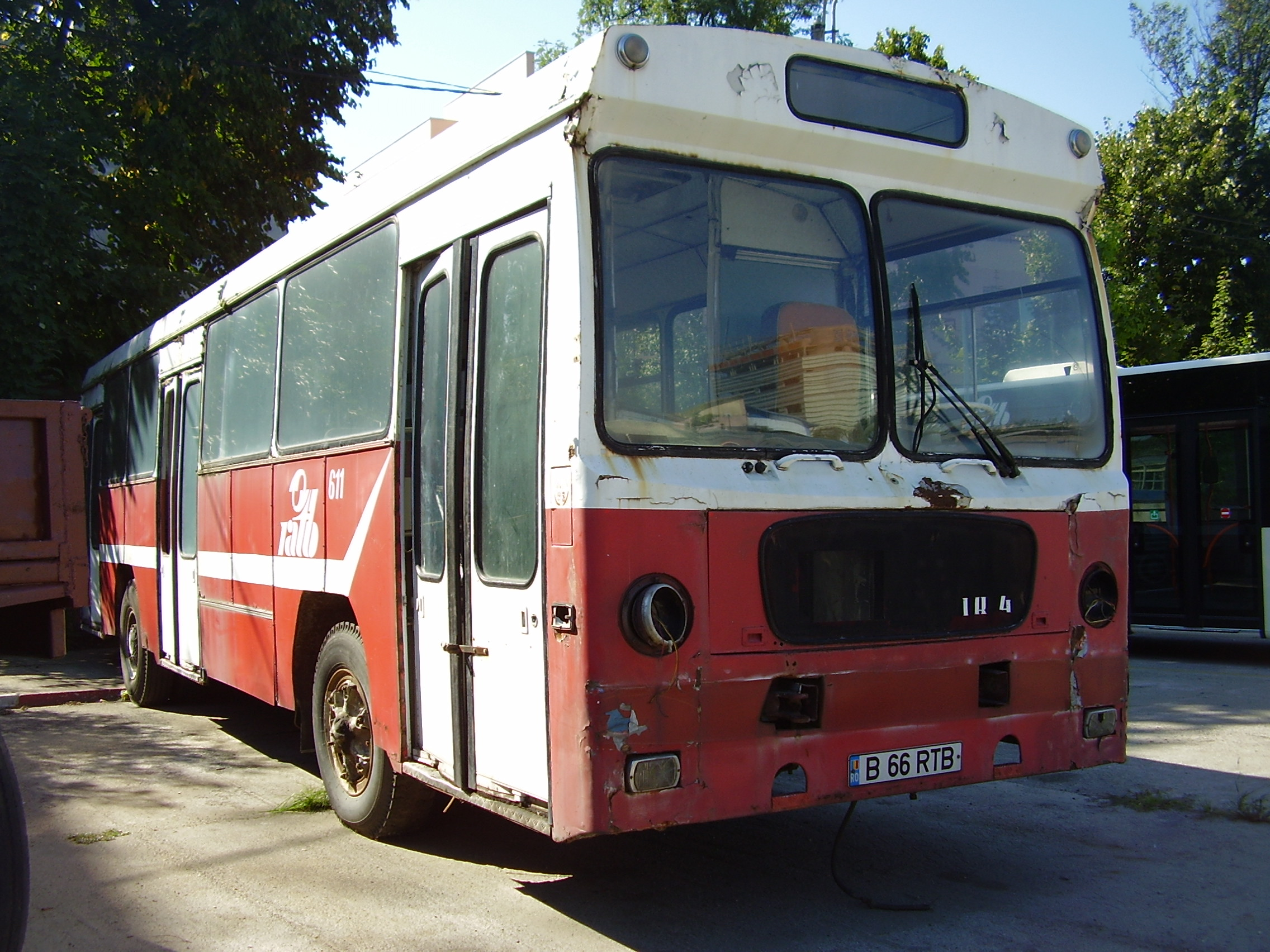
Old Ikarus IK-4 bus in Bucharest

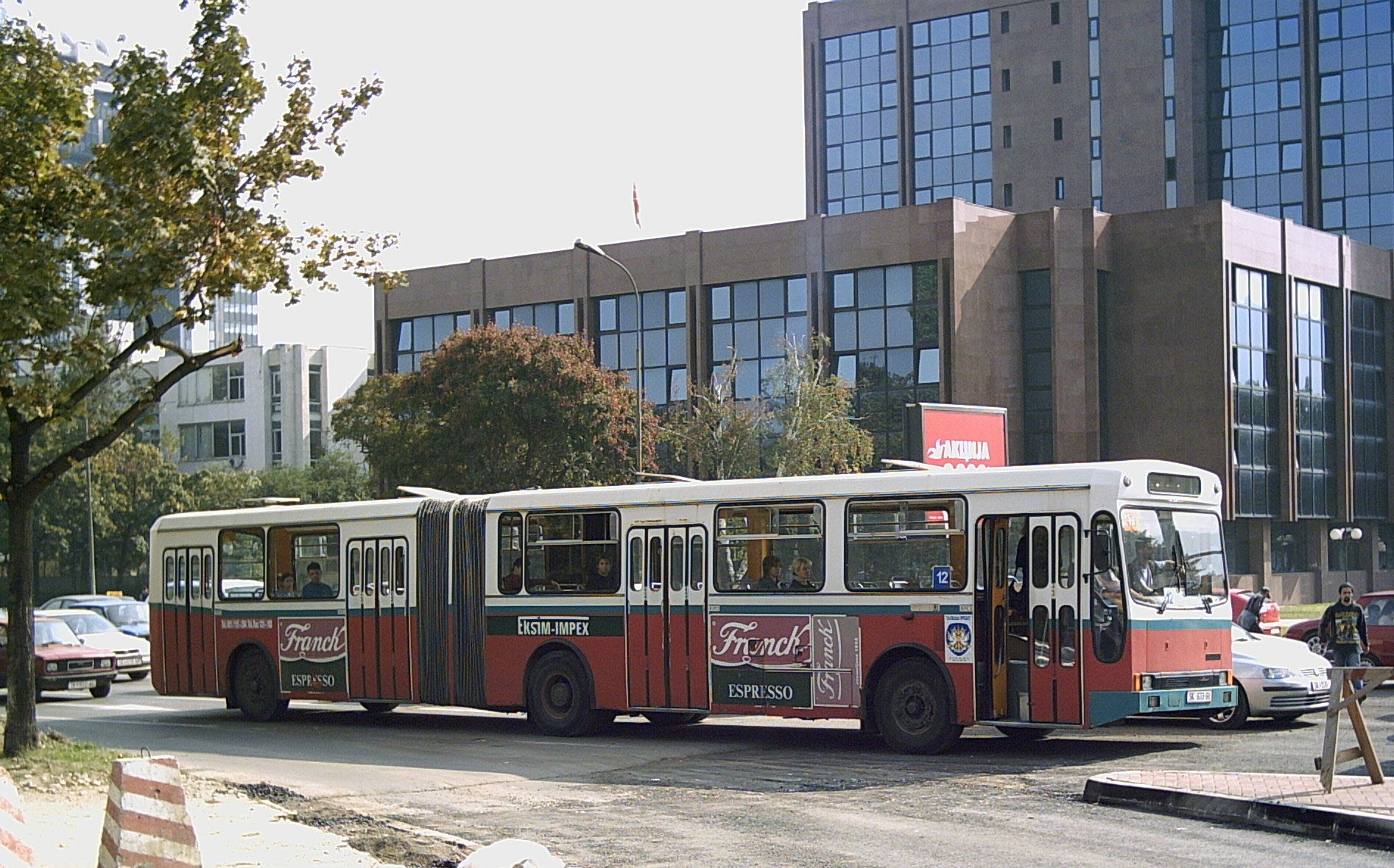
Ikarus IK-160 articulated bus in Skopje

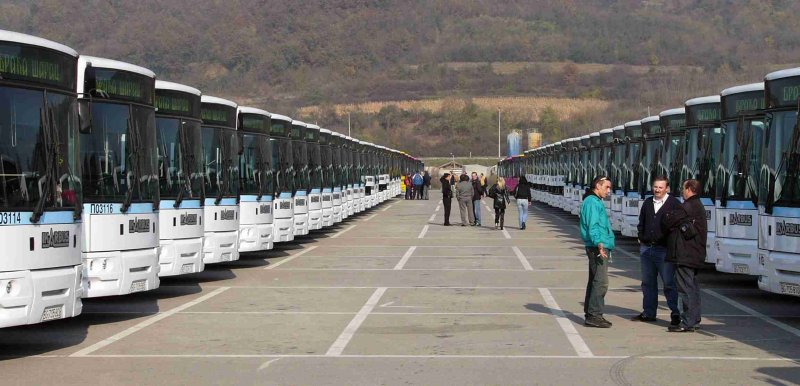
Ikarbus buses delivery in Belgrade

During the 1990s Yugoslav Wars and international sanctions imposed on FR Yugoslavia, the company's production stagnated. As there was no political will to adjust a state-owned company to a transition, that trend continued during the 2000s and 2010s, causing Ikarbus to become indebted and work in limited capacity.

=== 2019–present: Green Stone Investment Co. ownership ===
In March 2019, the Chinese "Zhuhai Yinlong New Energy" company began the process of acquiring a majority stake in company's ownership structure. Since then, the new majority owner of the company is officially the Chinese "Green Stone Investment Co.". However, there are concerns for the fate of Ikarbus, as production or reactivation of the facility in Zemun is still uncertain.

== Products ==
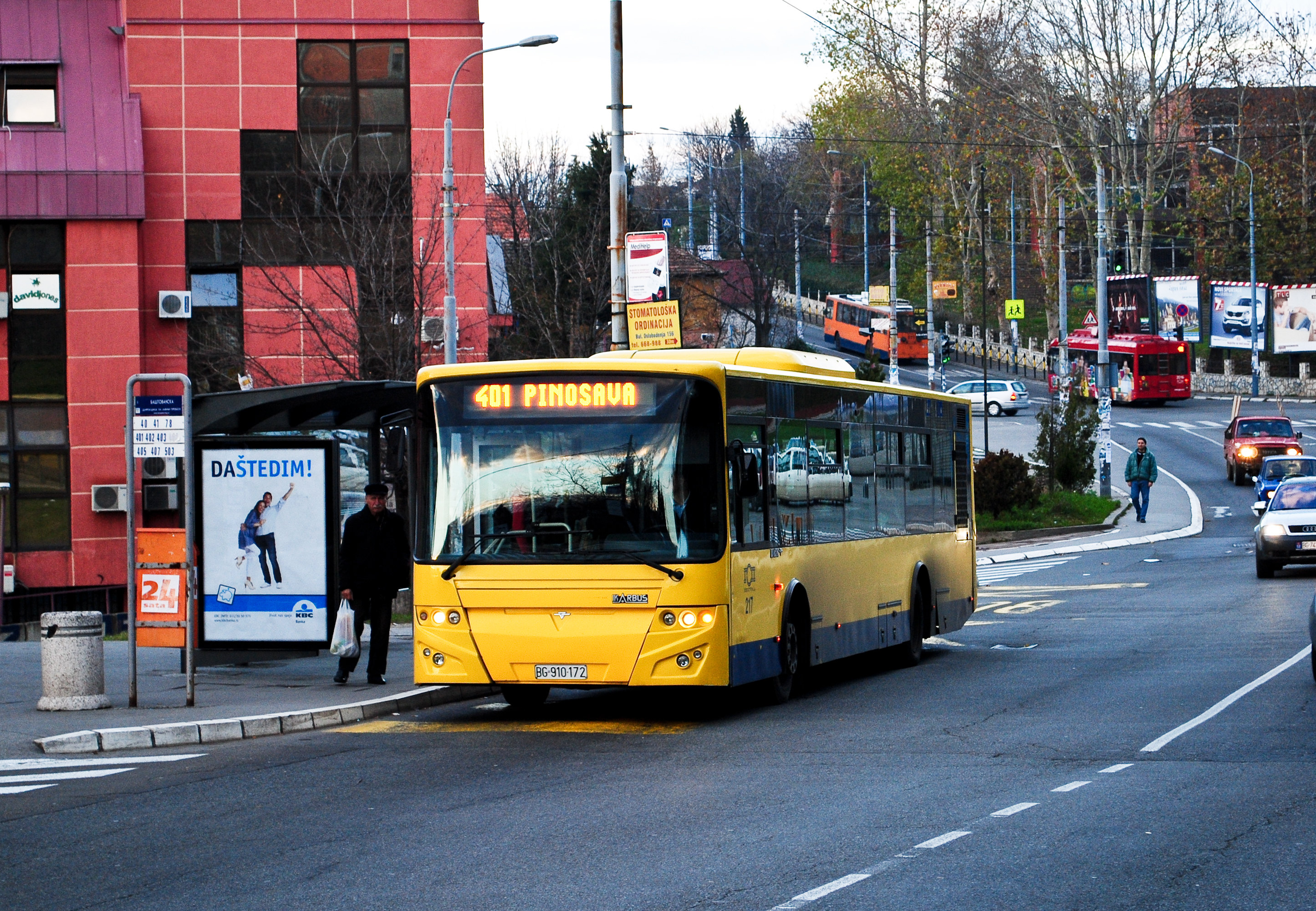
Yellow Ikarbus in Belgrade

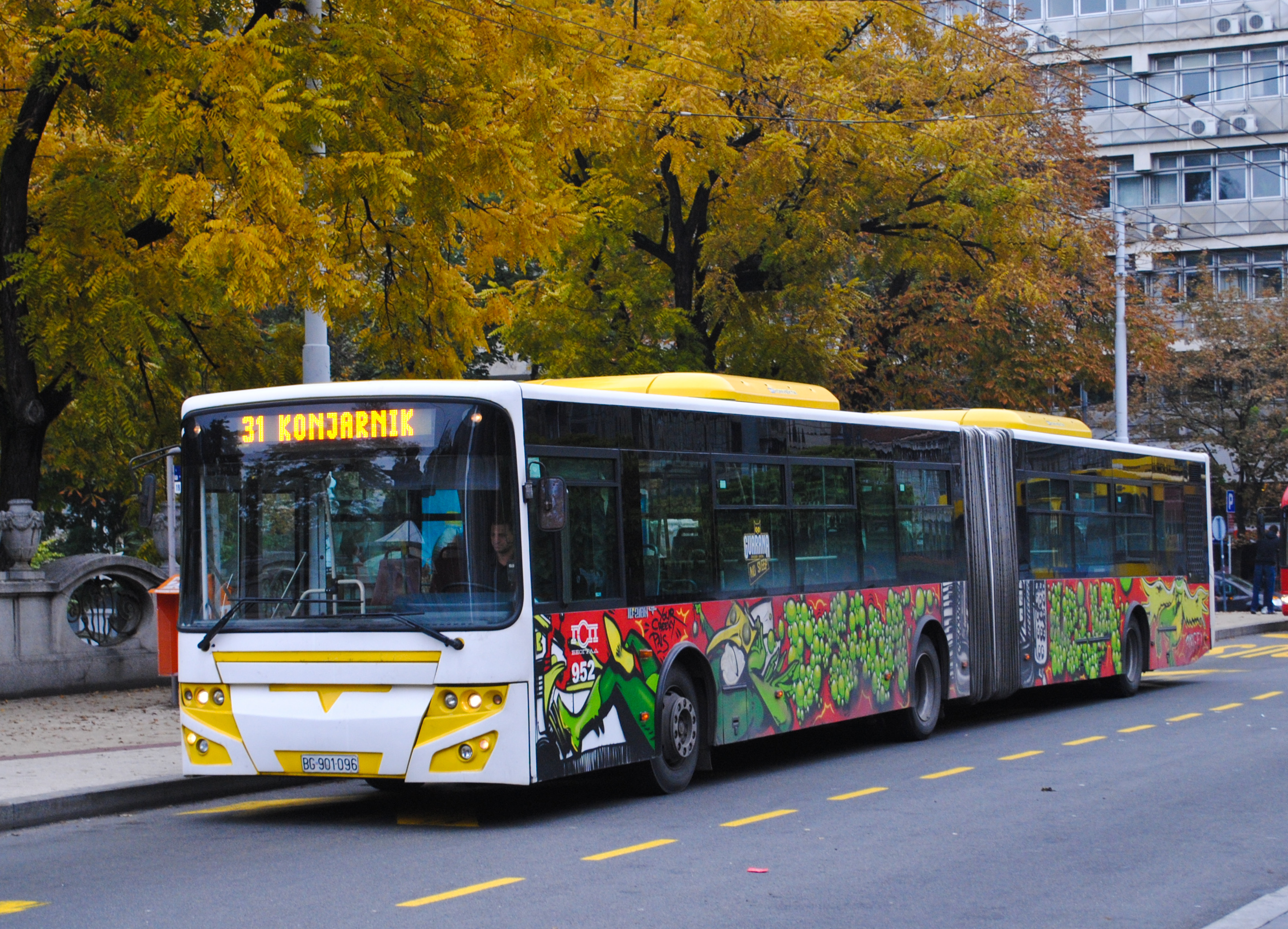
Ikarbus at Studentski Trg

Every vehicle made by Ikarbus has a name starting with 'IK', followed by a hyphen and then the vehicle's code: IK-1xxs are solo city buses, IK-2xxs are articulated city buses and IK-3xxs and IK-4xxs are coaches. Earlier IK 160(P)/161/166 models are also articulated buses. The letter N disambiguates integral models from non-integral ones.

The last produced models under Ikarbus brand were:

- IK-103 solo, MAN or Mercedes engine
- IK-103 CNG (meets EURO-5 standards)
- IK-107 minibus, Cummins engine
- IK-112M, MAN NL 323 chassis
- IK-112N solo low floor, MAN engine
- IK-112LE, Mercedes-Benz OC 500 LE chassis
- IK-206 articulated, vertical MAN engine
- IK-218N articulated low floor, MAN engine
- IK-218M articulated low floor, MAN NG 363 chassis
- IK-308, midibus coach
- IK-312, regional coach
- IK-412, long-distance coach
- IK-415, three-axle coach

=== Historical ===
==== Aircraft ====
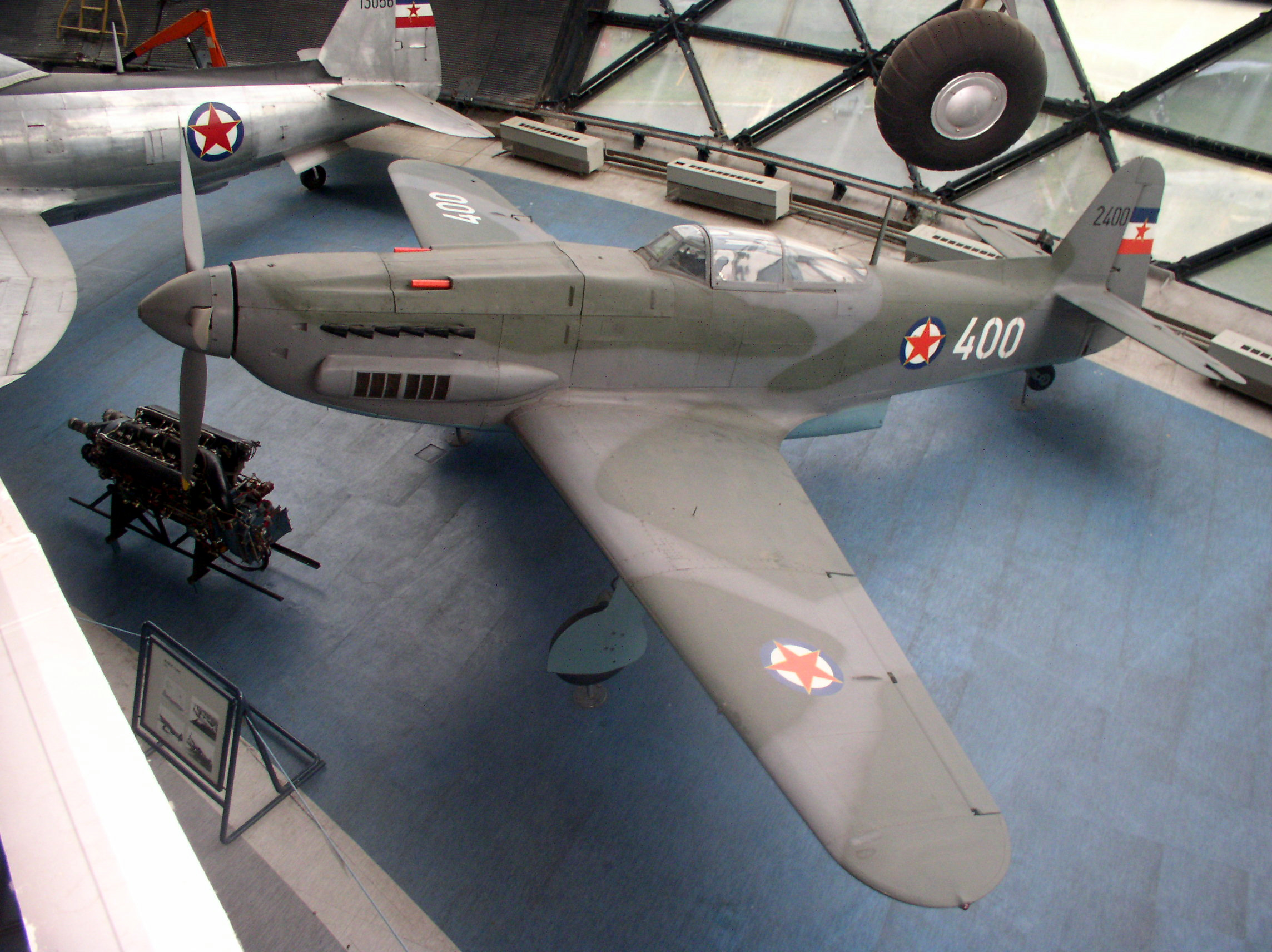
Ikarus S-49C fighter plane on display at Belgrade Aviation Museum

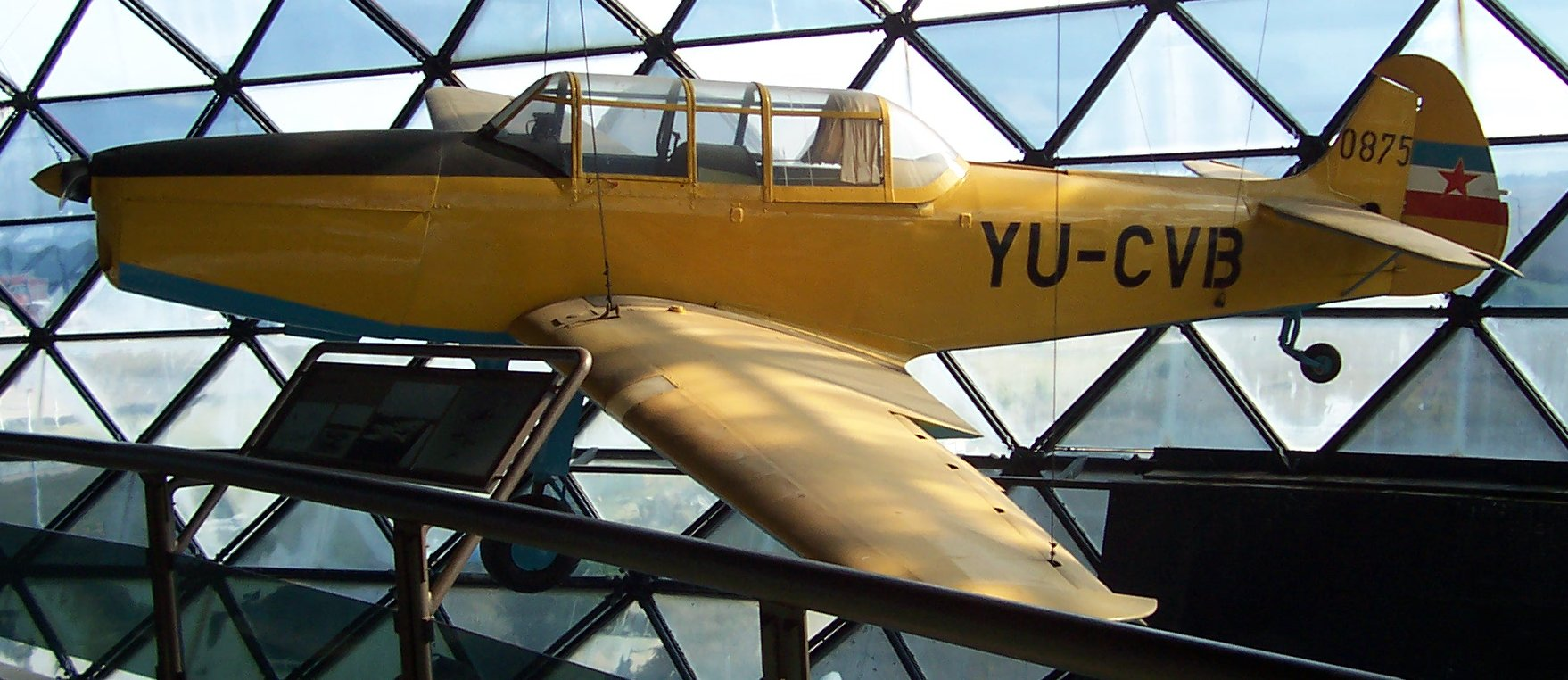
Ikarus Aero 2 primary trainer plane on display at Belgrade Aviation Museum

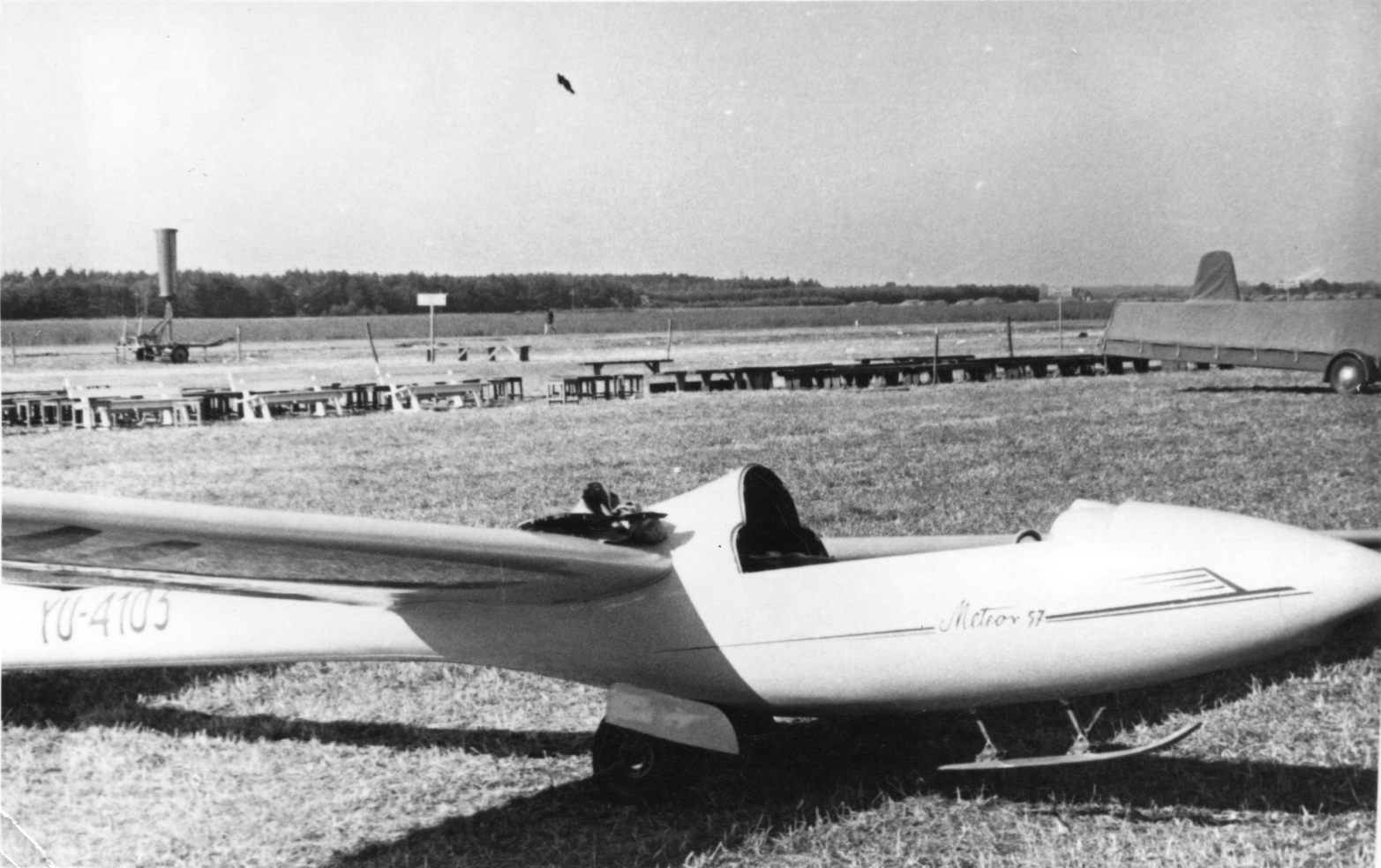
Yugoslavian glider Ikarus Meteor 57 (YU-4103), probably, at Jeżów Sudecki airstrip (Poland)

In 1927 an aeronautical section of the factory was found in Zemun where numerous planes were designed and manufactured, as well as under license. The factory included its own airfield. After the end of the World War II, in 1946, another two aeronautical companies, Zmaj and Rogožarski joined Ikarus as a wholly nationalised state aircraft industry. The Ikarus factory had manufactured in its workshops 475 aircraft up until 1962, when it stopped working for the aviation industry.

Model name	First flight	Number built	Type
Ikarus 25		220	License built single piston engine biplane reconnaissance airplane
Ikarus 211	1947	1	Single piston engine monoplane trainer
Ikarus 212	1948	(Note: Approximately 59 production aircraft were built by Utva.)	Single piston engine monoplane trainer
Ikarus 213	1948	1 (Note: Approximately 170 production aircraft were built by Utva.)	Single piston engine monoplane trainer
Ikarus 214	1949	22	Twin piston engine monoplane trainer
Ikarus 215	1949	1	Twin piston engine monoplane bomber
Ikarus 231	1948	2	Single piston engine monoplane liaison airplane
Ikarus 232 Pionir		1	Twin piston engine monoplane experimental airplane
Ikarus 251	1946	1 (Note: Approximately 79 production aircraft were built by Utva.)	Single piston engine monoplane trainer
Ikarus 252	1946	1	Single piston engine monoplane trainer
Ikarus 451	1953	2	Twin piston engine monoplane experimental airplane
Ikarus 452	1953	2	Twin jet engine monoplane experimental airplane
Ikarus 453MW	1952	1	Experimental glider
Ikarus 522	1955	2 (Note: Approximately 110 production aircraft were built by SOKO.)	Single piston engine monoplane trainer
Ikarus 920	1949	1	Transport glider
Ikarus Aero 2	1940	248	Single piston engine monoplane trainer
Ikarus BH-33E		22 (Note: An additional 20 aircraft were supplied complete from Czechoslovakia.)	License built single piston engine biplane fighter
Ikarus Blenheim		16	License built twin piston engine monoplane bomber
Ikarus Fury		24 (Note: An additional 16 aircraft were built by Zmaj.)	License built single piston engine biplane fighter
Ikarus IK-1	1935	1	Single piston engine monoplane fighter
Ikarus IK-2	1934	12	Single piston engine monoplane fighter
Ikarus IM	1926	4	Single piston engine biplane flying boat reconnaissance airplane
Ikarus IO	1926	38	Single piston engine biplane flying boat reconnaissance airplane
Ikarus J-451MM		1	Twin jet engine monoplane experimental airplane
Ikarus Kobac	1953	1	Training glider
Ikarus Košava	1953	2	Glider
Ikarus Kurir	1955	~145	Single piston engine monoplane liaison airplane
Ikarus Meteor	1955	~2	Glider
Ikarus MM-2	1940	1	Single piston engine monoplane trainer
Ikarus Orao	1949		Glider
Ikarus Orkan	1940	1	Twin piston engine monoplane light bomber
Ikarus S-49	1949	158	Single piston engine monoplane fighter
Ikarus S-451		1	Twin piston engine monoplane experimental airplane
Ikarus S-451M	1952		Twin jet engine monoplane experimental airplane
Ikarus S-451MM		1	Twin jet engine monoplane attack airplane
Ikarus SB-1		22	License built single piston engine biplane trainer
Ikarus ŠB-1		24	License built single piston engine biplane trainer
Ikarus SIM-VIII		2 (Note: An additional 3 aircraft were built by Rogožarski.)	Single piston engine monoplane touring airplane
Ikarus Sivi Soko	1928	1	Single piston engine biplane trainer
Ikarus SM	1924	42	Single piston engine biplane flying boat trainer
Ikarus T-451MM		1	Twin jet engine monoplane trainer

==== Buses ====
The historical models under Ikarus brand are:

- IK-4 (solo bus based on Leyland chassis, produced in the early 1970s)
- IK-5A / IK-5B (solo and articulated based on MAN Metrobus (de) license, produced in 1972-1981)
- IK-61 (solo, Raba D2156 engine, manual transmission) produced in the 1970s
- IK-83 (solo, FAP chassis, FAMOS 2 F-207 engine, manual transmission) produced in the 1970s
- IK-102 (solo, MAN D2866 engine, automatic VOITH transmission) produced until 1996
- IK-105 / IK-108 / IK-110B / IK-115 (solo, Raba D2156 engine, manual transmission) produced until 1988
- IK-111B (solo, MAN D2866 engine, manual transmission) produced until 1996
- IK-160B / IK-180 (articulated, Raba D2156 engine, manual transmission) produced until 1988
- IK-160P (articulated, SW680 engine ) produced for the Polish market until 1989
- IK-161B (articulated, MAN D2866 engine, manual transmission) produced until 1996
- IK-161R (articulated, Raba D2156 engine, manual transmission) produced until 1996
- IK-166 (articulated, MAN D2866 engine, automatic VOITH transmission) produced until 1996

The historical models under Ikarbus brand are:

- IK-101 (solo, MAN engine)
- IK-102 (solo, RABA engine)
- IK-201 (articulated, horizontal MAN engine)
- IK-202 (articulated, horizontal RABA engine)
- IK-203 (articulated, horizontal Mercedes engine)

== See also ==
- Aircraft industry of Serbia
- List of companies of the Socialist Federal Republic of Yugoslavia
