= Konjović =

Konjović (Serbian Cyrillic: Коњовић, from Serbian "Konj" which means "Horse") is a popular Serbian surname.

It may refer to:

- Dimitrije Konjović, Serbian naval officer, pilot and businessman
- Milan Konjović, Serbian painter
- Petar Konjović, Serbian composer
- Đorđe Konjović, Serbian basketball player
