= Ikarus ŠM =

1920s Yugoslavian flying boat

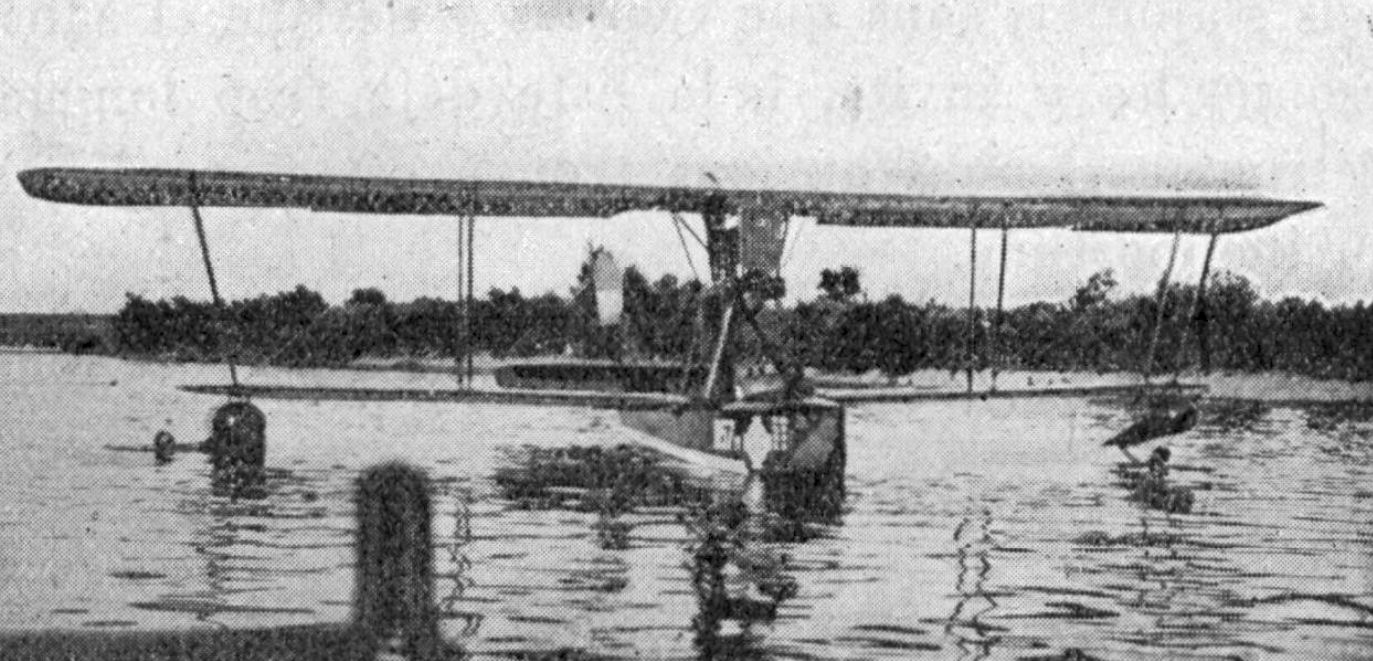
- Training flying boat Ikarus ŠM

General information
- Type: Training biplane flying boat
- Manufacturer: Ikarus
- Designer: Josip Mikl
- Primary user: Yugoslav Royal Navy
- Number built: 42

History
- Introduction date: 1925
- First flight: 1924

The Ikarus ŠM (Serbian Cyrillic: Икарус ШМ), ŠM (for Školski Mornarički, School Navy) was the first design of Eng. Josip Mikl for the Yugoslav company Ikarus, it was a side-by-side two-seat biplane flying boat powered by a 100 hp (75 kW) Mercedes engine. The aircraft used for training by the Yugoslav Royal Navy.

== Development ==
During 1921 and 1922, the engineer Joseph Mikl and his colleagues from the Air Force arsenal made design and manufacturing drawings of the new training biplane seaplane. Mikl engineer's drawings seaplane offered the Ministry of the Army and Navy of the Kingdom of Serbs, Croats and Slovenes, who bought them for his Naval Aviation. The contract was signed in early 1924. Kingdom SHS free ceded drawings seaplane factory "Ikarus", which started working on the first batch of six aircraft.

The prototype was completed by the end of October and the first flight took place on November 10, 1924th, the winter quarters of the Danube in Novi Sad. Test pilot was Dimitrije Konjović. Test flights were carried out by 25 November. Official government commission on the basis of test flights concluded that the seaplane fully meets the requirements. The official name of the plane was "ŠM", an abbreviation of the name of "school-marine". Members of the Naval Aviation seaplane popularly called the "šimika". In late April Kumboru 1925th made the official submission of the Naval Aviation of the first batch of six aircraft. During the 1925th The two still have delivered a series of six aircraft. They were all equipped Czechoslovak Blesk engines, a 100 hp.

During serial production aircraft Ikarus ŠM dimensions have not changed but are shipped with different engines of Czechoslovakia Blesk 100 hp, and the German Mercedes engines of 100, 120 and 160 hp. Ikarus ŠM planes with different engines had different flight characteristics.

== Operational history ==
Produced a total of 42 aircraft Ikarus SM. Ikarus SM in the Yugoslav Royal Navy used for 18 years until April 1941. year. "Šimika" was a good plane to train because he was well manageable by rough seas, and thanks to the stepped hull, easily taking off the water. "Šimika" is mainly used for basic training at the Naval Air Force in pilota school. In addition to training, Ikarus ŠM are often used for auxiliary tasks such as transport officers, and mail orders, as well as mapping and hydrological research, and towing targets during firing exercises. ŠM.1 variant was used for reconnaissance the coast, for keeping track of the torpedo, the detection of minefields, and for the correction of coastal artillery fire synergies and coordination of naval and ground forces. Lieutenant Eugene Šoštarić has set a record in the first Yugoslav dostignutoj altitude, October 29, 1929th when in Divulje ŠM one standard engine with 120 HP reached a height of 6720 meters. At the beginning of the 1936th year, two "Šimika" assigned to aero-clubs in Split and Susak. According to Italian sources, 1941. were captured four defective aircraft Ikarus ŠM, serial numbers 7, 23, 26, 57, and about their fate is not known anything assumed to have been destroyed.

== Variants ==
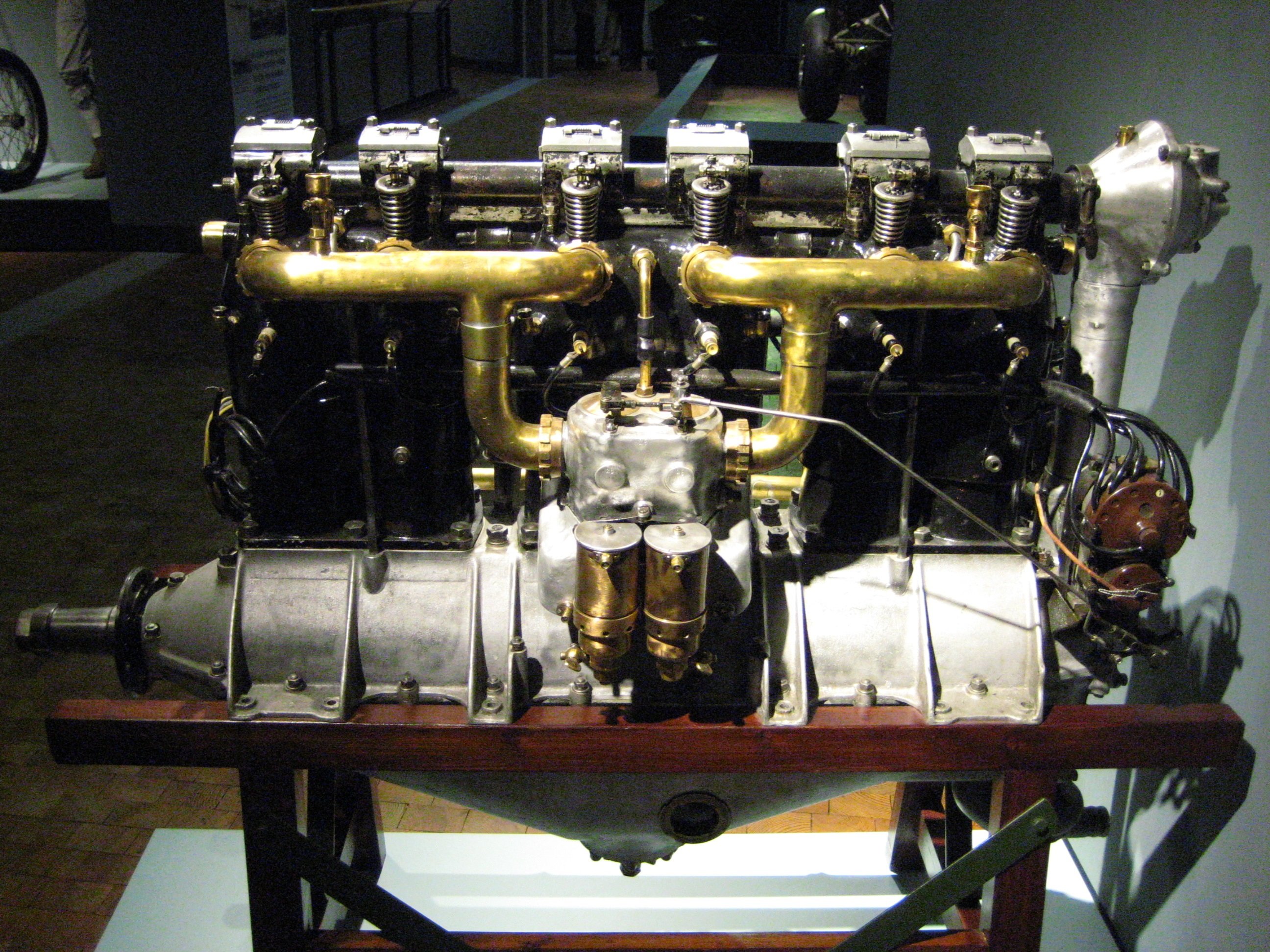
Engine Mercedes D II installed on aircraft Ikarus ŠM

Depending on built engines have changed and some features seaplane Ikarus ŠM. These changed characteristics are presented in tables.

Characteristics	Meas.u.	ŠM 100	ŠM 120	ŠM 160
Mercedes Engine D II	KS	100	120	160
Engine Power	kW	74	88	117
Empty weight	kg	730	800	900
Max takeoff weight	kg	1.010	1.150	1.180
Max speed	km/h	120	126	140
Range	km	360	280	280
Ceiling	m	3.000	5.000	5.000

== Operators ==
Kingdom of Yugoslavia

- Yugoslav Royal Navy

(RAF)

== Specifications (ŠM) ==
General characteristics

- Crew: 2
- Length: 9.75 m (32 ft 0 in)
- Upper wingspan: 14.5 m (47 ft 7 in)
- Lower wingspan: 11.5 m (37 ft 9 in)
- Height: 3.89 m (12 ft 9 in)
- Wing area: 35.00 m^{2} (376.7 sq ft)
- Empty weight: 730 kg (1,609 lb)
- Max takeoff weight: 1,010 kg (2,227 lb)
- Powerplant: 1 × Mercedes, D II (6-cylinder line engine), 74 kW (99 hp)
- Propellers: 2-bladed

Performance

- Maximum speed: 120 km/h (75 mph, 65 kn)
- Range: 360 km (220 mi, 190 nmi)
- Service ceiling: 3,000 m (9,800 ft)

== See also ==
Aircraft of comparable role, configuration, and era

- Ikarus IO

Related lists

- List of seaplanes and flying boats
