= Ikarbus IK-206 =

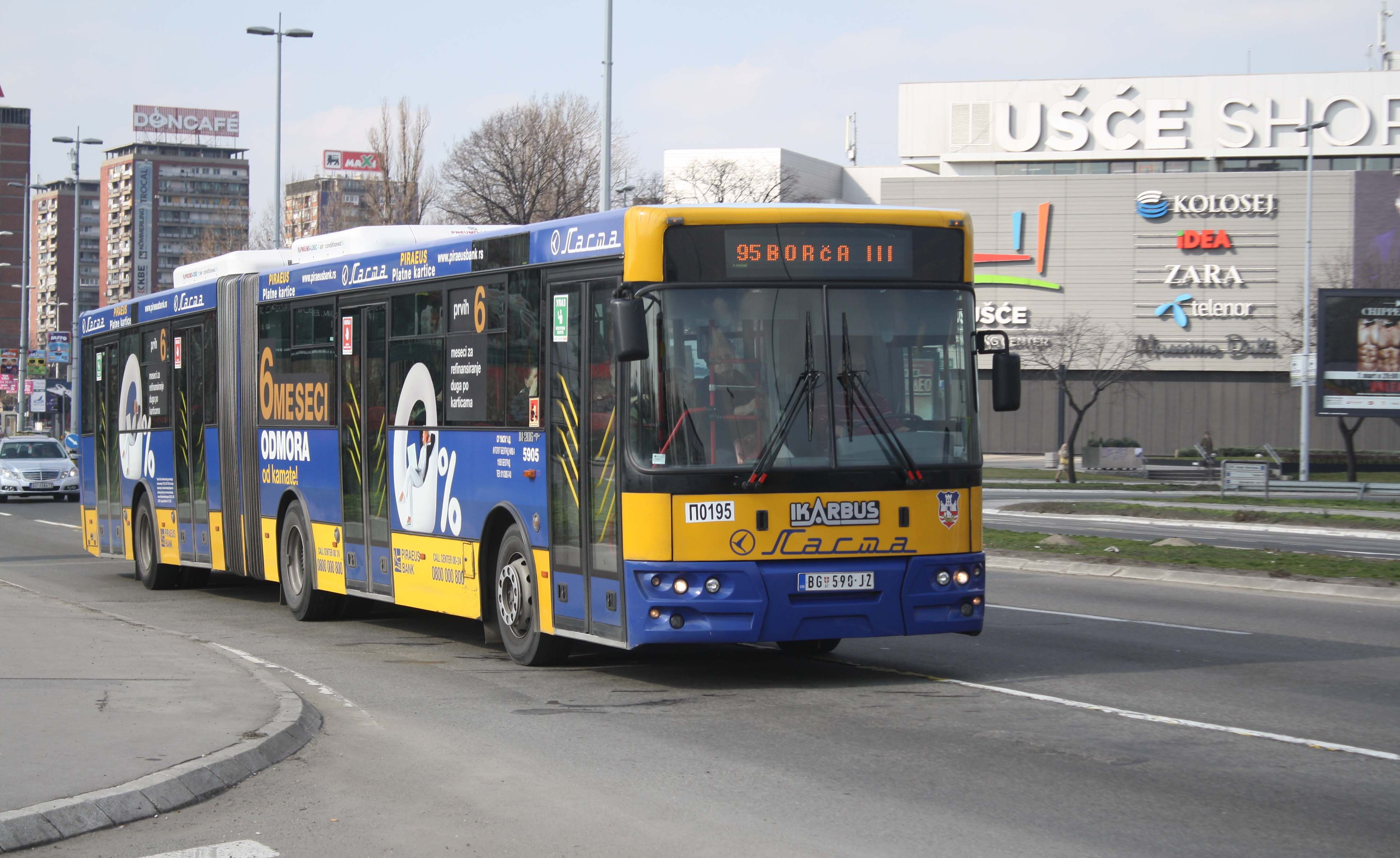

Overview
- Manufacturer: Ikarbus
- Production: 2006-present
- Assembly: Zemun, Serbia

Body and chassis
- Class: Articulated city bus
- Related: Ikarbus IK-202; Ikarbus IK-203

Powertrain
- Engine: MAN D2066 LUH 11 (E4) (199 kW)
- Transmission: Voith 864.5 automatic

Dimensions
- Length: 17.9 m
- Width: 2.5 m

Chronology
- Predecessor: Ikarbus IK-201
- Successor: Ikarbus IK-218

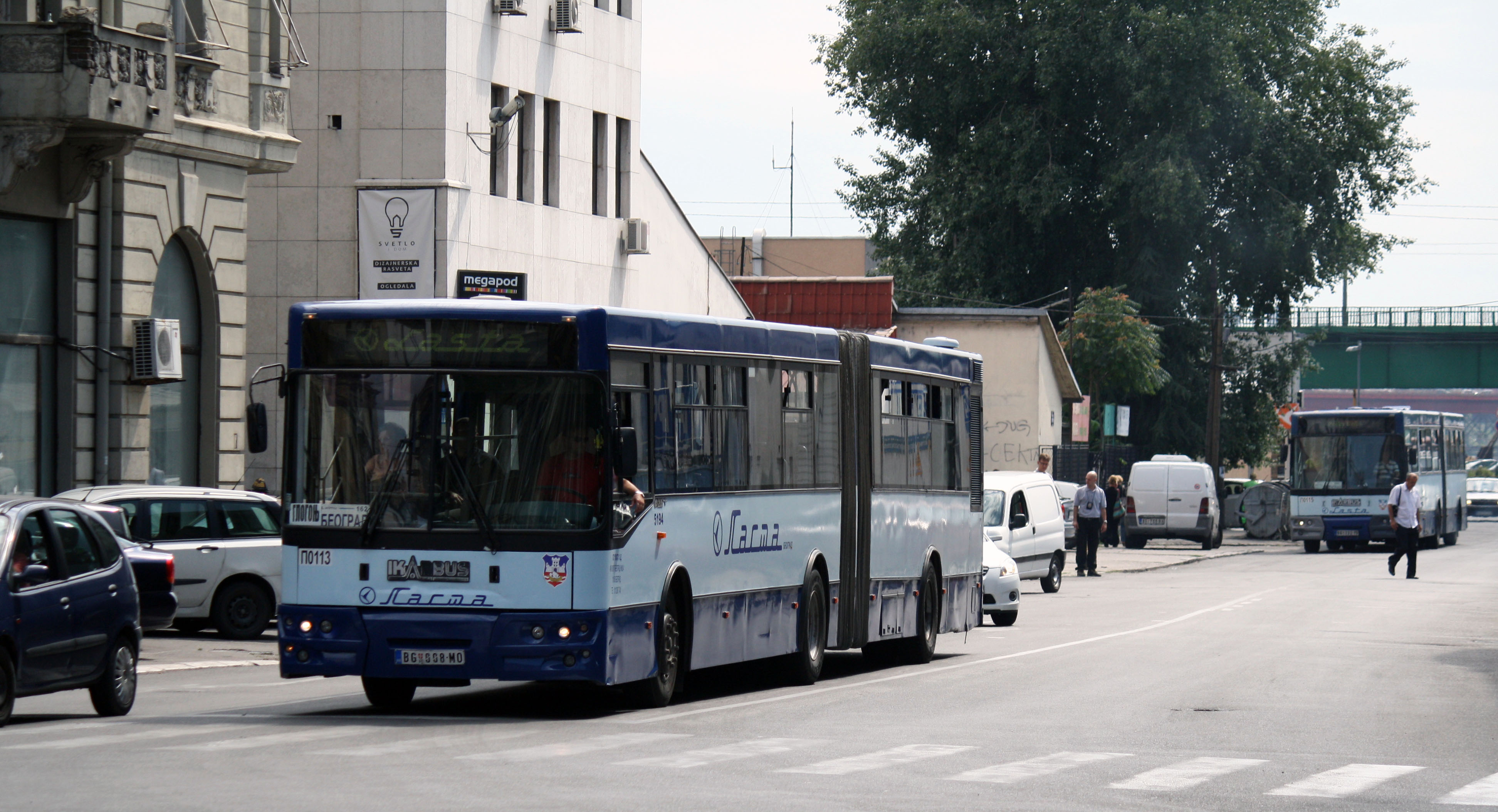
IK-206 and IK-201 of Lasta Beograd.

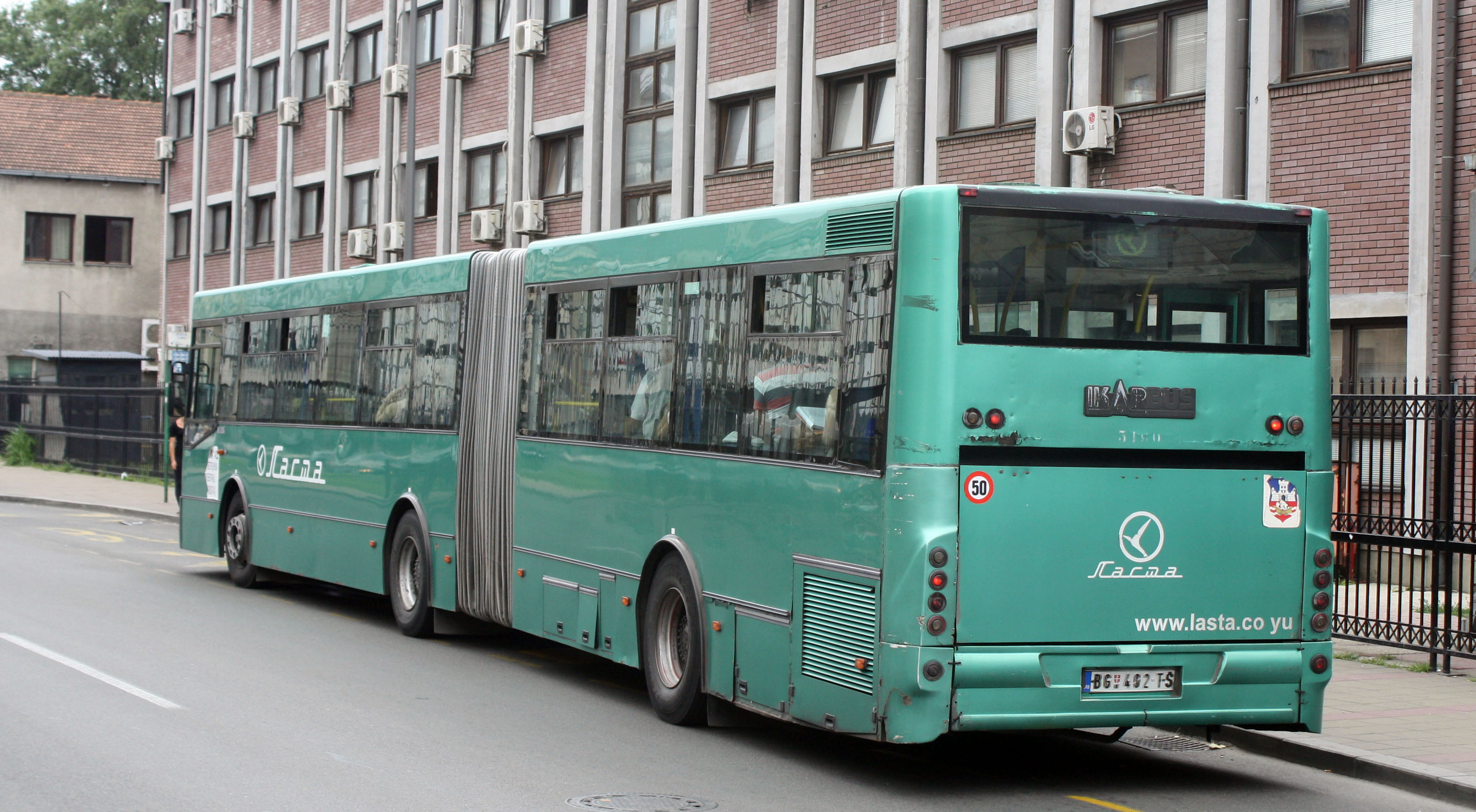
First IK-206.

Ikarbus IK-206 is an articulated city bus built by the Serbian bus manufacturer Ikarbus from 2006.

The model IK-206 was developed from previous Ikarbus city articulated models, Ikarbus IK-201 and its variants, IK-202 and IK-203. The production has started in 2006 and same year the production of older IK-201, IK-202, and IK-203 models has been ceased. The main difference between those three models and new IK-206 is that IK-201, IK-202 and IK-203 had horizontal engine mounted under the floor between the front and middle A- and B-axles, and only the B-axle is powered, while IK-206 has rear-mounted vertical MAN engine. IK-206 is visually similar to older IK-201, IK-203 and IK-203, due it has modernized and more comfortable interior design, modern windows and front bezel headlights.

It has 44 passenger seats made plastic on foundation of steel bars and bars for holding. Doors are four two-wing, pneumatically controlled and opened to the inside. There are seven windows with slide rule and four roof airshafts. The heating system consists from heater on front wall, three heaters in passengers compartment and big aircondition on roof. Roof and sides are isolated.

The IK-206 is today used mainly by Lasta Beograd, Lastra Lazarevac and Sarajevo public transport (GRAS). It was not introduced in service with GSP Beograd, due to the decision of the city to buy only low-flor new buses.

== Technical data ==
- Maximum speed - 72 km/h
- Number of passengers - 160
- Weight of empty vehicle - 14100 kg
- Battery - 2 x 12V / 180 Ah
- Tank volume - 300 l
- Suspension - Air with telescopic shock-absorbers and torsion stabilizer
- Steering-wheel - PPT (ZF) / 8045

=== Dimension ===
- Length - 17.99 m
- Width - 2.5 m
- Height - 3.3 m
- Height inside - 2.26 m
- Height of floor from the ground - 0.75 m
- Height of lowest stair from the ground - 0.345 m
- Distance between front axles - 5.65 m
- Distance between rear axles - 6.045 m
- Front end to the front wheels - 2.82 m
- Rear end to the rear wheels - 3.482 m

=== Engines ===
Installed in rear part vertical

- MAN D2066 LUH 11 (E4)

=== Transmission ===
- Voith 864.5 automatic

== See also ==
- List of buses
