= Ikarus IO =

Biplane flying boat produced in Yugoslavia

- Airplane Ikarus IO 2

General information
- Type: Reconnaissance flying boat
- National origin: Yugoslavia
- Manufacturer: Ikarus
- Designer: Josip Mikl
- Status: retired
- Primary user: Yugoslav Royal Navy
- Number built: 38

History
- Introduction date: 1927
- First flight: September 1926

The Ikarus IO (Serbian Cyrillic:Икарус ИО – Извиђач Обални) was a biplane flying boat produced in Yugoslavia in the late 1920s. It was a conventional flying boat design for its day, featuring a large single-bay wing cellule, the staggered wings of slightly uneven span braced with N-struts. The pilot and observer sat side by side in an open cockpit, and a gunner sat in an open position ahead of them, in the bow. The pusher engine and frontal radiator were carried on struts in the inter-plane gap.

== Development ==
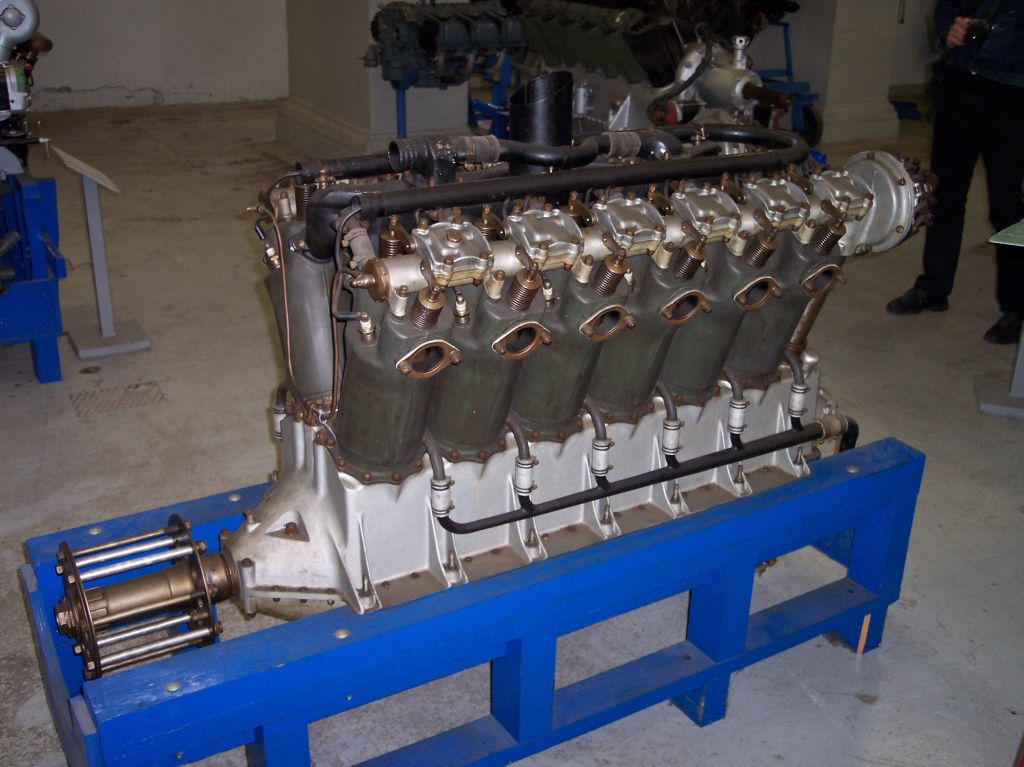
A Liberty L-12, as installed in the Ikarus IO

After the crash of the Ikarus IM prototype reconnaissance seaplane (Serbian Cyrillic:Икарус ИМ – Извиђач Морнарички) with 260 hp (190 kW) BMW IV engine, on 31 May 1926, Ikarus immediately started development of a second reconnaissance seaplane prototype powered by a 4–00 hp (3.0–0.0 kW) Liberty L-12 engine, also designed by Josef Mikl, the Ikarus Technical Manager. The new prototype was named Ikarus IO (Coastal Reconnaissance) and the first test flight took place from the Danube at Novi Sad in September 1926.

After all-round tests, the aircraft was given a positive assessment and the Naval Air Force ordered the first series of 12 aircraft, which were delivered during 1927, serialled 101 to 112. Based on observations arising from the operational use of the aircraft, certain modifications were applied and another 24 modified IOs were ordered, receiving serials 113 to 136. In parallel with the development of the second IO series, Ikarus built prototype aircraft powered by a Loren engine.

The Ikarus IO was a flying boat with completely wooden structure, with wings rounded at the edges and covered with canvas. Auxiliary floats increased the stability of water-borne navigation. The two flight crew members, scout and pilot were seated side by side in parallel and the gunner sat in front of them in an open position with a Scarff ring gun mounting. Painted light gray, the aircraft were used in coastal reconnaissance and bombing roles and could carry about 250 kg (550 lb) of bombs and were armed with a 7.7 mm (0.303 in) Darne machine gun mounted on the gunner's Scarff ring.

== Variants ==
Markings subtypes of these aircraft were fitted with engines, according to [1]:

IO/Li

Coastal Reconnaissance seaplane with 400 hp (300 kW) Liberty L-12, (36 copies + 1 prototype built the 1927th and 1928 when available).

IO/Lo
Coastal Reconnaissance seaplane with 450 hp (340 kW) Lorraine-Dietrich 12Eb, (1 copy – a prototype conversion 1929th year)
IO/Re
Coastal Reconnaissance seaplane with 500 hp (370 kW) Renault 12Ke(1 copy – the prototype of the 1930th year 1937),
IO/Lo
Coastal Reconnaissance seaplane with 400 hp (300 kW) Lorraine Dietrich-12Db, (20 copies – Conversion 1934th year).

== Operational history ==
The IO was used by the Kingdom of SHS / Yugoslavia Navy as a coastal reconnaissance seaplane and light bomber from 1927 until 1941. The aircraft were deployed and served at Divulje, Vodice and Kumbor. Initially the IO suffered a high accident rate and by 1932 only 29 of the 37 production aircraft were still in service. Because of intensive use the Liberty engines were worn out and difficult to support necessitating substitution with Lorraine-Dietrich engines. In January 1941, 4 aircraft remained in service, of which two were airworthy, which were not used in operations before being withdrawn.

== Operators ==
Kingdom of Yugoslavia

- Yugoslav Royal Navy

== Specifications ==
General characteristics

- Crew: 3
- Length: 10.4 m (34 ft 1 in)
- Wingspan: 15.2 m (49 ft 10 in)
- Height: 3.52 m (11 ft 7 in)
- Wing area: 47.5 m^{2} (511 sq ft)
- Empty weight: 1,520 kg (3,351 lb)
- Gross weight: 2,450 kg (5,401 lb)
- Powerplant: 1 × Liberty L-12 45° V-12 water-cooled piston engine, 300 kW (400 hp)

Performance

- Maximum speed: 170 km/h (110 mph, 92 kn)
- Cruise speed: 145 km/h (90 mph, 78 kn)
- Range: 600 km (370 mi, 320 nmi)
- Service ceiling: 4,500 m (14,800 ft)

Armament

== See also ==
- Ikarus ŠM

Related lists

- List of aircraft of World War II
