= Ikarbus IK-202 =

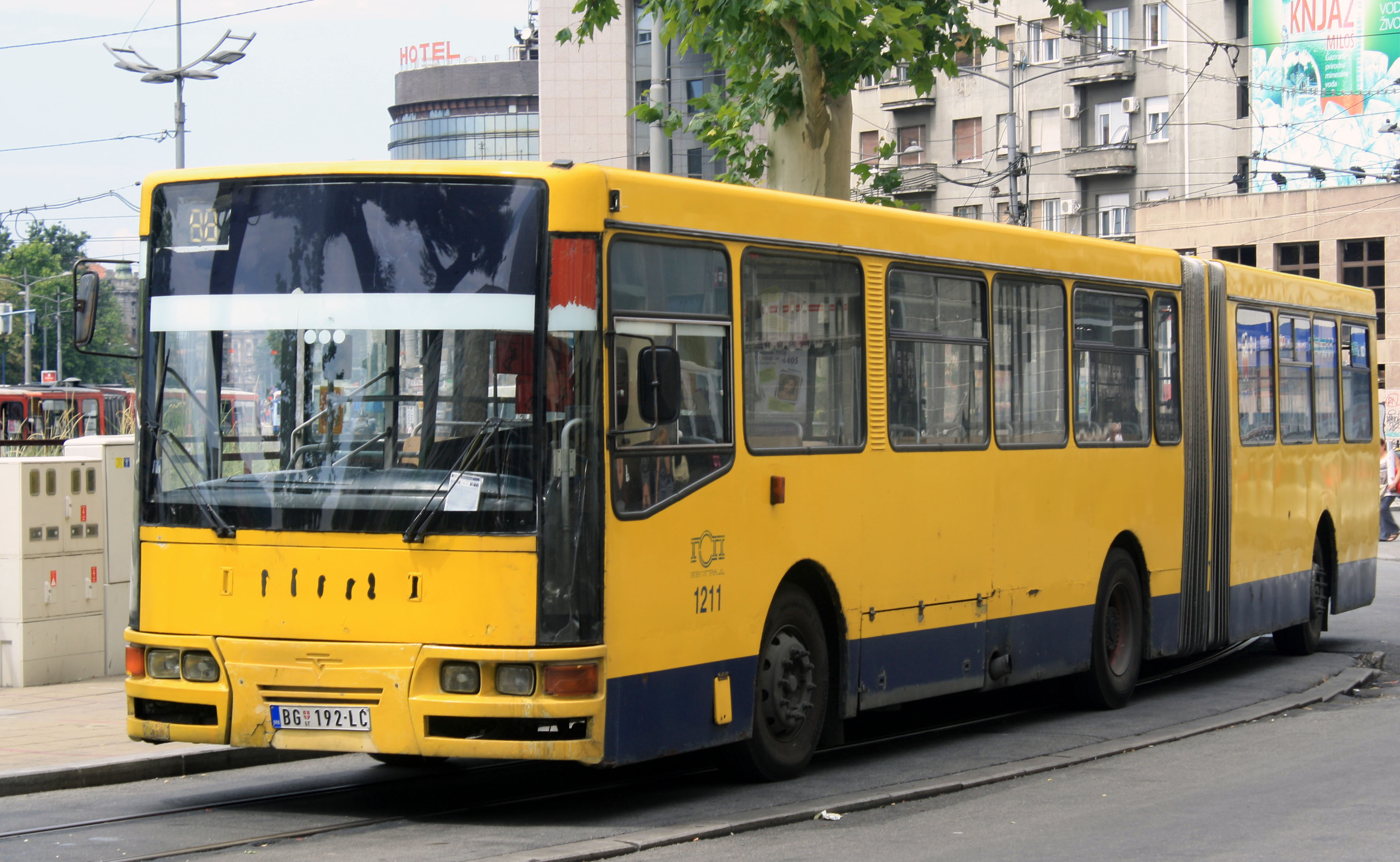

Overview
- Manufacturer: Ikarbus
- Production: 1993−2006
- Assembly: Zemun, Serbia

Body and chassis
- Class: Articulated city bus
- Related: Ikarbus IK-201; Ikarbus IK-203

Powertrain
- Engine: RABA / D10 UTSLL-190 (E2)
- Transmission: ZF S6-85; Voith D864.3E automatic

Dimensions
- Length: 17.0 m
- Width: 2.5 m

Chronology
- Predecessor: Ikarbus IK-167
- Successor: Ikarbus IK-206; Ikarbus IK-218

Ikarbus IK-202 is an articulated city bus built by the Serbian bus manufacturer Ikarbus from 1996 until 2005.

The model IK-202 was developed from Ikarbus IK-201. In 1996 the production of older IK-161 model has been ceased. IK-202 is similar to IK-201, and IK-203 models. The main difference between those three models is that IK-201 has MAN engine, IK-202 has RABA engine and IK-203 has Mercedes engine. The further development of those models which has replaced them in production is IK-206, with vertical MAN engine which has replaced IK-202 from production.

It has 39 passenger seats made of two pieces of plywood (seat and back) on foundation of steel bars and bars for holding. Doors are four two-wing, pneumatically controlled and opened to the inside. There are seven windows with slide rule and four roof airshafts. The heating system consists from heater on front wall, three heaters in passengers compartment. Roof and sides are isolated.

The IK-202 is today used by GSP Belgrade and other public bus operators in Serbia but in smaller numbers than IK-201. Several IK-202 have been exported to Russia.

== Technical data ==
- Maximum speed - 72 km/h
- Number of passengers - 160
- Weight of empty vehicle - 14100 kg
- Battery - 2 x 12V / 180 Ah
- Tank volume - 300 l
- Suspension - Air with telescopic shock-absorbers and torsion stabilizer
- Steering-wheel - PPT (ZF) / 8045

=== Dimension ===
- Length - 17.04 m
- Width - 2.5 m
- Height - 3.2 m
- Height inside - 2.05 m
- Height of floor from the ground - 0.9 m
- Height of lowest stair from the ground - 0.345 m
- Distance between front axles - 5.25 m
- Distance between rear axles - 6.1 m
- Front end to the front wheels - 2.82 m
- Rear end to the rear wheels - 2.9 m

=== Maneuvering capabilities ===
- Smallest diameter of the most protruded wheel - 17.5 m
- Smallest diameter of turning - 22.5 m

=== Engines ===
Installed horizontally between axles

- RABA / D10 UTSLL-190 (E2) - 190 kW (1900 rpm)

=== Transmission ===
- ZF S6-85
- Voith D864.3E automatic

== See also ==
- List of buses
