= Ikarus 451 =

Yugoslavian research aircraft family

451
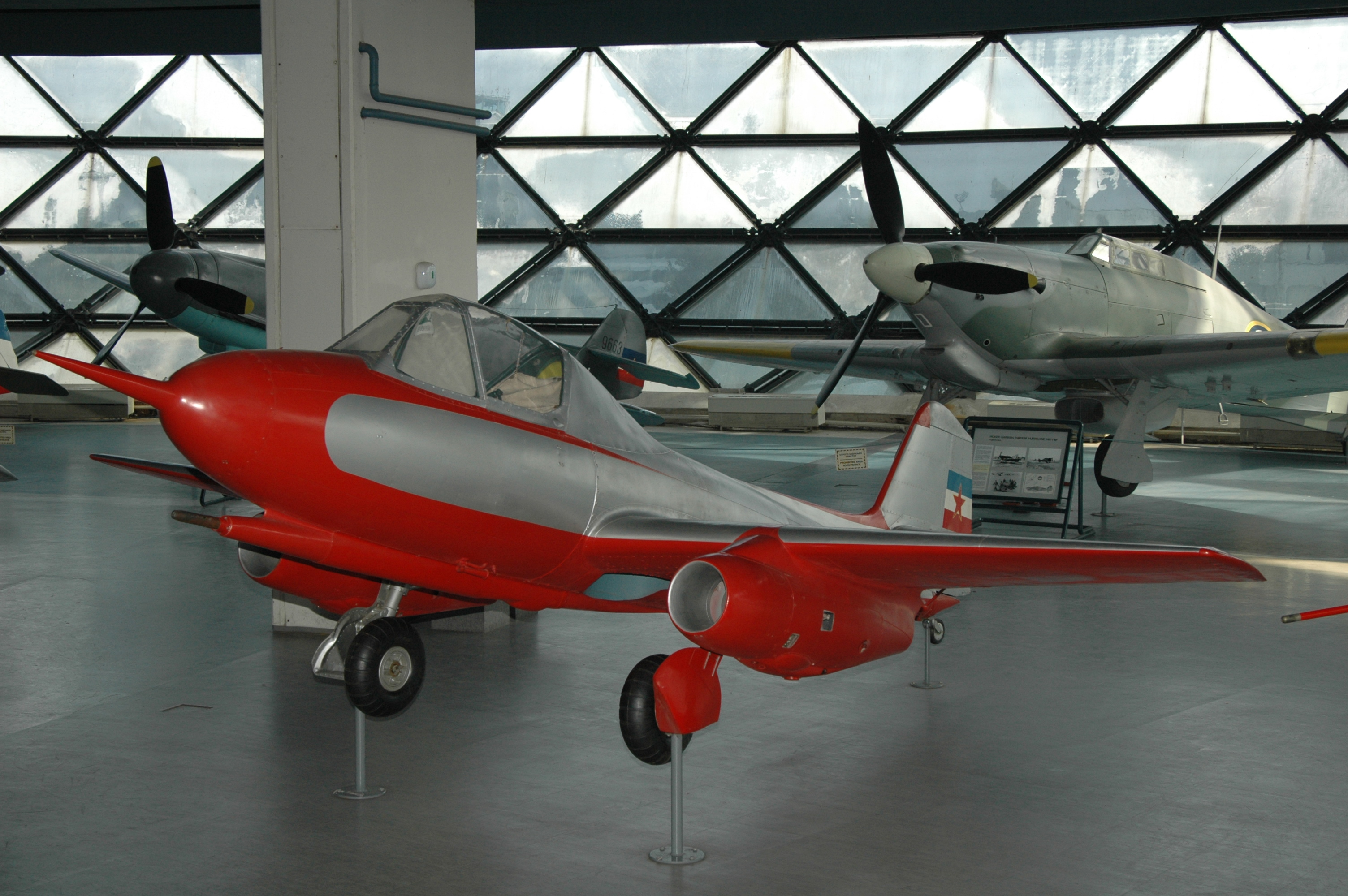
- The first Yugoslavian jet aircraft Ikarus S-451 M on display at the Aeronautical Museum Belgrade.

General information
- Type: Research aircraft
- National origin: Yugoslavia
- Manufacturer: Ikarus

History
- First flight: 25 October 1952 (Type 451M)

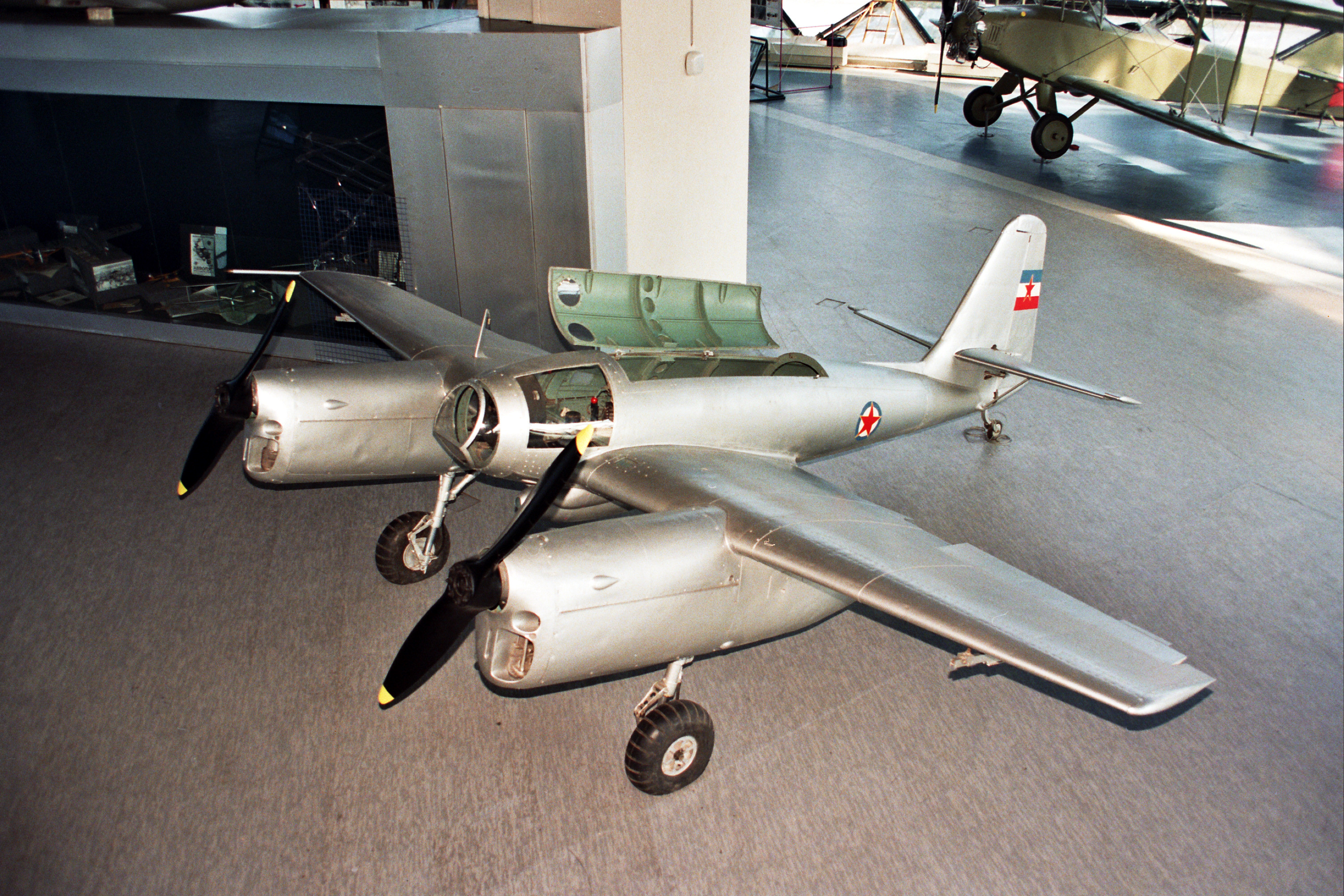
Ikarus S-451

The Ikarus 451 is a family of research aircraft designs built in the former Yugoslavia in the 1950s by the Belgrade-based manufacturer Ikarus (now Ikarbus), all sharing the same basic airframe, but differing in powerplants and cockpit arrangements. One member of the family Ikarus 451M became the first domestically-built jet aircraft to fly in Yugoslavia on 25 October 1952. It was succeeded by the Ikarus 452.

== Design, development, and variants ==
To research prone pilot cockpit arrangements and controls, the Yugoslav Government Aircraft Factories developed the Ikarus 232 Pionir, a small twin-engined low-wing monoplane, powered by 2x 48 kW (65 hp) Walter Mikron III piston engines.

=== Type 451 ===
An enlarged version of the Pionir was developed as the Type 451, powered by 2x 120 kW (160 hp) Walter Minor 6-III six-cylinder piston engines of 120 kW (160 hp) each. The Type 451 had a 6.7 m (22 ft) wingspan, a maximum speed of 335 km/h (182 knots), and a ceiling of 4750 m (15,570 ft). It first flew in 1952.

It also accommodated the pilot in prone position, but was an otherwise conventional low-wing monoplane with retractable tailwheel undercarriage, the main units of which retracted backwards into the engine nacelles mounted below the wings.

=== 451M Mlazni ===
By the end of 1952, the Type 451 was followed by the 451M Mlazni ("Jet") which had conventional seating for the pilot. In place of the two Walter Minor 6-III inline engines of the original Ikarus 451, the 451M was fitted with Turbomeca Palas turbojets.

In this version, the undercarriage retracted inwards. Provision was made to carry one 20 mm Hispano Suiza 404A cannon under the fuselage, plus six RS rockets under the wings. Further developments were aimed at developing a viable military aircraft from this basic design.

=== S-451M Zolja ===
The S-451M Zolja ("Wasp") that flew in 1954 featured a stretched fuselage, folding wings, and redesigned engine nacelles, now in the same plane as the wing rather than being hung under them. In 1960 a S-451M Zolja set an airspeed record with a takeoff weight from 1,000 kg (2,200 lb) to 1,750 kg (3,860 lb), flying at 500.2 km/hour.

=== J-451MM Stršljen ===
The S-451 Zolja was developed into an armed version, the J-451MM Stršljen ("Hornet") intended for the close air support (Jurisnik) role, with Turbomeca Marbore engines boasting over twice the thrust of those used on earlier aircraft, and an armament increased to two HS.404 cannon carried under the fuselage. The J-451MM Stršljen also differed from preceding designs in having a tricycle undercarriage.

=== S-451MM Matica ===
The J-451MM Stršljen configuration then formed the basis for the S-451MM Matica ("Queen bee") two-seat trainer that set an airspeed record for aircraft weighing between 1,750 kg (3,860 lb) and 3,000 kg (6,600 lb), achieving 750.34 km/hour (466.24 mph) in 1957. It was also developed into the T-451MM Stršljen II single-seat aerobatics trainer.

No member of the family was produced in any number. The 451, 451M, and J-451MM are all preserved at the Aeronautical Museum Belgrade.

== Variants summary ==
=== 232 Pionir ===
(Pionir – Pioneer) A small twin-engined prone-pilot research aircraft, powered by 2x 48 kW (65 hp) Walter Mikron III piston engines. (1 built)

=== S-451 ===
A larger, more powerful version of the Pionir, powered by 2x 120 kW (160 hp) Walter Minor 6-III piston engines and also incorporating a prone pilot cockpit. (1 built)

=== S-451M ===
(Mlazni – Jet). Derived directly from the S-451 airframe, the S-451M substituted Turbomeca Palas turbojet engines for the piston engines, in underslung nacelles at the same positions on the wing and conventional cockpit.

=== S-451M Zolja ===
(Zolja – Wasp). Flown in 1954, the S-451M Zolja featured a stretched fuselage, folding wings, and engine nacelles centred on the wing chordline. Powered by 2x 1.57 kN (353 lbf) Turbomeca Palas 056A turbojet engines; set a world speed record in its class in 1960.

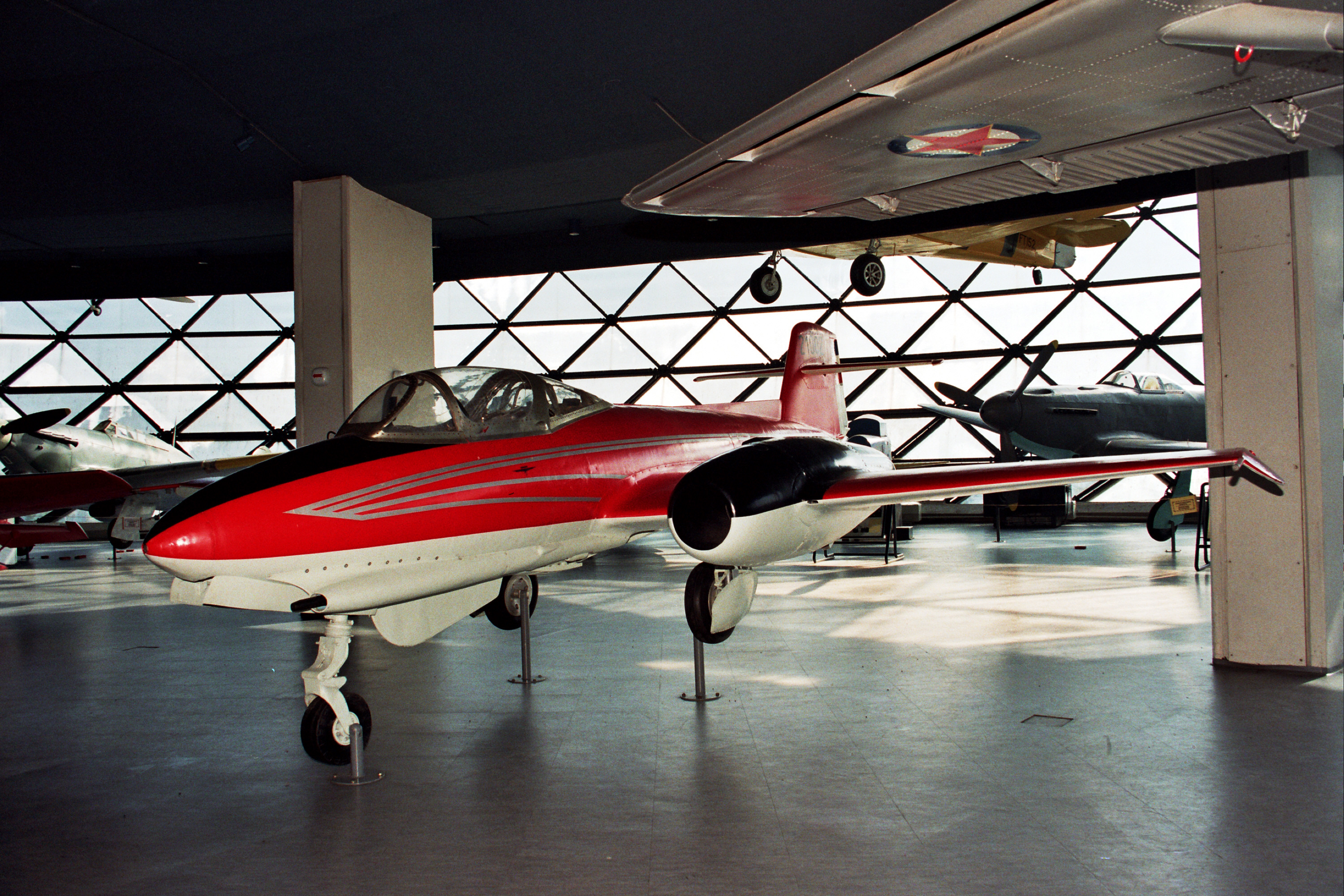
Ikarus J-451MM Stršljen II from 1956 (J-451MM Hornet) on display at the Aeronautical Museum Belgrade

=== J-451MM Stršljen ===
J – Jurisnik – (close air support) (Stršljen – Hornet). The intended production close support version with tricycle undercarriage, Turbomeca Marbore engines and cannon armament. (1 built).

=== S-451MM Matica ===
(Matica – Queen bee). Two-seat trainer version, used for a world speed record in 1957.

=== T-451MM Stršljen II ===
A single seat aerobatic trainer, fitted with more ammunition and maximum ordnance weight was slightly increased.

== Specifications (451M) ==
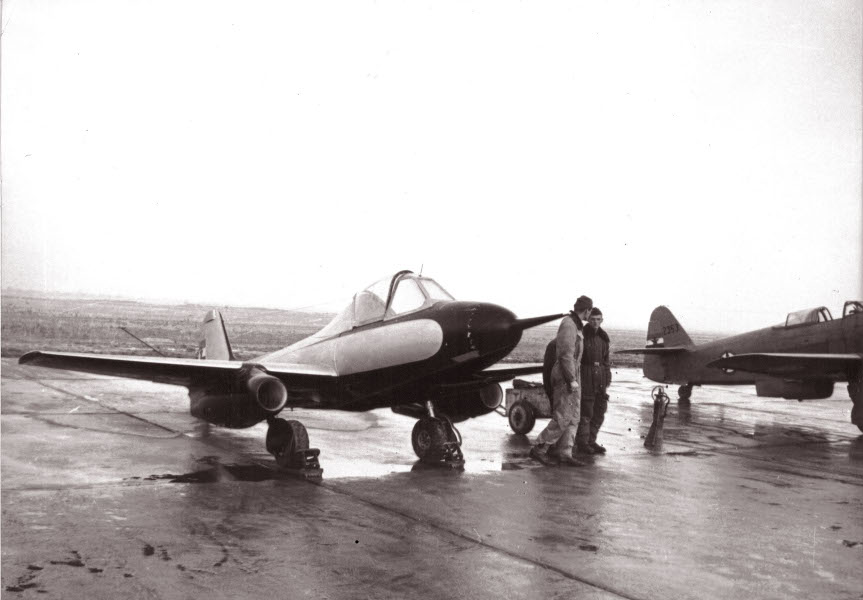
Ikarus S-451M – Testing in Aeronautical Testing Center in 1950s.

General characteristics

- Crew: One pilot
- Length: 7.45 m (24 ft 5 in)
- Wingspan: 6.78 m (22 ft 3 in)
- Height: 2.32 m (7 ft 7 in)
- Wing area: 8.0 m^{2} (86 sq ft)
- Empty weight: 897 kg (1,977 lb)
- Gross weight: 1,350 kg (2,980 lb)
- Powerplant: 2 × Turbomeca Palas 056A , 1.5 kN (330 lbf) thrust each

Performance

- Maximum speed: 470 km/h (290 mph, 250 kn)
- Range: 300 km (190 mi, 170 nmi)
- Service ceiling: 8,500 m (27,900 ft)

== See also ==
- Ikarus 452
