= Ikarus 452M =

Ikarus 452

General information
- Type: Research aircraft
- National origin: Yugoslavia
- Manufacturer: Ikarus
- Designer: Dragoljub Beslin
- Number built: 2

History
- First flight: 24 July 1953

The Ikarus 452M (B-452-2) was a Yugoslav experimental aircraft first revealed in 1953. It was Yugoslavia’s first swept-wing light jet fighter-interceptor. The all-metal aircraft featured retractable nose-wheel landing gear and was the first to incorporate a domestically produced light metal alloy for its fuselage skin.

A distinctive aspect of the design was its twin-fin tail unit, an uncommon feature in Yugoslav aviation. The fins were mounted on beams extending from the wings and connected by a V-shaped stabilizer. The aircraft had a 36º wing sweep, with plans to add slats for improved performance. It was powered by two Palas 056A turbojet engines arranged vertically in the fuselage, each fed by separate air intakes. As a technology demonstrator, its armament was minimal, consisting of two 12.7mm Browning machine guns.

It was publicly revealed on April 30, 1953. However, a test flight on July 24 ended in an emergency landing due to fuel system failure, severely damaging the aircraft and injuring the test pilot.

To address inadequate engine thrust, a three-engine variant (B-452-3) was proposed, with upgraded armament, but it remained at the design stage. A later iteration, the B-452-4, incorporated a more powerful Turbomeca Marbore II engine, an enlarged airframe, and twin 20mm cannons. Intended for both interception and ground attack, it was designed to carry air-to-surface high-velocity aircraft rockets (HVARs). Despite its modern concept, the project was ultimately shelved in favor of the B-12 interceptor.

Results of the experimental programme provided a basis for the production of the Soko Galeb.

== Specifications ==
General characteristics

- Crew: One pilot
- Length: 5.97 m (19 ft 7 in)
- Wingspan: 5.25 m (17 ft 2 in)
- Height: 1.77 m (5 ft 9 in)
- Gross weight: 1,100 kg (2,420 lb)
- Powerplant: 2 × Turbomeca Palas 056A , 1.5 kN (330 lbf) thrust each

Performance

- Maximum speed: 780 km/h (466 mph, 405 kn)
- Endurance: 1 hours 15 minutes

Armament

- 4 x 12.7mm M3 Browning machine guns (two nose gun ports per side)

== See also ==
- Ikarus 451M (first domestically-built Yugoslav jet aircraft)
- Ikarus 453
