= Ikarbus IK-201 =

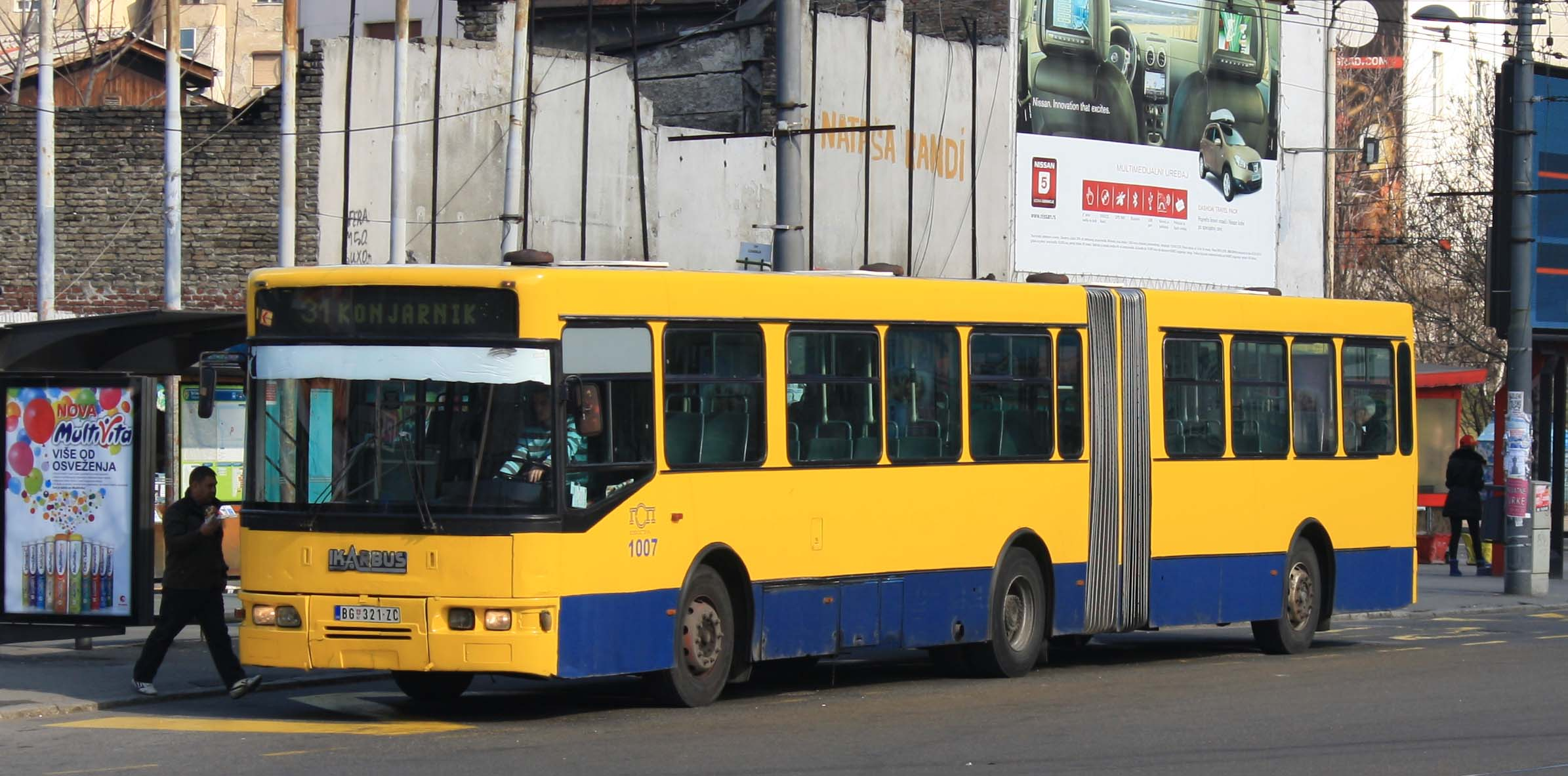

Overview
- Manufacturer: Ikarbus
- Production: 1993−2006
- Assembly: Zemun, Serbia

Body and chassis
- Class: Articulated city bus
- Doors: 4
- Related: Ikarbus IK-202; Ikarbus IK-203

Powertrain
- Engine: MAN D2866 LUH-22 (Euro 2) (191 kW); MAN D2866 LUH-23 (Euro 3)
- Transmission: ZF S6-85, Voith D863.3 automatic

Dimensions
- Length: 17,040 mm (670.9 in)
- Width: 2,500 mm (98.4 in)
- Height: 3,200 mm (126.0 in)

Chronology
- Predecessor: Ikarbus IK-167
- Successor: Ikarbus IK-206, Ikarbus IK-218

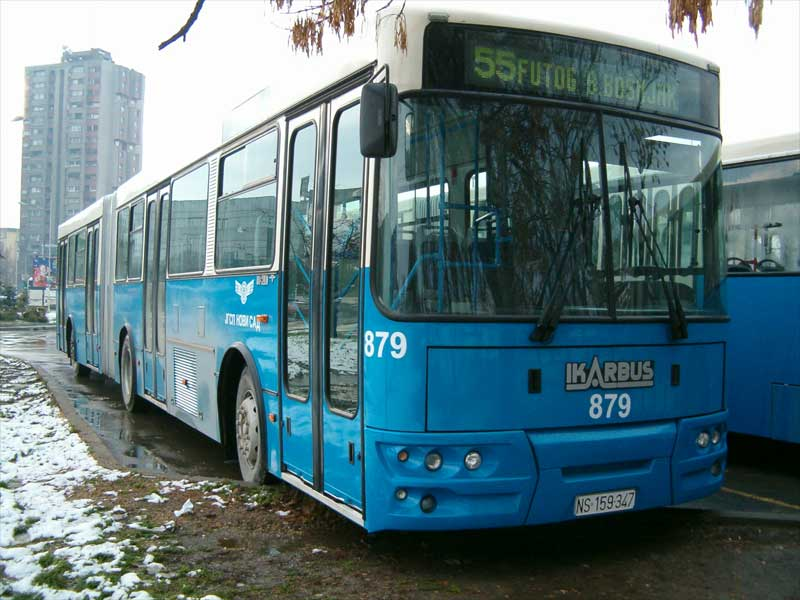
IK-201 of JGSP Novi Sad.

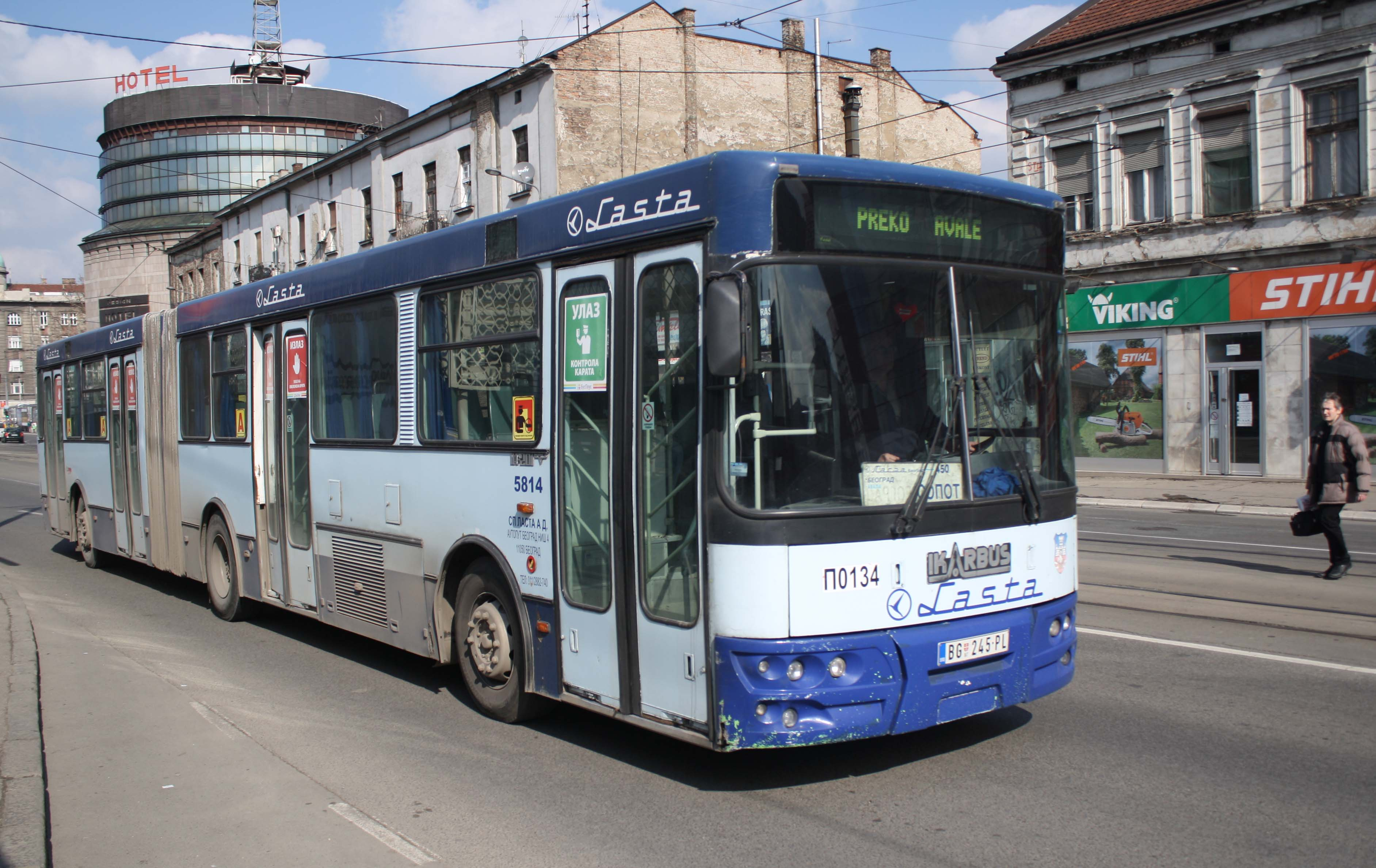
IK-201 of Lasta Beograd.

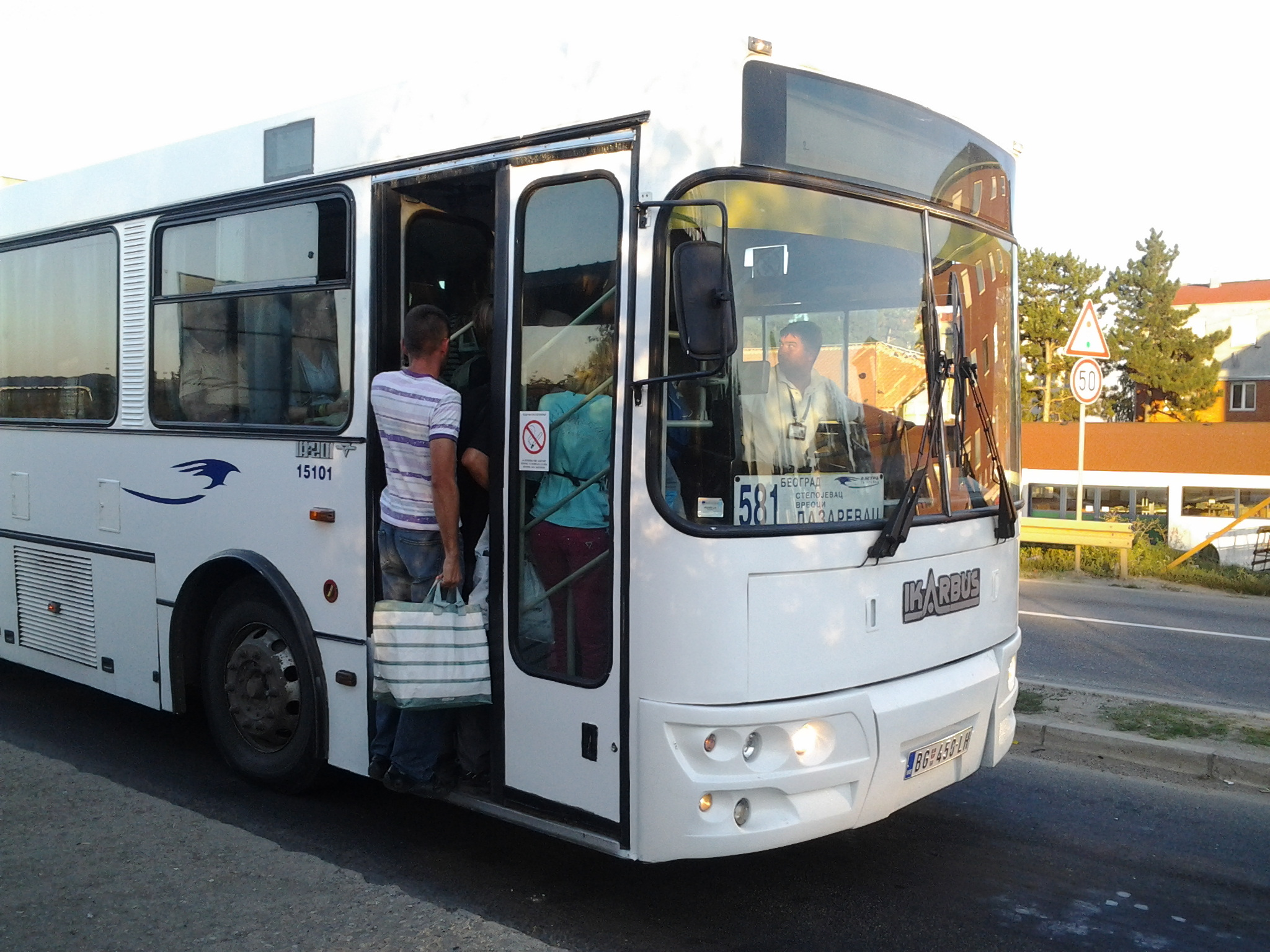
IK-201 of Lastra Lazarevac.

Ikarbus IK-201 is an articulated city bus built by the Serbian bus manufacturer Ikarbus from 1993 until 2006.

The model IK-201 was developed from prototype model, being designated as Ikarbus IK-201L9 (L stands for luksuzno - luxury, due to the equipment used on this model). In 1996 the production of older IK-161 model has been ceased. IK-201 is similar to IK-202, and IK-203 models. The main difference between those three models is that IK-201 has MAN engine, IK-202 has Rába engine and IK-203 has Mercedes-Benz engine. The further development of those models which has replaced them in production is IK-206, with vertical MAN engine.

It has 39 passenger seats made of two pieces of plywood (seat and back) on foundation of steel bars and bars for holding. Doors are four two-wing, pneumatically controlled and opened to the inside. There are seven windows with slide rule and four roof airshafts. The heating system consists from heater on front wall, three heaters in passengers compartment. Roof and sides are isolated.

The IK-201 is today used mainly by GSP Belgrade and JGSP Novi Sad. Lasta Beograd, Lastra Lazarevac, JP Subotica-Trans and other public bus operators also use it.

== Technical data ==
- Maximum speed - 72 km/h
- Number of passengers - 160
- Weight of empty vehicle - 14100 kg
- Battery - 2 x 12V / 180 Ah
- Tank volume - 300 l
- Suspension - Air with telescopic shock-absorbers and torsion stabilizer
- Steering-wheel - PPT (ZF) / 8045

=== Dimension ===
- Length - 17.04 m
- Width - 2.5 m
- Height - 3.2 m
- Height inside - 2.05 m
- Height of floor from the ground - 0.9 m
- Height of lowest stair from the ground - 0.345 m
- Distance between front axles - 5.25 m
- Distance between rear axles - 6.1 m
- Front end to the front wheels - 2.82 m
- Rear end to the rear wheels - 2.9 m

=== Maneuvering capabilities ===
- Smallest diameter of the most protruded wheel - 17.5 m
- Smallest diameter of turning - 21.6 m

=== Engines ===
Installed horizontally between axles

- MAN D2866 LUH-22 (E2) - 191 kW (1900 rpm)
- MAN D2866 LUH-23 (E3) - 191 kW (1900 rpm)

=== Transmission ===
- ZF S6-85
- Voith D863.3 automatic

== See also ==
- List of buses
