= Ikarus 231 =

Courier aircraft built in Yugoslavia

General information
- Type: Courier service aircraft
- National origin: Yugoslavia
- Manufacturer: Fabrika aero i hidroplana Ikarus A.D. Zemun - Belgrade
- Designer: Eng. Dušan Stankov
- Status: inactive
- Primary user: SFR Yugoslav Air Force
- Number built: 2

History
- Introduction date: prototype
- First flight: 1948
- Retired: 1958

The Ikarus 231 was a courier aircraft built in Yugoslavia by Ikarus Aircraft during the late 1940s.

== Design and development ==
The Ikarus 231 was a two-seat, low-wing monoplane of cantilever construction. It was similar to the Ikarus 211 trainer but had an enclosed cabin intended for courier service. The prototype flew in 1948 and was eventually handed over to the Yugoslav Air Force, which it served until 1958. The second prototype, which also flew in 1948, served until 1952, after which it was scrapped.

== Specifications ==
Data from

General characteristics

- Crew: 2
- Length: 8.91 m (29 ft 3 in)
- Wingspan: 10.27 m (33 ft 8 in)
- Height: 3.38 m (11 ft 1 in)
- Wing area: 16.95 m^{2} (182.4 sq ft)
- Empty weight: 726 kg (1,601 lb)
- Gross weight: 1,026 kg (2,262 lb)
- Powerplant: 1 × Walter Minor 6-III six-cylinder inline engine, 118 kW (160 hp)
- Propellers: 2-bladed

Performance

- Maximum speed: 227 km/h (141 mph, 123 kn)
- Range: 880 km (550 mi, 480 nmi)
- Service ceiling: 4,650 m (15,260 ft)
