= Dimitrije Konjović =

Serbian naval officer

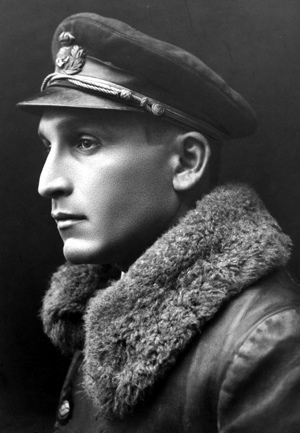
- Dimitrije Konjović (c. 1940)
- Born: 31 December 1888; Stanišić, Vojvodina, Austro-Hungarian Empire
- Died: 21 April 1982 (aged 89) Belgrade, Yugoslavia
- Allegiance: Austria-Hungary
- Branch: Austro-Hungarian Army; Austro-Hungarian Navy
- Service years: 1909–1918
- Rank: Frigate captain
- Conflicts: First World War; Adriatic campaign

Dimitrije Konjović (German: Demeter Konjovics; 31 December 1888 – 5 January 1982) was a Serbian naval officer, aviator and entrepreneur of the Austro-Hungarian Marine Air Force and later Yugoslav Air Force. In 1923 he founded the Ikarus Aircraft Factory in Zemun, in present-day Serbia.

Dimitrije Konjović is the younger brother of the composer Petar Konjović and the cousin of the painter Milan Konjović.

== Biography ==
=== Youth ===
Konjovic was born in Stanišić near the town of Sombor, Vojvodina, a region which was then part of Austro-Hungarian Empire. After completing the elementary school in Stanišić, near Sombor, he studied the Hungarian High School in Sombor and then, with the help of his parish, he studied at the Imperial and Royal Naval Academy in Fiume. After four years of studies he sailed in the Mediterranean and on the oceans serving as an Austro-Hungarian Navy navigation officer. He got acquainted with aviation in 1911 and 1912 during his service in Pola, where he flew a seaplane built by engineer Josif Mikla.

=== World War I ===
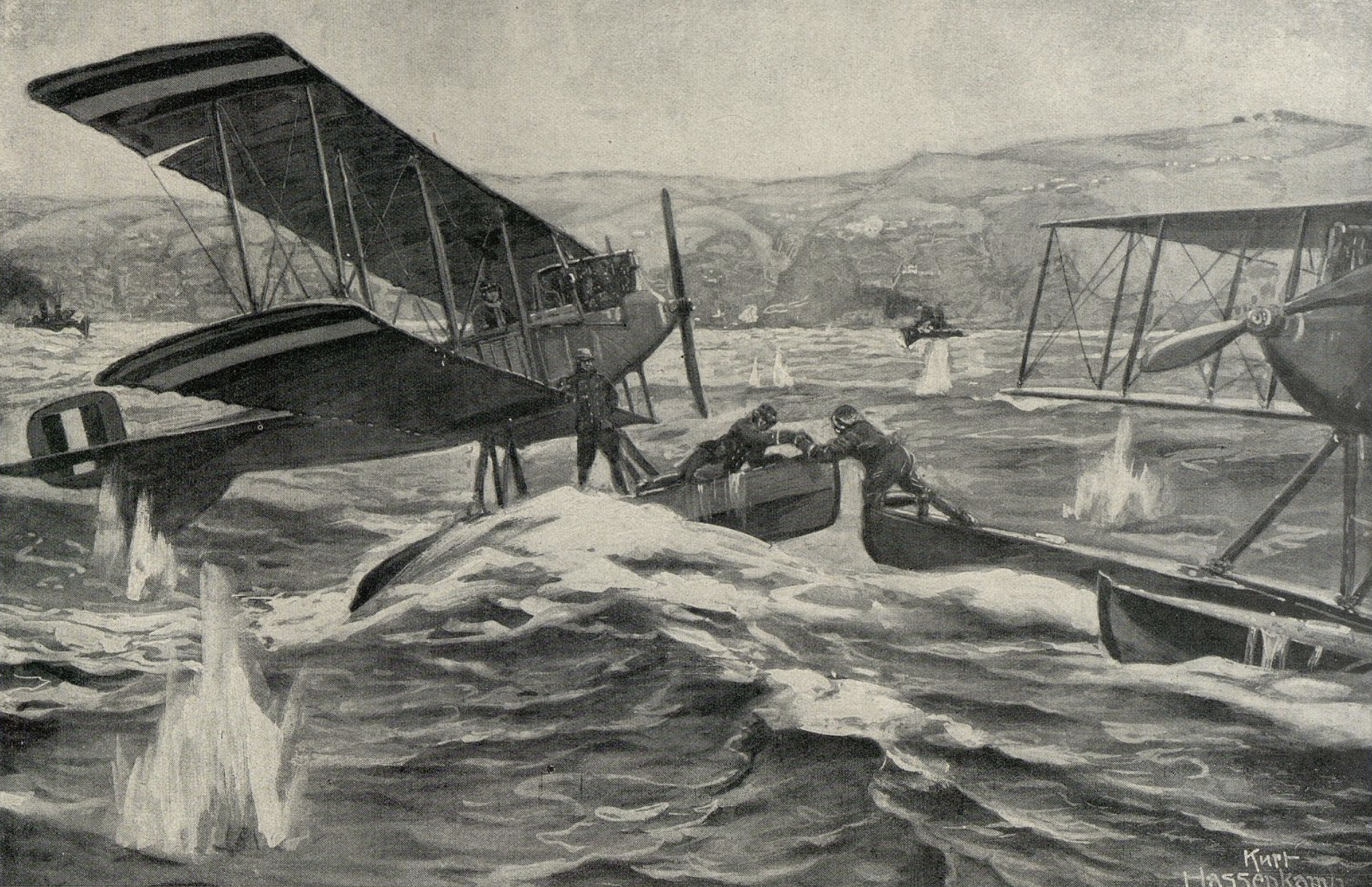
Lieutenant Konjović saves the officers of a damaged k.k. plane under fire of enemy batteries in the Adriatic Sea, February 2 1916 (German illustration)

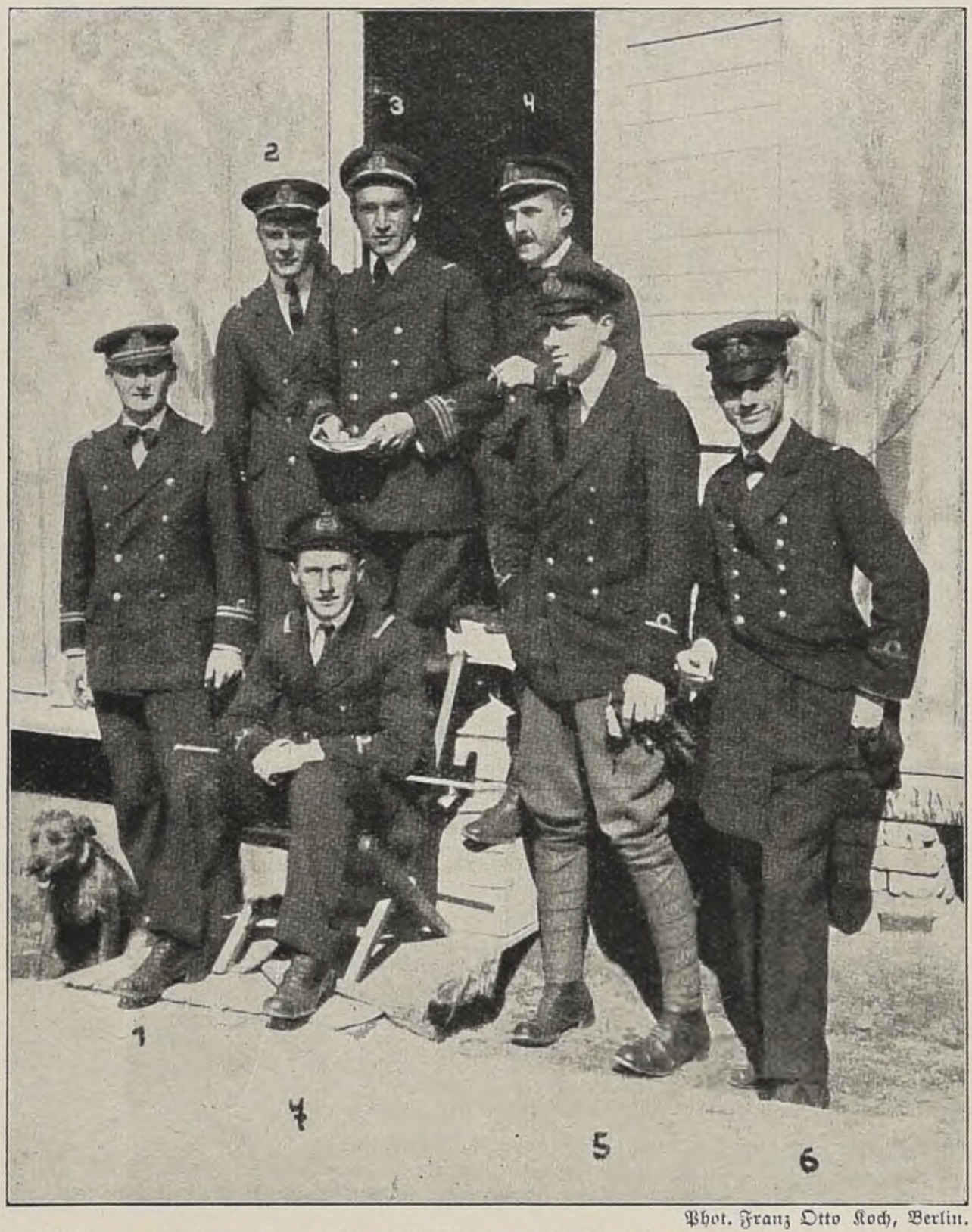
The aviation officers of the k.u.k. Flotten-Flugabteilung with its commander, Lieutenant Konjović (3.) 1. Freglt. Klimburg, 2. Freglt. Kunsti 4. Freglt. Ritschel, 5. Seektl. Fritsch von Cronenwald, 6. Seekdt. Schmidt, 7. Seekdt. Severra

At the outbreak of World War I he served as an officer and commander of a naval squadron. At the end of 1914, at his request, he underwent a year-long pilot training until the end of 1915, he when he start to participate on a air patrols in the northern Adriatic Sea. He was then appointed commander of all seaplane bases from Šibenik to the Albanian border with the command base located at Kumbor. In the Bay of Kotor and he remained placed until the end of the war.

On September 15 1915, Lieutenant-Commander Konjović and Officer Valter Železny, flying the UFAG TL L132 (Konjović) and Ufag TL L135 (Železny) seaplanes, surprised a French submarine Foucault (Q70), bombed it and sank it; the survivors were rescued. This was the first time that an aircraft had sunk a submarine. At the end of the war Konjović reached the rank of Frigate captain.

=== Yugoslavia ===
After the armistice in 1918 Konjović handed over the Austro-Hungarian marine air fleet under the command of the Kingdom of Serbs, Croats and Slovenes and later was appointed the first head of the Naval Aviation of the new country, remaining in this position until 1923. On 2 October 1923, he founded the Ikarus aircraft company, one of the first aircraft manufacturers in the Balkans, and then served as its director and one of the main shareholders for twenty years.

During World War II, when the Axis powers occupied Yugoslavia, Konjović was arrested and imprisoned in the Banjica concentration camp near Belgrade for a few years. After his release, he spent the rest of the war living on a farm near the capital. After the 1945 liberation of Yugoslavia he reorganized his factory in Zemun and once again worked there as the director. However, in 1946 he was accused by the communist authorities of "economic collaboration with the occupiers". His assets were confiscated, including his shares in the Ikarus company.

In 1947, Konjović retired from the public life and moved with his family to Beška, where he worked in agriculture. Family returned to Belgrade in 1961. Dimitrije Konjović lived there until his death in 1982.

== See also ==
- Ikarus Aircraft Factory

== Bibliography ==
- Grey, C.G., ed. (1934). Jane's all the World's Aircraft 1934. London: Sampson Low, Marston & company, ltd. p. 310c.
- Mikić, Sava J. (1933). Istorija jugoslovenskog vazduhoplovstva (in Serbian). Belgrade: D. Gregorić.
