= List of defunct airlines of Serbia =

This is a list of defunct airlines of Serbia.

Airline	Image	IATA	ICAO	Callsign	Commenced operations	Ceased operations	Notes
Aeroput					1927	1948	Taken over by the government and rebranded as JAT Yugoslav Airlines
Air Tomisko			TOH	TOMISKO CARGO	2006	2007	
Air Vega					2012		
Air Yugoslavia		JR	YRG	YUGAIR	1969	2005	Charter subsidiary of Jat Airways
Airpink		PNK		AIR PINK	2004	2024	
Aviogenex		JJ	AGX	GENEX	1968	2015	
Aviolet		JU	ASL		2014	2021	Division of Air Serbia
Centavia		7N	CNA		2006	2006	
Intair Link		JU	JAT		2003	2004	Merged into Jat Airways
Jat Airways		JU	JAT		2003	2013	Rebranded as Air Serbia
Jat Airways AVIO taxi		JU	JAT	JAT	2002		
JAT Yugoslav Airlines		JU	JAT		1947	2003	Rebranded as Jat Airways
Kosmas Air			KMG		2003	2008	
Master Airways		FZ	MSW		2006	2006	A Montenegro airline registered in Serbia
United International Airlines			UIL	UNITED LINER	2007	2008	

== See also ==
- List of airlines of Serbia
- List of airports in Serbia
- List of airlines of Yugoslavia
