= Jat Airways AVIO Taxi =

Air taxi company in Serbia

IATA	ICAO	Call sign
JU	JAT	JAT
- Founded: 2002; 24 years ago
- Ceased operations: 2013; 13 years ago
- Hubs: Belgrade Nikola Tesla Airport; Vršac Airport
- Fleet size: 21
- Parent company: Jat Airways
- Headquarters: Vršac, Serbia
- Key people: Srđan Radovanović (CEO)

Jat Airways AVIO Taxi (Serbian: Јат ервејз АВИО такси) / Jat ervejz AVIO taksi) was a taxi airline company in Serbia with bases at Belgrade Nikola Tesla Airport and Vršac Airport. It was one of the three air taxi companies, along with Prince Aviation and Air Pink. Jat Airways AVIO Taxi was a subsidiary of the national air carrier of Serbia, Jat Airways.

== History ==
The Jat Airways AVIO Taxi Company was formed in 2002. It transported passengers from Belgrade and Vršac to European destinations, and a few destinations in North Africa.

In 2004, the airline started operating scenic tours for tourists flying around Belgrade city center.

== Fleet ==
The Jat Airways AVIO taxi fleet consisted of the following:

- 15 Cessna 172
- 2 Cessna 152 Aerobat
- 2 Cessna 310T
- 2 Piper PA-31T Cheyenne

When the aircraft were not being hired for air taxi service they were often used for training by young pilots.

== See also ==
- Jat Airways
