= 7N =

7N or 7N may refer to:

- 7N or 7°N, the 7th parallel north latitude
- Canon EOS Elan 7N, a 2004 35 mm film single-lens reflex camera
- Centavia, IATA airline designator
- Nitrogen (_{7}N), a chemical element
- Pye 7N, numbering system for recordings used by Pye Records
- Piccadilly 7N, numbering system for recordings used by Piccadilly unit of Pye Records
- 7N, the production code for the 1989 Doctor Who serial Battlefield

== See also ==
- N7 (disambiguation)
