= Vršac Airfield =

Vršac Airfield Аеродром Вршац
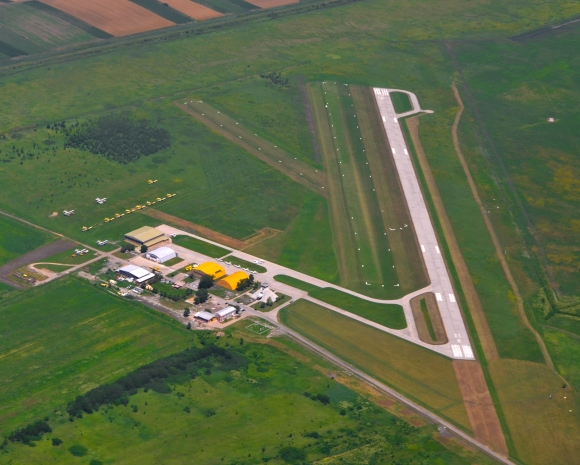
- IATA: none; ICAO: LYVR

Summary
- Airport type: Public
- Owner: Government of Serbia
- Operator: Aviation Academy
- Serves: Vršac
- Location: Vršac, Serbia
- Elevation AMSL: 276 ft / 84 m
- Coordinates: 45°08′52″N 21°18′35″E
- Website: www.vakademija.edu.rs

Map
- Location within Serbia

Runways
Direction	Length		Surface
Direction	ft	m	Surface
01R/19L	3,280	1,000	Asphalt
01L/19R	2,952	815	Grass
16/34	1,969	515	Grass

Vršac Airfield (Serbian: Аеродром Вршац / Aerodrom Vršac) (ICAO: LYVR) is a small aerodrome and training facility owned and operated by the SMATSA Aviation Academy, and located in Vršac, Serbia.

There are five hangars at the airfield, which accommodate aircraft of the flight school and of the agricultural aviation division. An office building with classrooms and a control tower are adjacent to the hangars and the concrete aircraft apron.

== History ==
The first flight on the slopes of Vršac Mountains was performed by the Romanian pilot-engineer Aurel Vlaicu on 11 August 1912. The starting year of aeronautical tradition was 1925, when aeronautical club "Naša krila" (English: "Our Wings") was founded. A study was made about the advantages of this region for development of gliding sport, and this had initiated the investors to build the first hangar in 1934.

After World War II, the intensive training of glider pilots continued. In 1954, Vršac becomes official State Aeronautical Centre. Glider pilots were now joined by parachutists, aeroplane pilots and aircraft-model makers. Vršac was the recruitment centre for recreational aeronautics until 1972. Fliers from this centre took place in many world championships and brought many medals and records. In 1972, Vršac hosted the 13th World Gliding Championships (WGC).

In 1972, the national airline of Yugoslavia, JAT Yugoslav Airlines, now known as Air Serbia, started training future airline pilots at the academy they opened at Vršac. The Jat Airways Flight Academy each year organizes the "Vršac Airshow".

The first international flight from Vršac was to Podgorica Airport in Montenegro on February 5, 2007. The aerodrome received international airport status in 2006.

== Services ==
=== SMATSA Aviation Academy ===
Vršac Airfield is home to the SMATSA Aviation Academy, formerly known as the Jat Airways Flight Academy.

In October 2005, the Maintenance Department of the SMATSA Aviation Academy received certification of conforming to European Union (JAA) standards in the maintenance of light aircraft - EASA part 145. This certification opens the possibility of maintaining aircraft for clients throughout Europe.

Vršac Airfield has trained many pilots from different airports over the years. In 2007, the airport will be the training base for future pilots from India and China. Vršac has also trained pilots from Air Algérie, Air Mali, Air Malta, Iraqi Airways, Libyan Arab Airlines, TAAG Angola Airlines and Turkish Airlines.

=== Maintenance Centre ===
Light Aircraft Maintenance Centre in Vršac at SMATSA Aviation Academy holds an EASA 145 Certificate, as required for maintaining and repairing smaller planes from the European Union. Aircraft from the fleet of the Greek business air carrier GAA, whose pilots have recently renewed their flying licenses in the institution, are also maintained in Vršac.

== See also ==
- List of airports in Serbia
- Transport in Serbia
