= Air Pink =

Airline of Serbia

IATA	ICAO	Call sign
-	PNK	AIR PINK
- Founded: October 2004
- Ceased operations: February 2024
- Hubs: Belgrade Nikola Tesla Airport
- Fleet size: 19
- Destinations: VIP and taxi airline
- Headquarters: Belgrade, Serbia
- Key people: Željko Mitrović, Aleksandar Ilić
- Website: airpink.com

Air Pink (stylised as airpink; Serbian: Ер Пинк / Er Pink) was a private business jet charter airline based in Belgrade, Serbia. It was founded in October 2004 as part of Pink Media Group, owned by Željko Mitrović, main base was Belgrade Nikola Tesla Airport. The business has since been rebranded as ImperialJet after a majority interest was acquired by German entrepreneur Abed El Jaouni in 2024.

== Destinations ==
Air Pink provided executive/VIP air charter and corporate jet services to destinations in Europe, Middle East and North Africa.

== Fleet ==
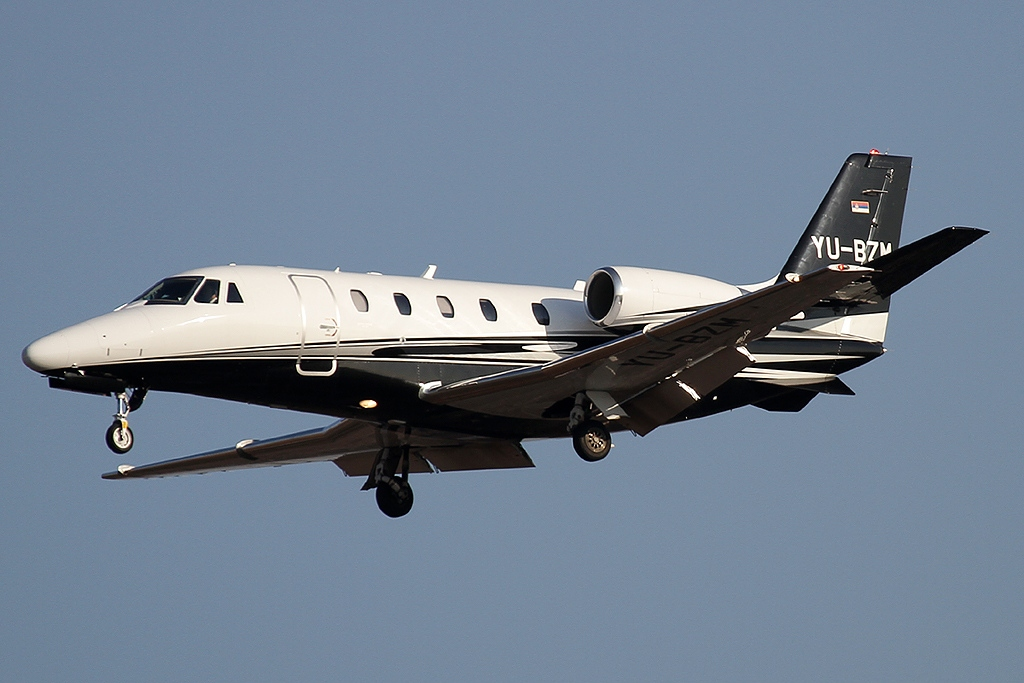
Air Pink Cessna Citation 560XL XLS+, 2013

Total	Type	Passengers
2	Embraer Legacy 600	8–13
1	Cessna Citation 560XL XLS	8
8	Cessna Citation 560XL XLS+	7
2	Cessna Citation 550 Bravo	7
5	Cessna Citation CJ	5
1	Cessna Citation 525B CJ3	7

== See also ==
- List of airlines in Serbia
