= List of airlines of Serbia =

This is a list of airlines currently operating in Serbia.

== Scheduled airlines ==
Airline	Image	ICAO	IATA	Callsign	Commenced operations	Hub airport(s)	Notes
Air Serbia		ASL	JU	AIR SERBIA	2013	Belgrade Nikola Tesla Airport	

== Charter airlines ==
Airline	Image	ICAO	IATA	Callsign	Commenced operations	Hub airport(s)	Notes
Avio Sluzba Vlade						Belgrade Nikola Tesla Airport	Government Airline
Balkan Helicopters						Belgrade Nikola Tesla Airport	Heli operations
MPC Air						Belgrade Nikola Tesla Airport	
Prince Aviation		PNC		PRINCE AVIATION	1992	Belgrade Nikola Tesla Airport	
Star Fly Wings						Belgrade Nikola Tesla Airport	

== See also ==
- List of defunct airlines of Serbia
- List of airlines of Yugoslavia
