= Serbia and Montenegro Air Traffic Services Agency =

Serbian air traffic control service company

SMATSA
- Official logo
- Native name: СМАТСА
- Type: d.o.o.
- Industry: Aerospace
- Founded: 31 October 2003; 22 years ago
- Headquarters: Trg Nikole Pašića 10, Belgrade, Serbia
- Key people: Predrag Jovanović (Director)
- Revenue: ▼€81.77 million (2018)
- Net income: ▼€0.27 million (2018)
- Total assets: ▲€152.93 million (2018)
- Total equity: ▲€119.71 million (2018)
- Owner: Government of Serbia (92%); Government of Montenegro (8%)
- Number of employees: 918 (2018)
- Website: www.smatsa.rs
- Footnotes; Business ID: 17520407; Tax ID: 103170161

SMATSA or the Serbia and Montenegro Air Traffic Services Agency, is a Serbian air traffic control service company based in Belgrade, Serbia. It covers the air traffic in Serbia, Montenegro and about 55% of Bosnia and Herzegovina, until 5 December 2019 when air traffic control was transferred to Bosnia and Herzegovina Air Navigation Services Agency (BHANSA).

== History ==
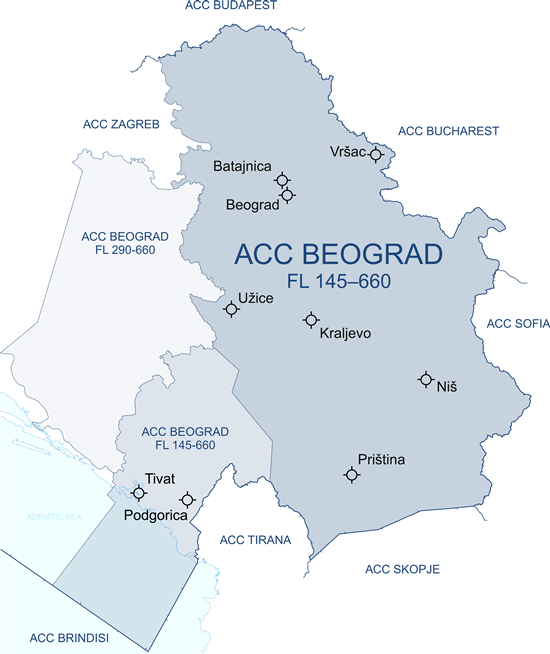
SMATSA area of responsibility

SMATSA was established on 31 October 2003. A new air traffic control facility was opened in 2010 near Belgrade Nikola Tesla Airport and covers about 9,000 m^{2}, with an investment of around 1.08 billion Serbian dinars.

By these acts, the Flight Control of Serbia and Montenegro (SMATSA doo) continued to operate in accordance with national and international regulations, according to the international agreements signed until then. It soon became a member of the world's most important international aviation organizations. This achieved the integration of SMATSA into the European air traffic management system as one of the members of EUROCONTROL.
