= N7 =

N7 may refer to:

== Music and entertainment ==
- N7, 1995 film with Cliff Parisi
- Never 7: The End of Infinity, a Japanese video game

== Transport ==
- London Buses route N7
- National Airlines (N7), an airline that operated from 1999 to 2002 under the IATA N7
- LNER Class N7, a class of British steam locomotives
- Xiali N7, a Chinese SUV
- Denza N7, an electric SUV by BYD Auto
- Luxgen n7, an electric SUV
- Nissan N7, an electric sedan

== Roads ==
- N7 road (Bangladesh)
- N7 road (Belgium), a road connecting Brussels and Doornik passing Halle and Ath
- N7 road (France)
- N7 road (Ireland)
- N7 road (Luxembourg)
- N7 road (Netherlands), part of Rijksweg 7
- N7 road (Senegal)
- N7 road (South Africa), a road in South Africa connecting Cape Town to the Namibian border
- N7 road (Switzerland)
- Nebraska Highway 7, a state highway in the U.S. state of Nebraska

== N07 or N°7 ==
- ATC code N07 Other nervous system drugs, a subgroup of the Anatomical Therapeutic Chemical Classification System
- Lincoln Park Airport, New Jersey, USA (FAA location ID: N07)
- N°7, a shortening for Number Seven
- 7 (Nancy Ajram album), or N°7, an album by Nancy Ajram

== Other ==
- N7, a postcode district in the N postcode area of London, England
- USS N-7 (SS-59), a 1917 N-class coastal defense submarine of the United States Navy
- N7 Day, an informal commemorative day observed annually on November 7 to celebrate the Mass Effect media franchise
- Nexus 7 (2012 version) or Nexus 7 (2013 version), Android tablets from Google
- ENSEEIHT, a French engineering school, nicknamed N7 after the phonetically equivalent French pronunciation of the acronym
- N7, abbreviation for the 7 nanometer semiconductor technology process node
- n−7 or omega−7 fatty acid

== See also ==
- 7N (disambiguation)
