= Aviolet =

Regional airline of Serbia (2014–2021)

IATA	ICAO	Call sign
JU	JAT	AIR SERBIA
- Founded: 24 May 2014
- Ceased operations: 2021 (re-integrated into Air Serbia)
- Hubs: Belgrade Nikola Tesla Airport
- Frequent-flyer program: Etihad Guest
- Fleet size: flights operated by Air Serbia planes
- Destinations: 26
- Parent company: Air Serbia
- Headquarters: Belgrade, Serbia

Aviolet (Serbian Cyrillic: Авиолет) was a Serbian regional airline headquartered in Belgrade. It was a fully owned subsidiary of Air Serbia and mostly operated international charter flights from Serbia. As of 2021, Aviolet ceased to exist, with Air Serbia taking over its charter operation.

== History ==
The airline was founded on 24 May 2014 as a subsidiary of Air Serbia. Most flights departed from Belgrade's Nikola Tesla Airport, and were carried out by aircraft and crews of Air Serbia.

== Destinations ==
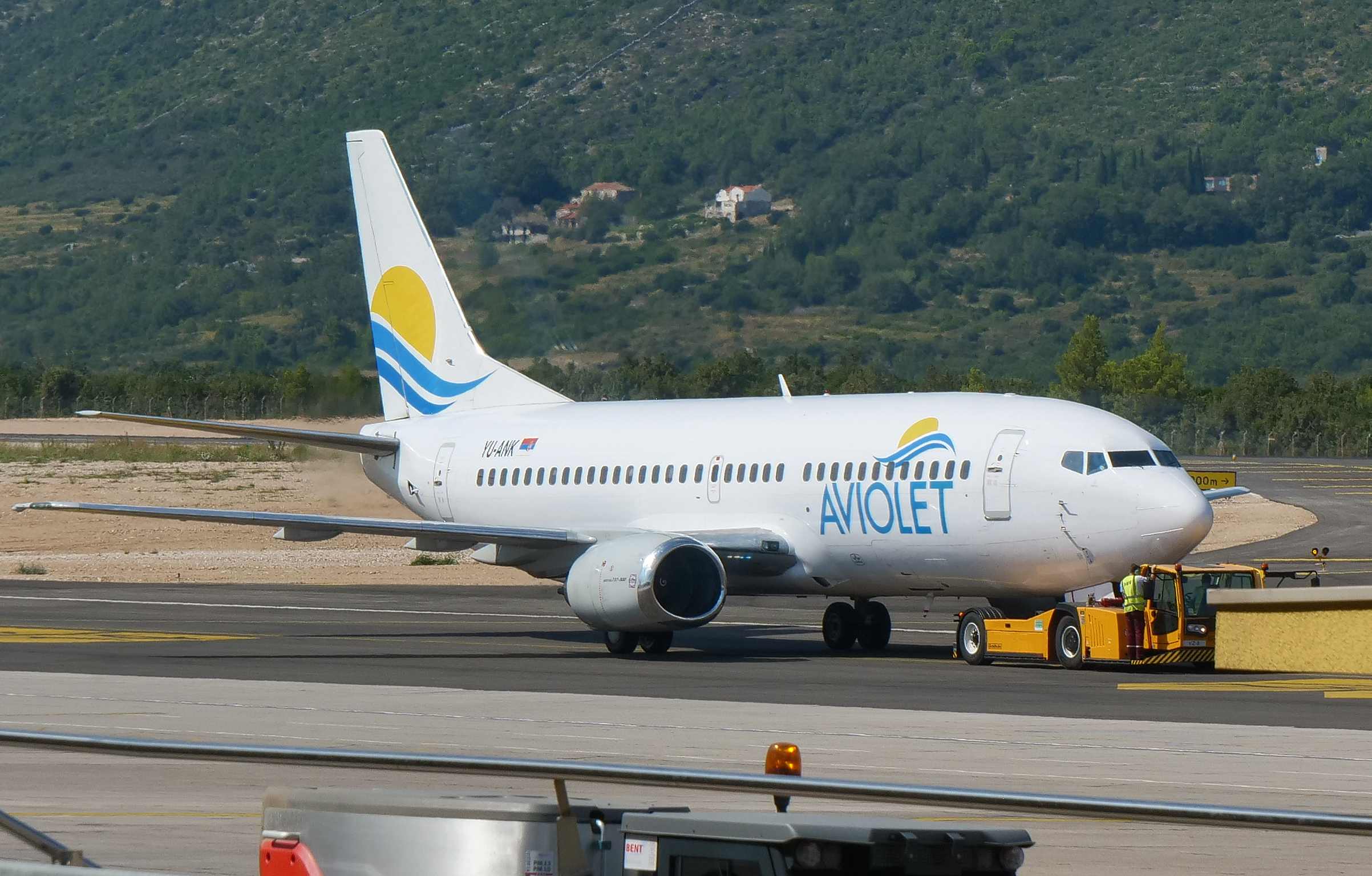
Aviolet Boeing 737-300 at Dubrovnik Airport in Croatia

As of 2019, Aviolet served 26 destinations (all seasonal charter flights):

Country	City	Airport	Notes	Ref
Bosnia and Herzegovina	Banja Luka	Banja Luka International Airport	Focus city	
Egypt	Hurghada	Hurghada International Airport	Seasonal charter	
Egypt	Sharm El Sheikh	Sharm El Sheikh International Airport	Seasonal charter	
Greece	Athens	Athens International Airport	Seasonal charter	
Greece	Chania	Chania International Airport	Seasonal charter	
Greece	Corfu	Corfu International Airport	Seasonal charter	
Greece	Heraklion	Heraklion International Airport	Seasonal charter	
Greece	Karpathos	Karpathos Island National Airport	Seasonal charter	
Greece	Cephalonia	Kephalonia International Airport	Seasonal charter	
Greece	Kos	Kos International Airport	Seasonal charter	
Greece	Preveza	Preveza Airport	Seasonal charter	
Greece	Rhodes	Rhodes International Airport	Seasonal charter	
Greece	Samos	Samos International Airport	Seasonal charter	
Greece	Santorini	Santorini International Airport	Seasonal charter	
Greece	Skiathos	Skiathos International Airport	Seasonal charter	
Greece	Zakynthos	Zakynthos International Airport	Seasonal charter	
Italy	Alghero	Alghero–Fertilia Airport	Seasonal charter	
Italy	Catania	Catania–Fontanarossa Airport	Seasonal charter	
Italy	Lamezia Terme	Lamezia Terme International Airport	Seasonal charter	
Italy	Palermo	Palermo Airport	Seasonal charter	
Serbia	Belgrade	Belgrade Nikola Tesla Airport	hub	
Spain	Palma de Mallorca	Palma de Mallorca Airport	Seasonal charter	
Tunisia	Enfidha	Enfidha–Hammamet International Airport	Seasonal charter	
Turkey	Antalya	Antalya Airport	Seasonal charter	
Turkey	Dalaman	Dalaman Airport	Seasonal charter	
Turkey	Bodrum	Milas–Bodrum Airport	Seasonal charter	

=== Codeshare agreements ===
Aviolet additionally maintains codeshare agreements with parent company Air Serbia.

== Fleet ==
=== Former fleet ===
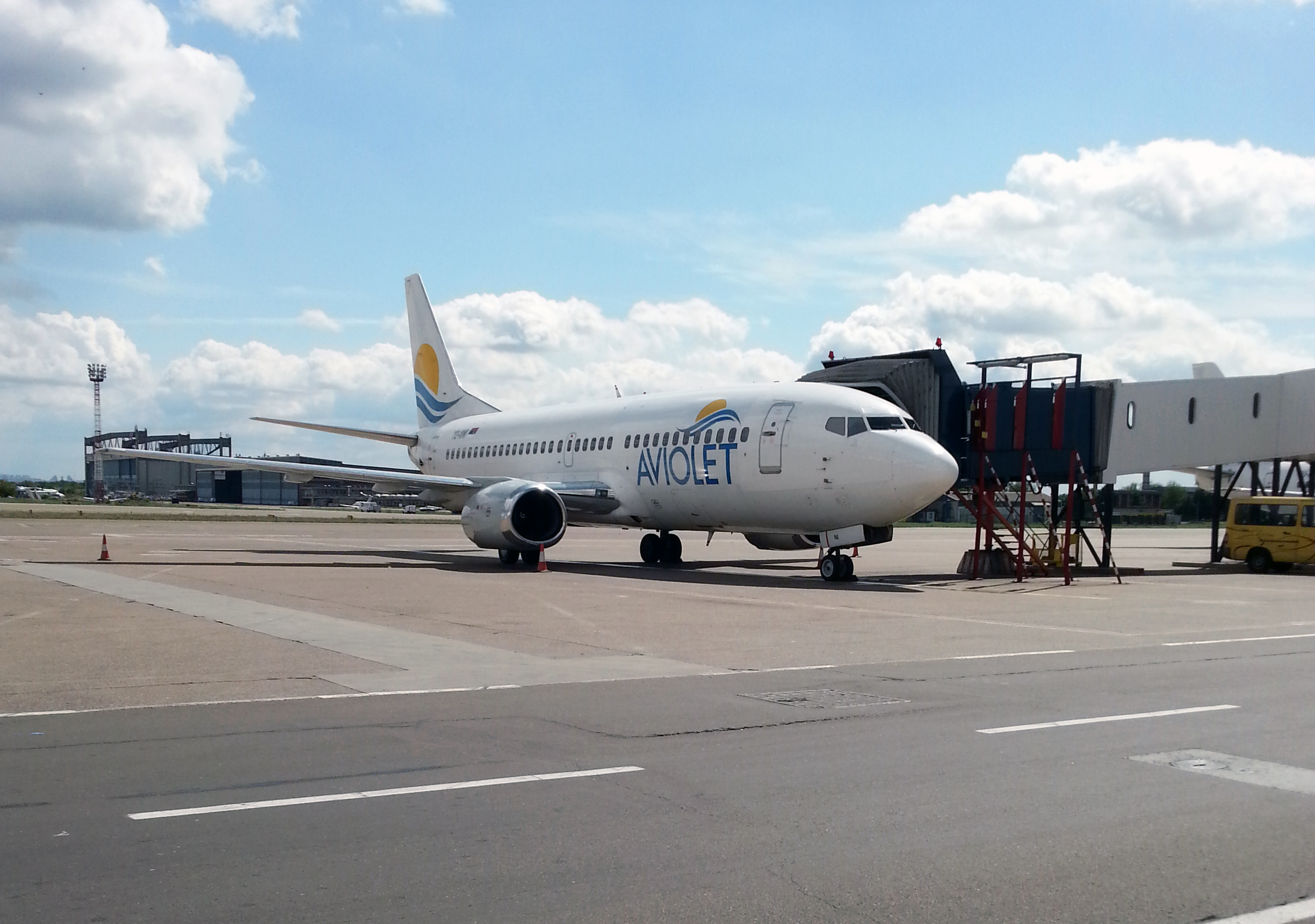
Aviolet Boeing 737-300

As of 2019, Aviolet was operating Airbus A320 family aircraft of Air Serbia:

Former Aviolet fleet
Aircraft	number of aircraft	in service	Passengers	Notes
Boeing 737-300	4	2014-2021	144	YU-AND, YU-ANI, YU-ANJ, YU-ANK
