= Prince Aviation =

Serbian airline

IATA	ICAO	Call sign
–	PNC	PRINCE
- Founded: 1990 (as Prince Air)
- Hubs: Belgrade Nikola Tesla Airport
- Fleet size: 11
- Headquarters: Belgrade, Serbia
- Key people: Ðorđe Jovanović (President); Slobodan Stričević (CEO)
- Website: www.princeaviation.com

Prince Aviation (stylised in all lowercase) is a private charter operator and air taxi in Serbia. It was founded in 1990, and its hub is the Belgrade Nikola Tesla Airport in Belgrade. It is best known as the first VIP airline in the Balkans. Besides operating air taxi services, the company has a well-renowned flight school and a Part 145 maintenance center, primarily servicing its own aircraft.

== History ==
Prince Aviation was founded in 1989 as Prince Air. It is the oldest private airline in Serbia. It made its first commercial flight in 1991. On New Year's Eve of 1993, Prince Air made its first flight from Belgrade Nikola Tesla International Airport using its first airplane, a Cessna 421.

== Destinations ==
Prince Aviation can fly to any destination within Europe, and select destinations in Northern Africa and Asia upon request.

== Fleet ==
Air taxi

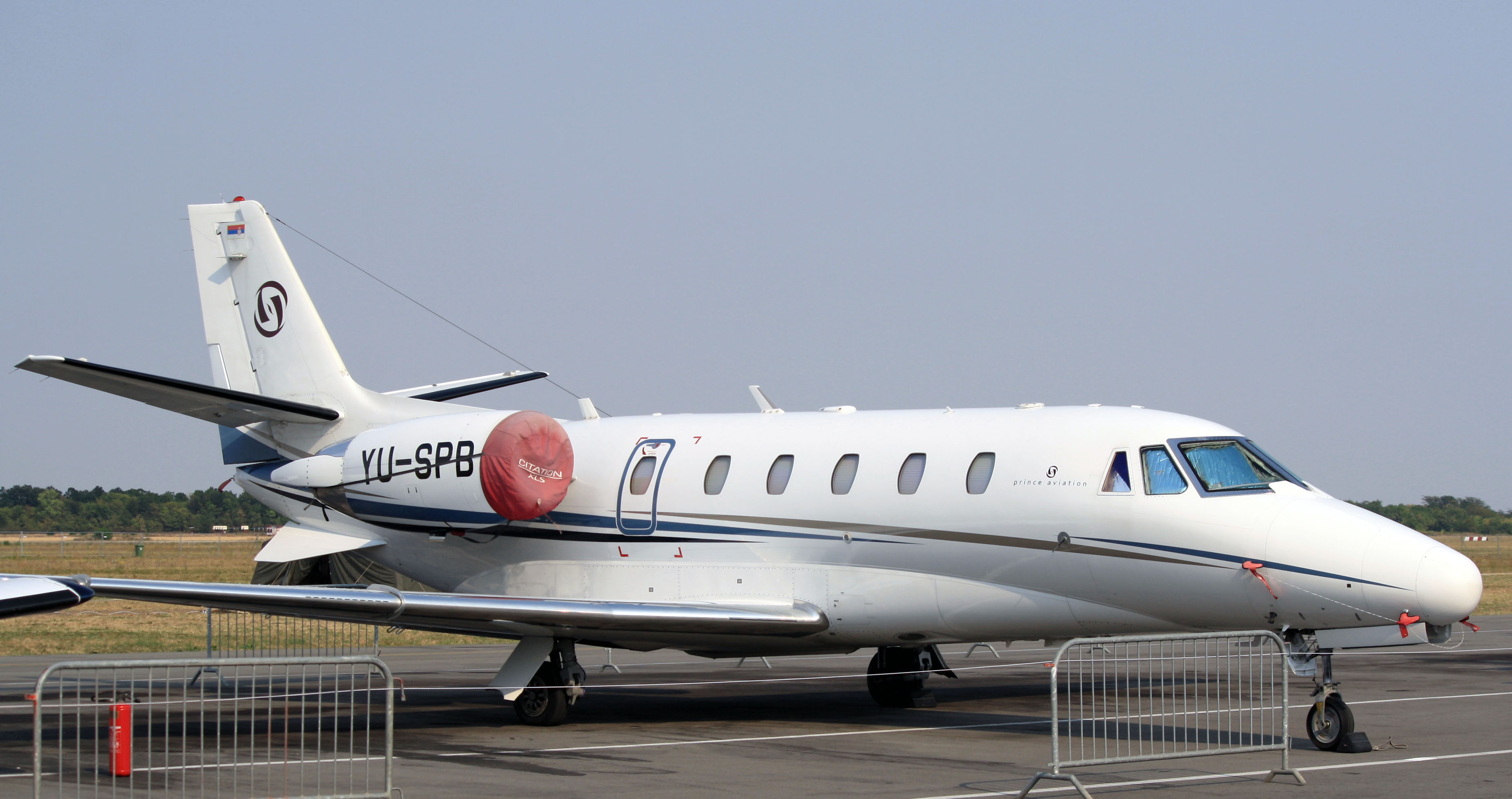
Prince Aviation Cessna 560 Citation XLS on display at Batajnica Air Base in 2012

Aircraft	In service	Orders	Notes
Cessna 560XL Citation XLS	4	0	
Dassault Falcon 2000LXS	1	0	
	5	0	

Flight academy

Aircraft	In service	Orders	Notes
Cessna 172N/R	4	0	
Piper PA-44 Seminole	1	0	
	5	0	

Former fleet

- 1 Cessna 421 Golden Eagle (nickname: Old Betsy)
- 1 Cessna 500 Citation I
- 1 Cessna 550 Citation II
- 1 Piper PA34-200T Seneca II

== Incidents and accidents ==
- On 15 July 2010, a Prince Aviation Cessna 550 Citation II YU-BSG overrun the runway while landing at Bol Airport. Investigation concluded that the incident occurred because the approach was too fast and too steep. The aircraft overshot touchdown zone, couldn't stop by the end of the runway, penetrated the aerodrome fence and end up in stone area. As result of contact with rocks, aircraft's right leg collapsed, and right wing caught fire. The three crew members and two passengers escaped serious injury. The aircraft was damaged beyond repair.

== See also ==
- List of airlines in Serbia
