= Centavia =

Serbian airline

Centavia Central European Aviation
IATA	ICAO	Call sign
7N	CNA	N/A
- Founded: 2005
- Ceased operations: 2006
- Hubs: Belgrade Nikola Tesla Airport
- Fleet size: Defunct
- Destinations: Defunct
- Headquarters: Belgrade, Serbia
- Key people: Predrag Vujović, founder
- Website: N/A

Centavia (Central European Aviation) was a short-lived Serbian low-cost airline. Its hub airport was Belgrade Nikola Tesla Airport in Serbia while its technical base was in Cologne Bonn Airport in Germany. The airline declared bankruptcy on 8 November 2006.

== History ==
Centavia was established in 2005 and received its first aircraft, a BAe 146-200, on 15 June 2006 from Meridiana. Its founder and CEO, Predrag Vujović, had previously attempted to set up an airline company called Air Maxi, but those plans had been abandoned due to a lack of funding.

Centavia's first (charter) flight took place on 8 July 2006, to Belgrade from Corfu. For the initial period, only charter flights were operated. The airline's second aircraft arrived on 17 August 2006 and was registered as YU-AGM.

Centavia was to be the first airline to operate flights from Belgrade to Zagreb since the dissolution of Yugoslavia. However, the Croatian Authorities rejected the airline's application, saying that no bilateral agreements existed between the two states and that the European Open Skies Agreement, ratified by Croatia, would not be applicable in this case. Similarly, the Montenegrin government denied the airline landing rights due to Serbian withdrawal of the AOC of Montenegro Airlines' daughter company, Master Airways, rejection dramatically deteriorated the economic ties between the two former Yugoslav Republics. The airline's demise was seen as collateral damage of the unresolved issues and disputes between the Republics of former Yugoslavia. Only Slovenia approved Centavia's operations request without any difficulties. Centavia was to code share on the Belgrade to Ljubljana flights with Adria Airways of Slovenia.

Centavia had received permissions and landing rights from Slovenia, Germany, Italy and Switzerland and planned to start flights to these states in the winter of 2006.

Centavia also held informal talks with Wizz Air of Hungary to jointly operate certain flights.

Centavia's two leased aircraft were returned to the lessor, BAE Systems, on 9 November 2006.

== Fleet ==
- BAe 146 (2)
