= JUSTA =

IATA	ICAO	Call sign
—	—	JUSTA
- Founded: 1947
- Commenced operations: 1947
- Ceased operations: 1949
- Hubs: Belgrade
- Headquarters: Belgrade, Serbia

JUSTA (Serbo-Croatian: Jugoslovensko-sovjetsko akcionarsko društvo za civilno vazduhoplovstvo / Југословенско-совјетско акционарско друштво за цивилно ваздухопловство, "Yugoslav-Soviet Joint Stock Company for Civil Aviation") was a joint Yugoslav-Soviet society intended for the civil air traffic. It was organized in the period of the close ideological friendship between the Yugoslavia and Soviet Union after World War II. JUSTA existed for two years, and provided domestic and international airline service. The first flights were held in summer of 1947, and after the Tito-Stalin split it ceased operations in early 1949.

It was one of the Yugoslav Soviet mixed companies created just after World War II. JUSTA used the Zemun airfield in Belgrade as a hub, and established routes linking the city with Sarajevo and Zagreb. Founded with the right to take over the most important international and domestic routes from JAT, as the agreement between Yugoslavia and the USSR entitled it to do, JUSTA also took complete control over Yugoslav civilian airports, however it operated a much smaller number of flights than the agreement originally entitled it to during 1948 as it had only four passenger and two freight airplanes and it did not have enough aircraft in its fleet to make these flights happen. While JAT flew 26,423 passengers and 89.5 metric tons of cargo during 1947, JUSTA flew only 6,294 passengers and 77 tons of freight in the same year. Conversely, the situation changed completely in 1948; JUSTA flew 14,117 passengers whilst JAT flew only 13,612, a decrease of almost 100% from the previous year and one of the worst examples of how politics often went ahead of business strategy in the former Yugoslavia. After the Tito-Stalin split, JUSTA was forced to formally cease operations on April 1. JAT benefited greatly from this event, as it now could regain its former position in the market and further expand as it got an influx of flight crews and mechanics from JUSTA further strengthening operations. Dissolution of JUSTA was announced on September 2, 1949.

JUSTA served as a Soviet intent to take over traffic control over Yugoslav airspace and confine the fledgling Yugoslav airline JAT to a few lesser domestic routes. JUSTA was operating just over a year when the Yugoslav government, because of the conflict with the USSR, made a decision to back JAT and JUSTA ended up losing in this conflict. JUSTA was liquidated in 1948.

JUSTA operated 10 Lisunov Li-2P and 2 Lisunov Li-2T aircraft, having had two accidents, one with 23 fatalities near Rumija in Montenegro, and another with no fatalities in Bari, Italy.

== Accidents and incidents ==
27 November 1947
Flight 247, a Lisunov Li-2P (YU-BAD), struck a mountain near Rumija, Montenegro in a freak snowstorm, killing all 23 on board; one report listed the death toll at 22.
