= Air Serbia =

Flag carrier of Serbia

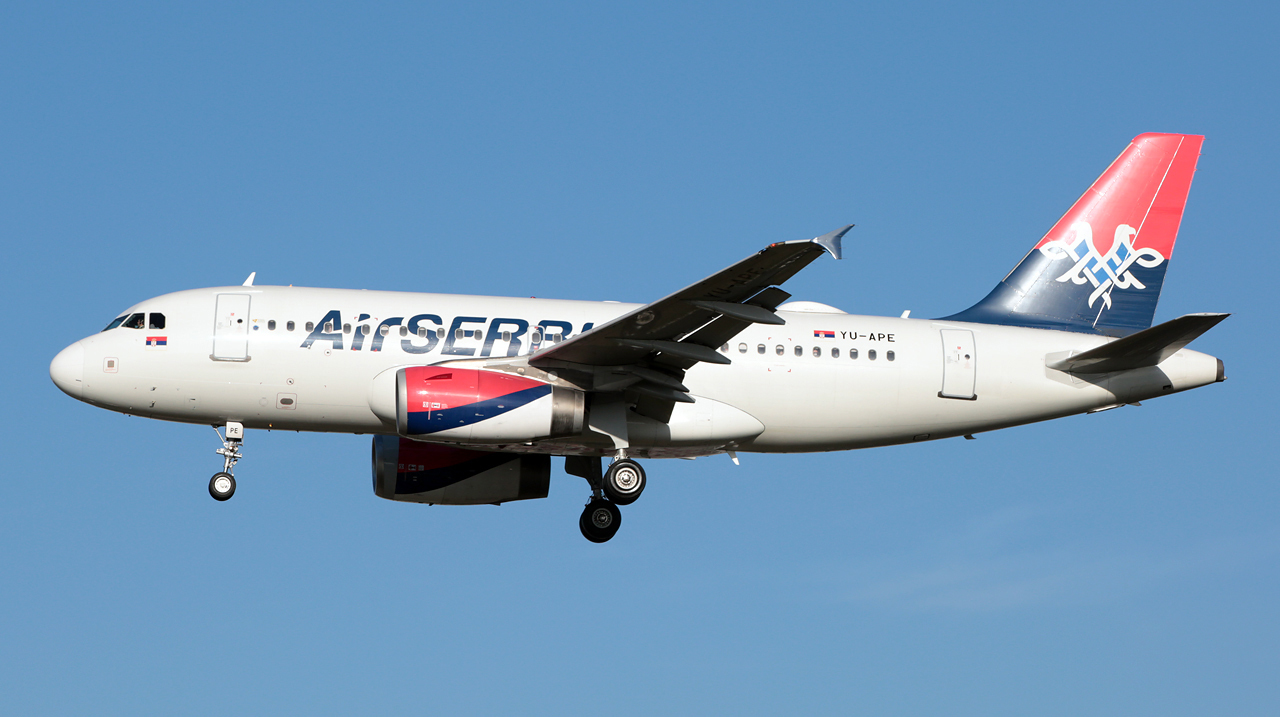
- Air Serbia Airbus A319
IATA	ICAO	Call sign
JU	ASL	AIR SERBIA
- Founded: 17 June 1927; 99 years ago (as Aeroput)
- Commenced operations: 26 October 2013; 13 years ago (preceded by Jat Airways)
- Hubs: Belgrade
- Focus cities: Niš; Kraljevo
- Frequent-flyer program: Elevate
- Subsidiaries: Air Serbia Ground Services; Air Serbia Catering; Aviolet Airlines
- Fleet size: 32
- Destinations: 103 (90)
- Parent company: Government of Serbia
- Headquarters: Belgrade, Serbia
- Key people: Jiří Marek (CEO); Dragana Čudić (CFO); Milan Kordić (COO); Branislav Malović (CGO)
- Revenue: ▲€719.5 million (2025)
- Net income: ▲€45.3 million (2025)
- Total assets: €319.22 million (2022)
- Total equity: €218.84 million (2022)
- Employees: 1,542 (2025 average)
- Website: airserbia.com

Air Serbia (stylised as AirSERBIA; Serbian: Ер Србија / Er Srbija) is the flag carrier of Serbia. The airline is headquartered in Belgrade, Serbia, and operates its main hub at Belgrade Nikola Tesla Airport. Air Serbia is the successor to Serbia's and former Yugoslavia's national airlines, including Aeroput, JAT, and Jat Airways, and operated under the name Jat Airways until it was renamed and rebranded as Air Serbia in 2013 as part of a major restructuring and modernization programme. The airline is owned by the Government of Serbia, which became the sole shareholder after previously partnering with Etihad Airways.

== History ==
=== Origins ===
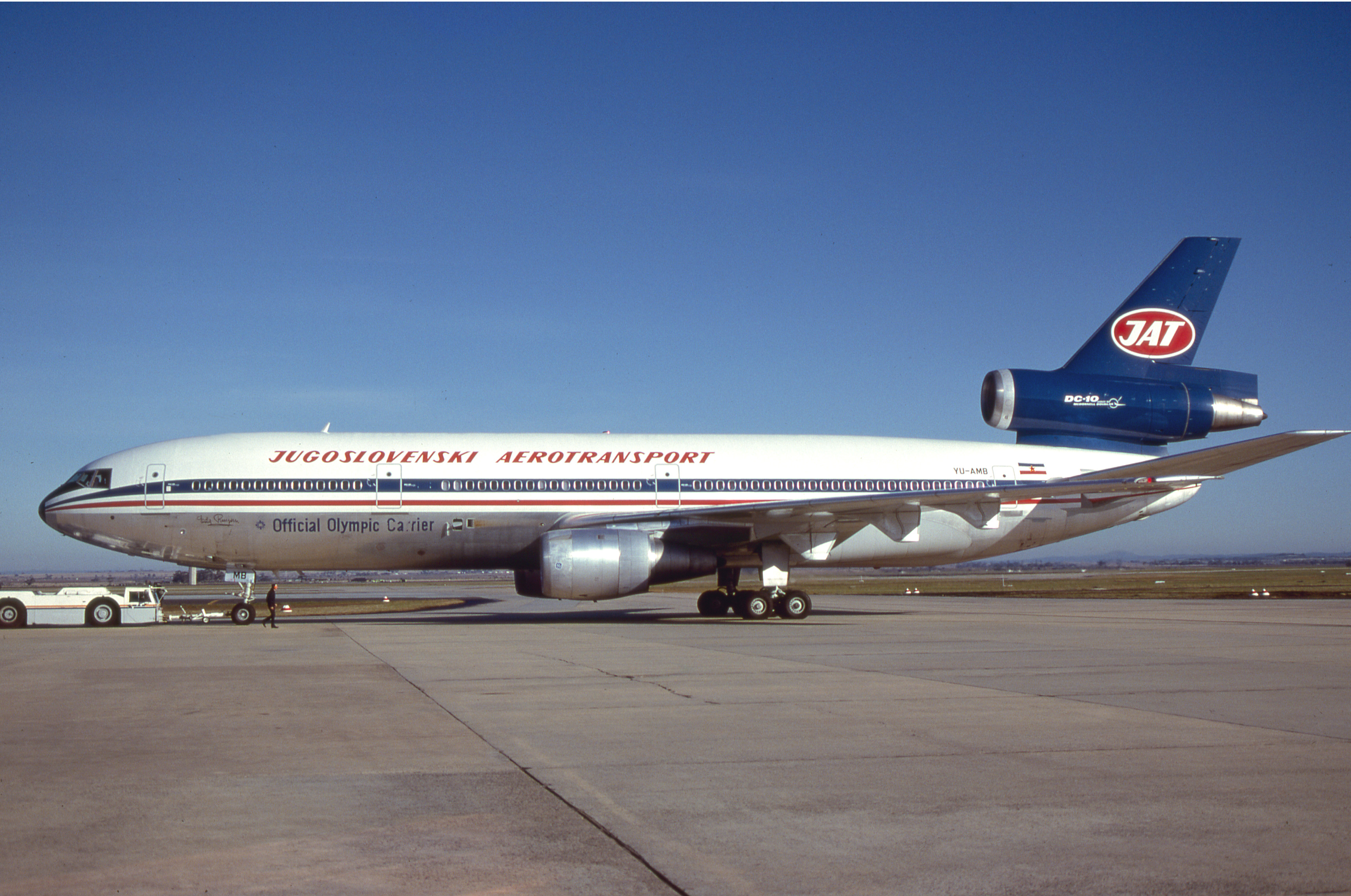
JAT DC-10 in 1984

Air Serbia originated in 1927 when the first Serbian company for civil air transport Aeroput was formed. 1927 was also the year the nation's capital Belgrade became the hub of its operations, with the inauguration of an international airport. Aeroput became the flag carrier of the Kingdom of Yugoslavia and, by the opening of numerous airfields throughout the country, significantly improved connections between the various regions. Besides providing passenger, mail, and cargo service to its domestic destinations, Aeroput inaugurated its first regular scheduled international route, Belgrade–Zagreb–Graz–Vienna, in 1929. During the 1930s, it expanded by opening new routes to other destinations in Austria, Czechoslovakia, Hungary, Romania, Bulgaria, Greece, Turkey, Albania, and Italy. These new routes helped it position itself as a major regional airliner. Its fleet consisted in one Aeroput MMS-3, one Breguet 19/10, two Caudron C.449 Goéland, one De Havilland DH.80A Puss Moth, one De Havilland DH.60M Moth, one De Havilland DH.83 Fox Moth, one De Havilland DH.89 Dragon Rapide, one Farman F.190, one Farman F.306, eight Lockheed Model 10 Electra, six Potez 29/2 and three Spartan Cruiser II, one of which was built under licence by the domestic Zmaj aircraft factory.

After WWII, the company was nationalized and rebranded as JAT Jugoslovenski Aerotransport in 1948, thus becoming the flag carrier of the FPR Yugoslavia. Despite being a communist country, Yugoslavia broke relations with the Soviet Union and became a cofounder of the Non-Aligned Movement. As a result, its fleet consisted almost entirely of Western-built aircraft. The carrier entered the jet age in 1963 with the acquisition of the Sud Aviation Caravelle, followed by the McDonnell Douglas DC-9 in 1969, the Boeing 707 in 1970, the McDonnell Douglas DC-10 in 1971, and the Boeing 727 in 1974. By the 1980s, JAT operated regular flights to all the continents except South America, which was planned for commencement by the 1990s. In 1985, JAT became the first European operator of the Boeing 737-300, and introduced the ATR 42 and ATR 72 in 1987 for its regional and domestic routes. According to IATA in 1988, JAT was the tenth largest airline in Europe by flying to 76 destinations in 39 countries, which included long-haul flights to Los Angeles, Chicago, Detroit, Cleveland, New York, Montreal, and Toronto in the west, and Beijing, Calcutta, Kuala Lumpur, Singapore, Melbourne and Sydney in the east. Its fleet modernization plan began in the 1980s with the introduction of the Boeing 737, while its long-range DC-10s were scheduled to be replaced by either the Boeing 767-400ER, the McDonnell Douglas MD-11 or the Airbus A340. However, its modernization plan was never realized due to the start of the Yugoslav wars. During the 1980s, JAT also established a maintenance hangar in Belgrade and a pilot-training academy in Belgrade and Vršac.

The continual growth of the company was disrupted by the breakup of Yugoslavia in the early 1990s. JAT became a public company on 29 February 1992 and continued its role as the flag carrier of the FR Yugoslavia.

=== Development since the 2000s ===
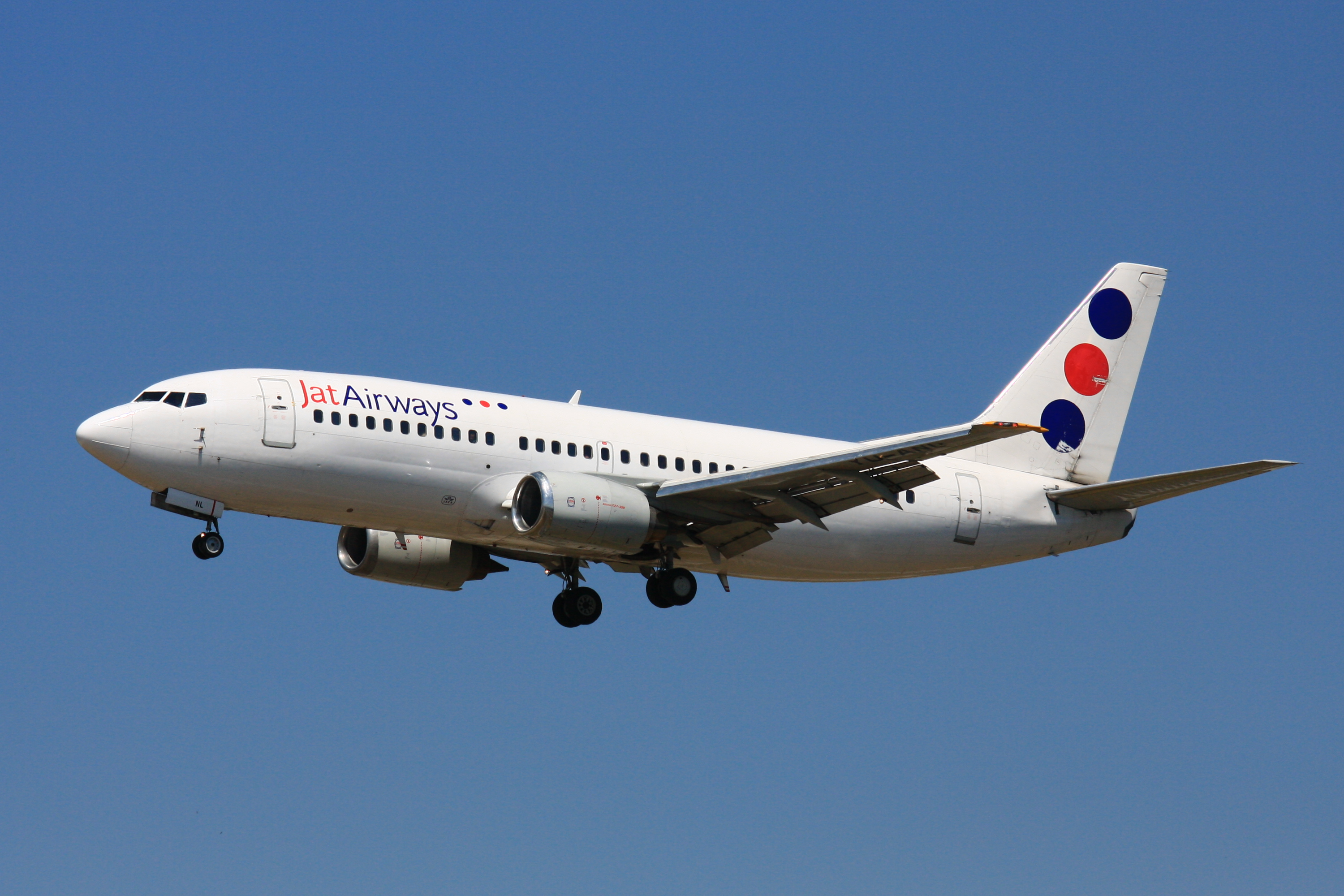
JAT Airways Boeing 737-300 in 2010

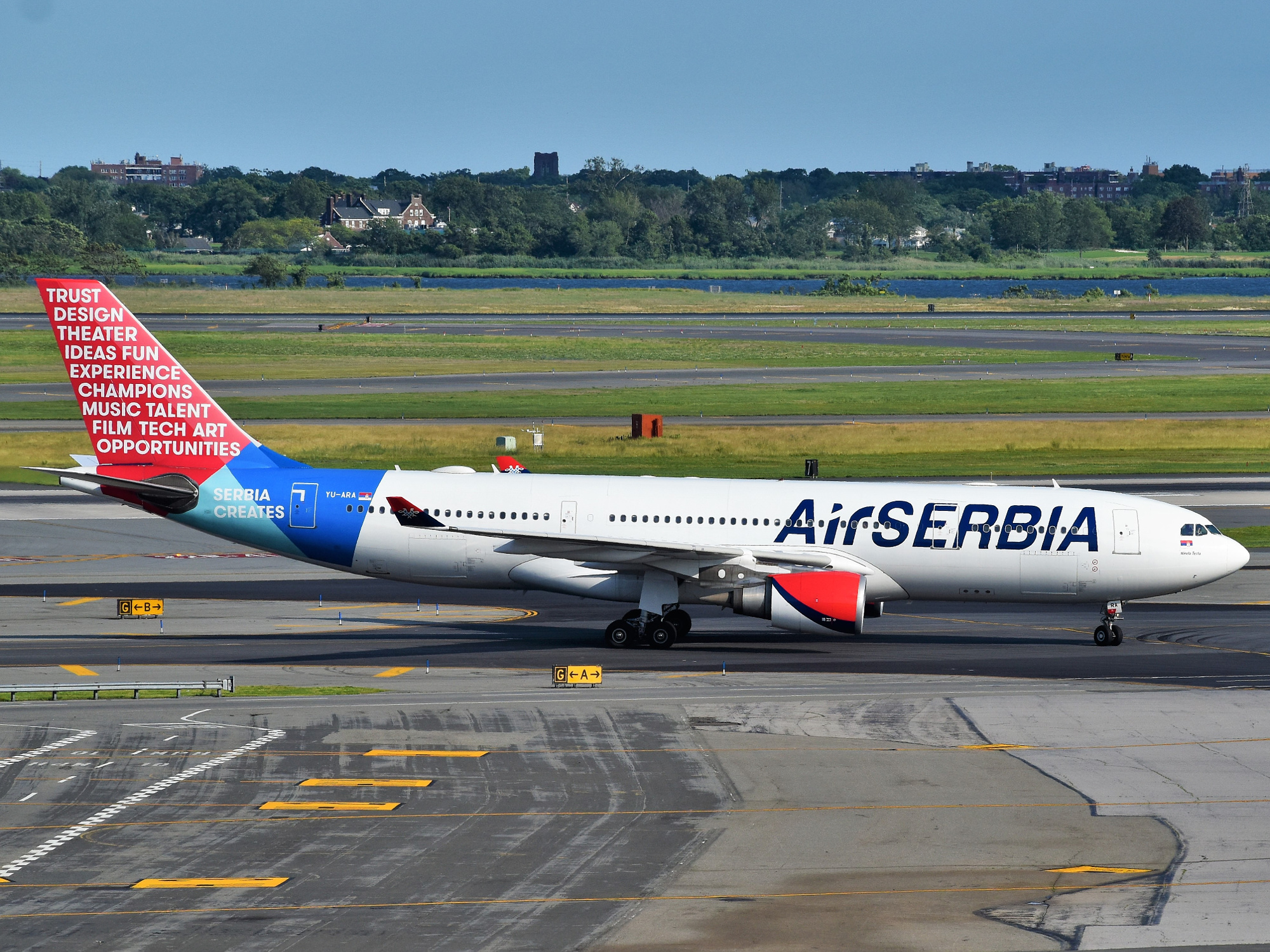
Air Serbia's former Airbus A330-200 in a special Serbia Creates livery (2019)

In 2003, the country was renamed Serbia and Montenegro, and that same year the company was renamed Jat Airways. In 2006, Montenegro declared independence and Jat Airways became the flag carrier of Serbia. An aging fleet and lack of investment made the airline unprofitable, so the Serbian government sought a strategic partner for the company.

On 1 August 2013, Jat Airways and Etihad Airways entered into a strategic partnership agreement under which Etihad would acquire a 49% interest in Jat Airways and its management rights for five years. The Republic of Serbia would retain a controlling interest of 51% and hold five of nine monitoring committee seats in the company. Jat Airways was then reorganized and renamed Air Serbia in October 2013. It launched its inaugural flight from Belgrade to Abu Dhabi on 26 October 2013.

On 23 June 2016, Air Serbia's non-stop flights between Belgrade and New York commenced using an Airbus A330-200 leased from Etihad partner Jet Airways. This transatlantic service became the first non-stop flight operated by a former Yugoslav carrier into the United States since 1992, when all of JAT's long-haul flights were suspended.

Air Serbia implemented an extensive restructuring plan in mid 2017 to improve its performance. The goal was to focus on net profit, a new fare structure, new sales channels, and offer additional services that would increase efficiency. From May to June 2017, it retrofitted its Airbus A319 and A320 fleet with Recaro BL3520 seats to standardize its seating plan. This resulted in a seating capacity increase of 12%. On 24 January 2018, the carrier announced the introduction of a new pricing model that would create four fare types in an effort to unbundle its fares. Passengers can choose from four fare types, with each fare type determining luggage allowance, priority boarding, fast track through the airport, travel date changes, and other entitlements.

On 1 March 2018, Air Serbia opened the Elevate Deli & Bar service on its short and medium-haul flights to give passengers the option to purchase food and drinks on the flight. This service replaced its previous inflight catering and offers one of two menus based on flight length and type of aircraft operating the route. Inflight catering on its long-haul, transatlantic service remains unchanged, with passengers receiving a free meal.

In 2021, the company was awarded the Order of Karađorđe's Star.

Since Serbia did not impose sanctions on Russia following the 2022 Russian invasion of Ukraine, the airline continues to operate regular flights to the country, creating a loophole for Russian citizens to fly to Europe. As a result, the airline has faced dozens of bomb threats which airline officials have attributed to foreign intelligence agencies seeking to disrupt its flights to Russia. In April 2022, it was reported that a NATO military aircraft had trailed an Air Serbia flight as it left Russian airspace.

On 11 January 2025, Air Serbia flight JU986 successfully touched down at Shanghai Pudong International Airport. The plane was welcomed by a water salute ceremony, marking the first direct flight between Shanghai and Belgrade, the capital city of Serbia.

On 16 June 2026, Air Serbia officially launched its own Frequent-flyer program Elevate, replacing Etihad Guest. Starting from October 2026, Banca Intesa and Alta Banka will start issuing Air Serbia co-branded Visa credit and debit cards.

== Corporate affairs ==
=== Ownership structure ===
Originally, Air Serbia was jointly owned by the Government of Serbia, which held a 51 percent share interest, and Etihad Airways, which owned a 49 percent share interest and management control. On 30 December 2020, the Government of Serbia purchased 31% from Etihad, and thus held 82% share interest. In September 2022, the Government of Serbia purchased additional 1.6%, and thus held 83.58% share interest, while Etihad Airways held the remaining.

In November 2023, the Serbian government announced that as of 13 November, the government would take full control of Air Serbia.

=== Business trends ===
Air Serbia's key performance indicators are (years ending December 31):

	2014	2015	2016	2017	2018	2019	2020	2021	2022	2023	2024	2025
Turnover (€m)	262	305	320	288	288	357.9	271.9	247.9	444.4	628.3	701.2	718.3
Net profit/loss (€m)	2.7	3.9	0.9	15.7	12.2	9.5	-77.6	-17.7	21.5	40.6	41.5	35.5
Number of staff (average)				1,488	1,758		1,411	1,094	1,077	1,333	1,523	1,542
Number of staff (year end)						1,465	1,216	1,062	1,128	1,422	1,505	1,514
Number of passengers (m)	2.3	2.5	2.6	2.6	2.4	2.81		1.5	2.75	4.19	4.44	4.57
Passenger load factor (%)	67	71	72.4	73.4	71.2	72		64	72	74.6	74.7	77.3
Cargo carried (kilotonnes)	2.7	3.8	4.9	6.2	6.2			3.5	5	5.7	7.1	
Number of aircraft (at year end)	19	20	21	21	20			18	20	22	27	29
Sources												

=== Subsidiaries ===
==== Aviolet ====
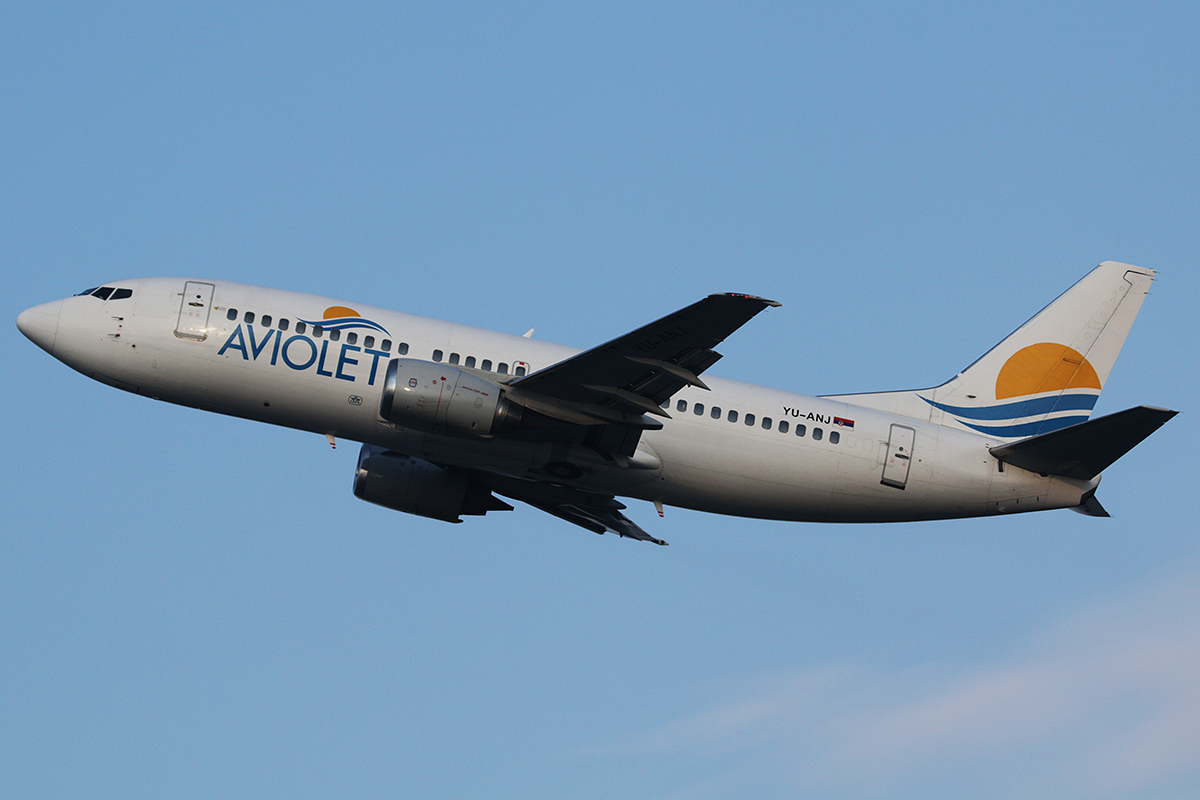
A now retired Aviolet Boeing 737-300 in 2016

In May 2014, Air Serbia launched their now-defunct charter brand, Aviolet (Serbian Cyrillic: Авиолет), using a fleet of three Boeing 737-300 aircraft under Air Serbia's IATA airline code (JU). The majority of Aviolet charter flights were operated during the peak holiday season, which runs from June to September. The first Aviolet-branded flight took off from Belgrade on 4 May 2014, flying to Antalya. As of 2021, Aviolet is defunct as the charter operations were taken over by Air Serbia itself.

==== Air Serbia Ground Services ====
Formerly known as SU-Port, Air Serbia Ground Services (ASGS) was the official provider of aircraft ground handling services in the Republic of Serbia, being certified by Serbia's Civil Aviation Directorate. ASGS provided ground handling operations to passengers, baggage, aircraft, cargo, and mail. Since its founding in 2002, the company handled more than two million passengers and 8500 flights for Air Serbia and other airlines annually. It was discontinued in November 2017, and all employees were transferred to Belgrade Airport.

==== Air Serbia Catering ====
Air Serbia Catering (ASC) is a wholly owned subsidiary of Air Serbia. Located near Nikola Tesla Airport, the company prepares and handles inflight meals for Air Serbia, as well as other carriers flying to and from Belgrade. Founded in 1967 as part of JAT, ASC has operated as an independent company since 2005 and became part of Air Serbia in 2014.

== Destinations ==
As of October 2026, Air Serbia operates flights to 89 destinations in 35 countries from its hub at Belgrade Nikola Tesla Airport, nine destinations in eight countries from Niš Constantine the Great Airport and three destinations in three countries from Morava Airport.

Country	City	Airport	Notes	Refs
Albania	Tirana	Tirana International Airport Nënë Tereza		
Armenia	Yerevan	Zvartnots International Airport	Begins 28 March 2027	
Austria	Salzburg	Salzburg Airport		
Austria	Vienna	Vienna International Airport		
Azerbaijan	Baku	Heydar Aliyev International Airport		
Belgium	Brussels	Brussels Airport		
Bosnia and Herzegovina	Banja Luka	Banja Luka International Airport		
Bosnia and Herzegovina	Mostar	Mostar International Airport		
Bosnia and Herzegovina	Sarajevo	Sarajevo International Airport		
Bulgaria	Sofia	Sofia Airport		
Bulgaria	Varna	Varna Airport	Seasonal	
Canada	Toronto	Toronto Pearson International Airport	Seasonal	
China	Guangzhou	Guangzhou Baiyun International Airport	Ends 27 November 2026	
China	Shanghai	Shanghai Pudong International Airport		
China	Tianjin	Tianjin Binhai International Airport	Terminated	
Croatia	Brač	Brač Airport	Seasonal	
Croatia	Dubrovnik	Dubrovnik Airport		
Croatia	Pula	Pula Airport	Seasonal	
Croatia	Rijeka	Rijeka Airport	Seasonal	
Croatia	Split	Split Airport		
Croatia	Zadar	Zadar Airport	Seasonal	
Croatia	Zagreb	Zagreb Airport		
Cyprus	Larnaca	Larnaca International Airport		
Czech Republic	Prague	Václav Havel Airport Prague		
Denmark	Copenhagen	Copenhagen Airport		
Egypt	Cairo	Cairo International Airport	Terminated	
Egypt	El Dabaa	El Alamein International Airport	Seasonal charter	
Egypt	Hurghada	Hurghada International Airport	Seasonal charter	
Egypt	Mersa Matruh	Marsa Matruh International Airport	Seasonal charter	
Egypt	Sharm El Sheikh	Sharm El Sheikh International Airport	Seasonal charter	
Finland	Helsinki	Helsinki Airport	Resumes 1 April 2027	
France	Lyon	Lyon–Saint-Exupéry Airport	Terminated	
France	Marseille	Marseille Provence Airport	Terminated	
France	Nice	Nice Côte d'Azur Airport		
France	Paris	Charles de Gaulle Airport		
Georgia	Tbilisi	Shota Rustaveli Tbilisi International Airport		
Germany	Berlin	Berlin Brandenburg Airport		
Germany	Berlin	Berlin Tegel Airport	Airport closed	
Germany	Cologne	Cologne Airport		
Germany	Düsseldorf	Düsseldorf Airport		
Germany	Frankfurt	Frankfurt Airport		
Germany	Friedrichshafen	Friedrichshafen Airport	Terminated	
Germany	Hahn	Frankfurt–Hahn Airport		
Germany	Hamburg	Hamburg Airport		
Germany	Hannover	Hannover Airport		
Germany	Karlsruhe/Baden-Baden	Karlsruhe/Baden-Baden Airport	Terminated	
Germany	Munich	Munich Airport		
Germany	Nuremberg	Nuremberg Airport		
Germany	Stuttgart	Stuttgart Airport		
Greece	Athens	Athens International Airport		
Greece	Chania	Chania Airport	Seasonal	
Greece	Corfu	Corfu Airport	Seasonal	
Greece	Heraklion	Heraklion Airport	Seasonal	
Greece	Kavala	Kavala International Airport	Seasonal charter	
Greece	Kefalonia	Kefalonia International Airport	Seasonal charter	
Greece	Mykonos	Mykonos Airport	Seasonal	
Greece	Preveza	Aktion National Airport	Seasonal charter	
Greece	Rhodes	Rhodes Airport	Seasonal	
Greece	Santorini	Santorini International Airport	Seasonal	
Greece	Skiathos	Skiathos International Airport	Seasonal charter	
Greece	Thessaloniki	Thessaloniki Airport		
Greece	Zakynthos	Zakynthos International Airport	Seasonal charter	
Hungary	Budapest	Budapest Ferenc Liszt International Airport		
Israel	Tel Aviv	Ben Gurion Airport	Terminated	
Italy	Alghero	Alghero-Fertilia Airport	Seasonal	
Italy	Bari	Bari Airport		
Italy	Bologna	Bologna Guglielmo Marconi Airport		
Italy	Catania	Catania–Fontanarossa Airport	Seasonal	
Italy	Florence	Florence Airport		
Italy	Milan	Milan Malpensa Airport		
Italy	Naples	Naples International Airport		
Italy	Palermo	Falcone Borsellino Airport	Seasonal	
Italy	Rome	Leonardo da Vinci–Fiumicino Airport		
Italy	Trieste	Trieste Airport	Terminated	
Italy	Venice	Venice Marco Polo Airport		
Jordan	Amman	Queen Alia International Airport	Terminated	
Lebanon	Beirut	Beirut–Rafic Hariri International Airport	Terminated	
Malta	Valletta	Malta International Airport		
Moldova	Chișinău	Chișinău International Airport	Begins 3 June 2027	
Montenegro	Podgorica	Podgorica Airport		
Montenegro	Tivat	Tivat Airport		
Netherlands	Amsterdam	Amsterdam Airport Schiphol		
North Macedonia	Ohrid	Ohrid St. Paul the Apostle Airport	Seasonal	
North Macedonia	Skopje	Skopje International Airport		
Norway	Oslo	Oslo Airport, Gardermoen		
Norway	Tromsø	Tromsø Airport	Begins 14 December 2026	
Poland	Kraków	Kraków John Paul II International Airport		
Poland	Warsaw	Warsaw Chopin Airport	Terminated	
Portugal	Lisbon	Lisbon Airport		
Portugal	Porto	Porto Airport	Seasonal	
Romania	Bucharest	Henri Coandă International Airport		
Romania	Cluj-Napoca	Cluj International Airport	Begins 31 May 2027	
Russia	Kazan	Kazan International Airport		
Russia	Krasnodar	Krasnodar International Airport	Terminated	
Russia	Moscow	Sheremetyevo International Airport		
Russia	Nizhny Novgorod	Strigino International Airport		
Russia	Rostov-on-Don	Platov International Airport	Airport closed	
Russia	Saint Petersburg	Pulkovo Airport		
Russia	Sochi	Sochi International Airport		
Serbia	Belgrade	Belgrade Nikola Tesla Airport	Hub	
Serbia	Kraljevo	Morava Airport	Focus city	
Serbia	Niš	Niš Constantine the Great Airport	Focus city	
Slovenia	Ljubljana	Ljubljana Jože Pučnik Airport		
Spain	Alicante	Alicante–Elche Miguel Hernández Airport		
Spain	Barcelona	Josep Tarradellas Barcelona–El Prat Airport		
Spain	Madrid	Adolfo Suárez Madrid–Barajas Airport		
Spain	Málaga	Málaga Airport		
Spain	Menorca	Menorca Airport	Begins 16 June 2027	
Spain	Palma de Mallorca	Palma de Mallorca Airport	Seasonal	
Spain	Seville	Seville Airport		
Spain	Tenerife	Tenerife South Airport		
Spain	Valencia	Valencia Airport		
Sweden	Gothenburg	Göteborg Landvetter Airport		
Sweden	Stockholm	Stockholm Arlanda Airport		
Switzerland	Geneva	Geneva Airport		
Switzerland	Zürich	Zürich Airport		
Tunisia	Monastir	Monastir Habib Bourguiba International Airport	Seasonal charter	
Turkey	Ankara	Ankara Esenboğa Airport	Terminated	
Turkey	Antalya	Antalya Airport	Seasonal charter	
Turkey	Bodrum	Milas–Bodrum Airport	Seasonal charter	
Turkey	Dalaman	Dalaman Airport	Seasonal charter	
Turkey	Istanbul	Istanbul Airport		
Turkey	Istanbul	Atatürk Airport	Terminated	
Turkey	İzmir	İzmir Adnan Menderes Airport	Seasonal	
Ukraine	Kyiv	Boryspil International Airport	Airport closed	
Ukraine	Lviv	Lviv Danylo Halytskyi International Airport	Terminated	
United Arab Emirates	Abu Dhabi	Abu Dhabi International Airport	Terminated	
United Kingdom	London	Heathrow Airport		
United States	Chicago	O'Hare International Airport		
United States	New York City	John F. Kennedy International Airport		
United States	Miami	Miami International Airport	Begins 20 May 2027	

=== Codeshare agreements ===
Air Serbia has codeshare agreements with the following airlines:

- Aegean Airlines
- Air China
- Air Europa
- Air France
- airBaltic
- Azerbaijan Airlines
- Bulgaria Air
- China Southern Airlines
- Etihad Airways
- Finnair
- ITA Airways
- JetBlue
- KLM
- Qatar Airways
- TAROM
- Turkish Airlines

== Fleet ==
=== Current fleet ===
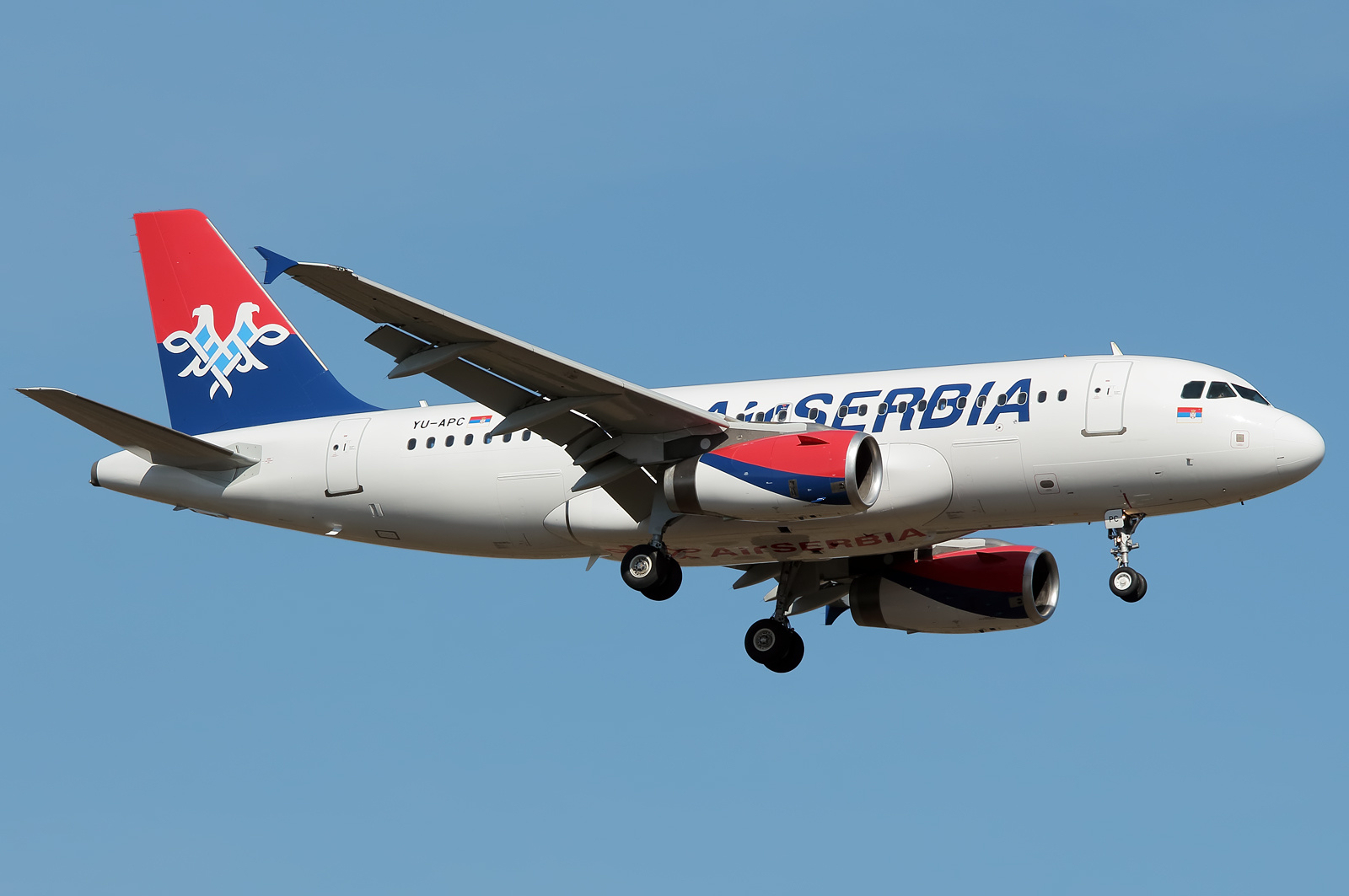
Air Serbia Airbus A319

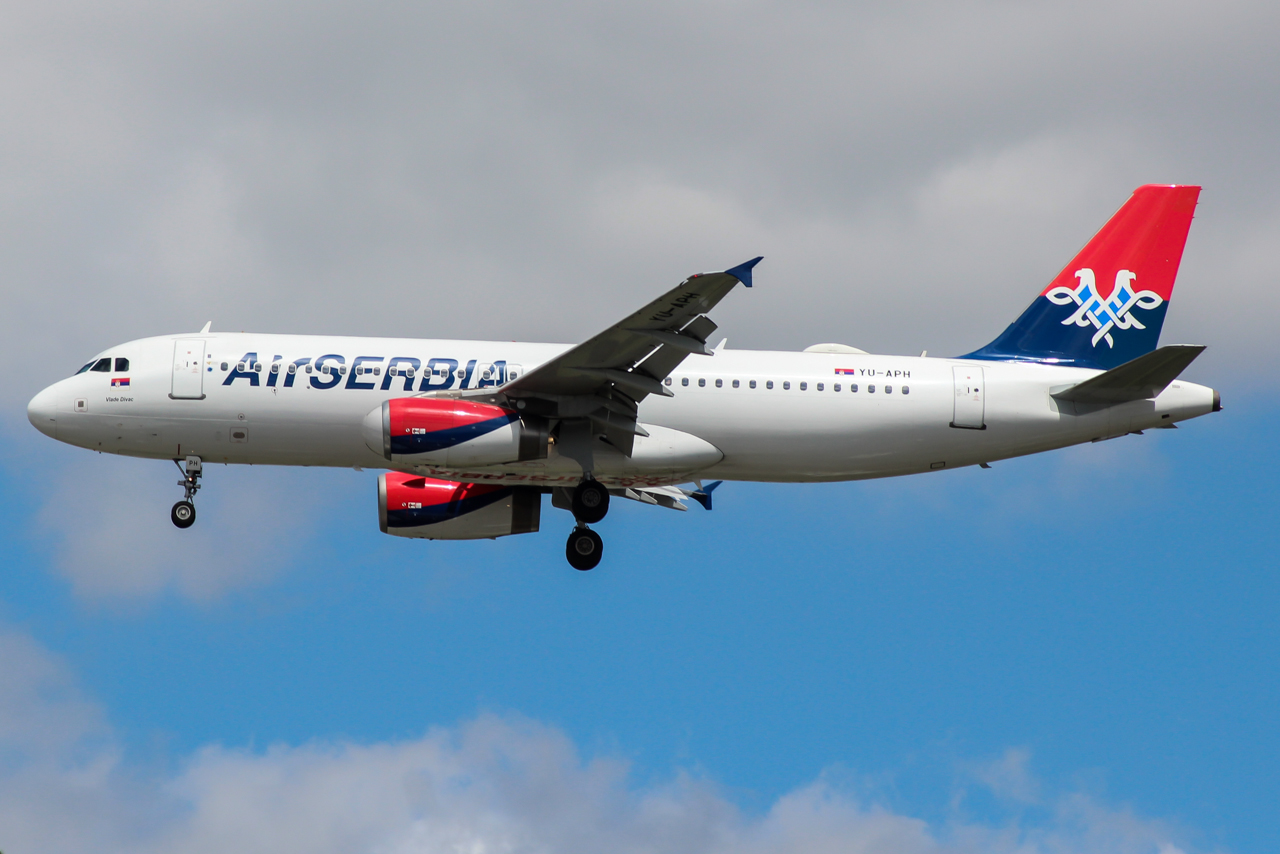
Air Serbia Airbus A320

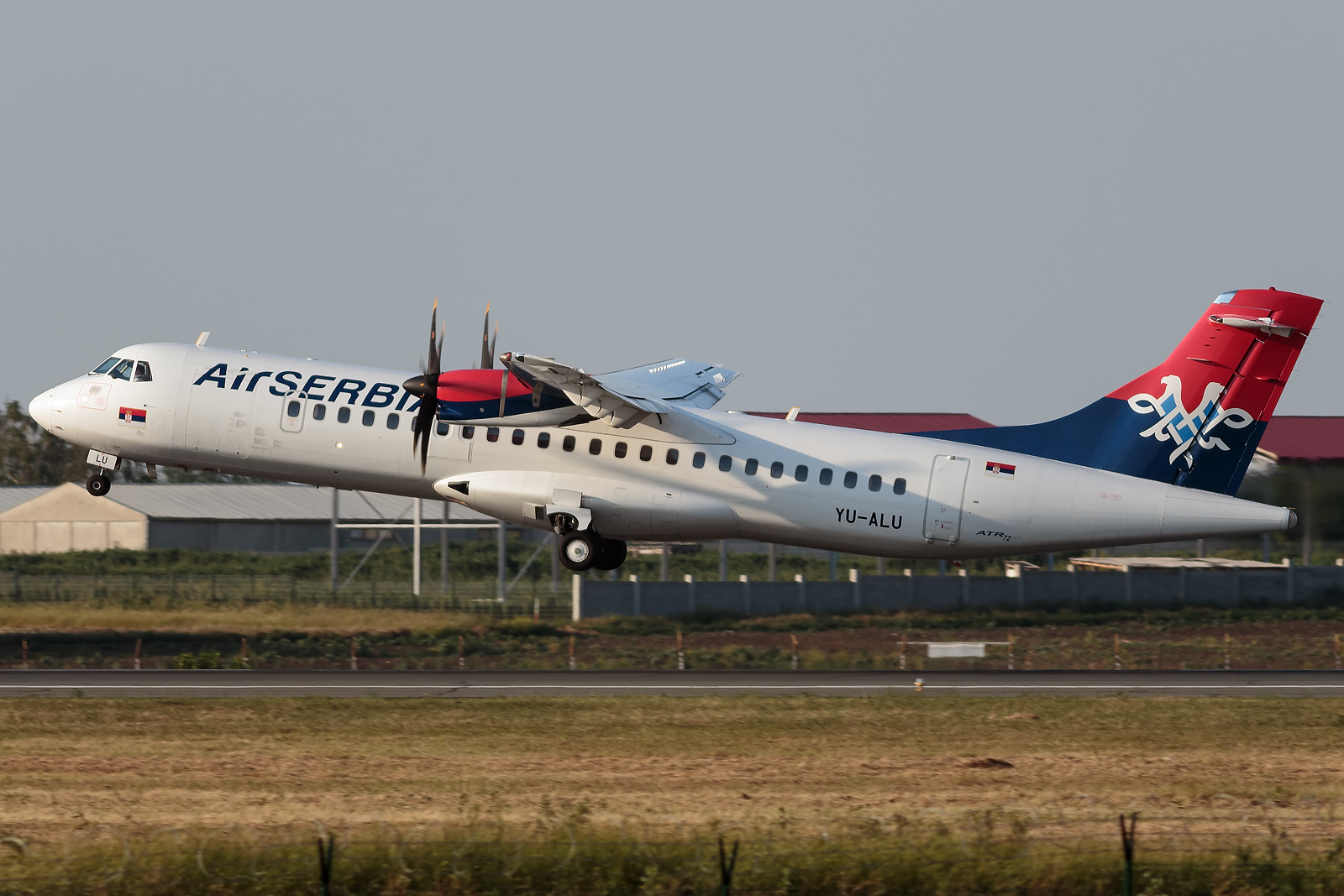
Air Serbia ATR 72

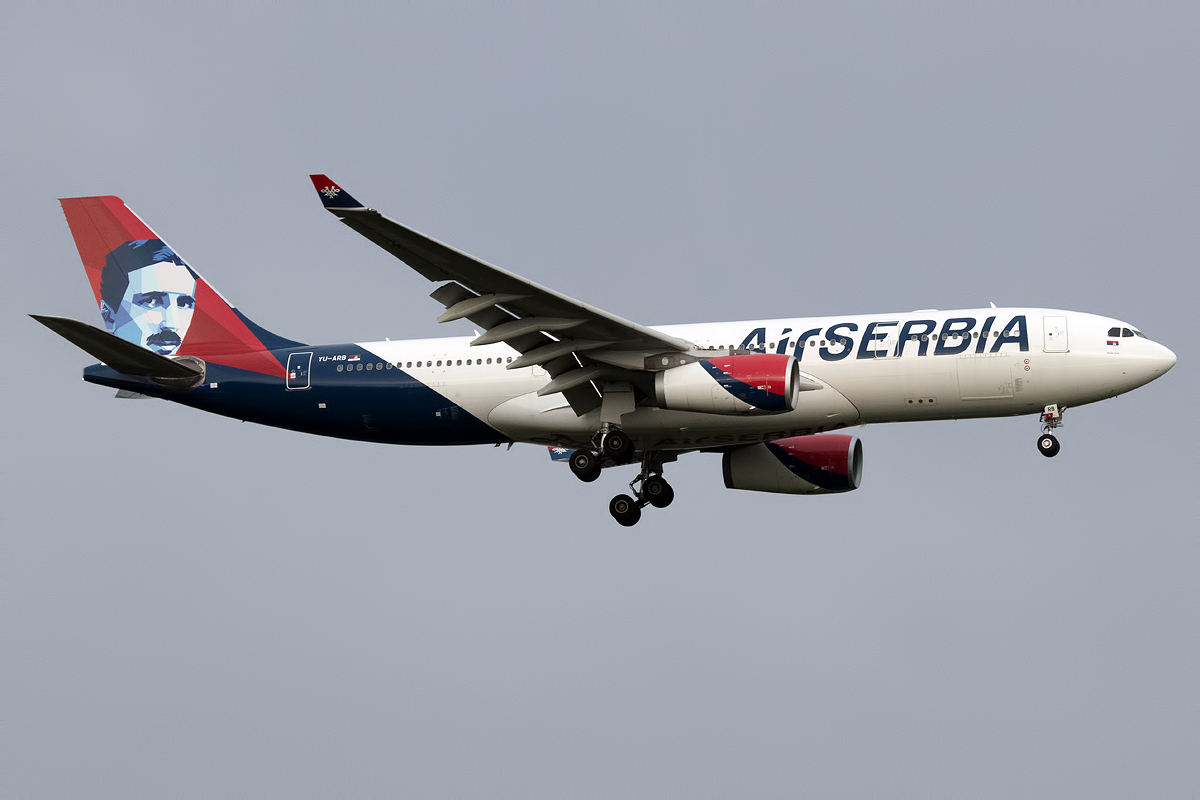
Air Serbia Airbus A330-200 in a special livery depicting Nikola Tesla

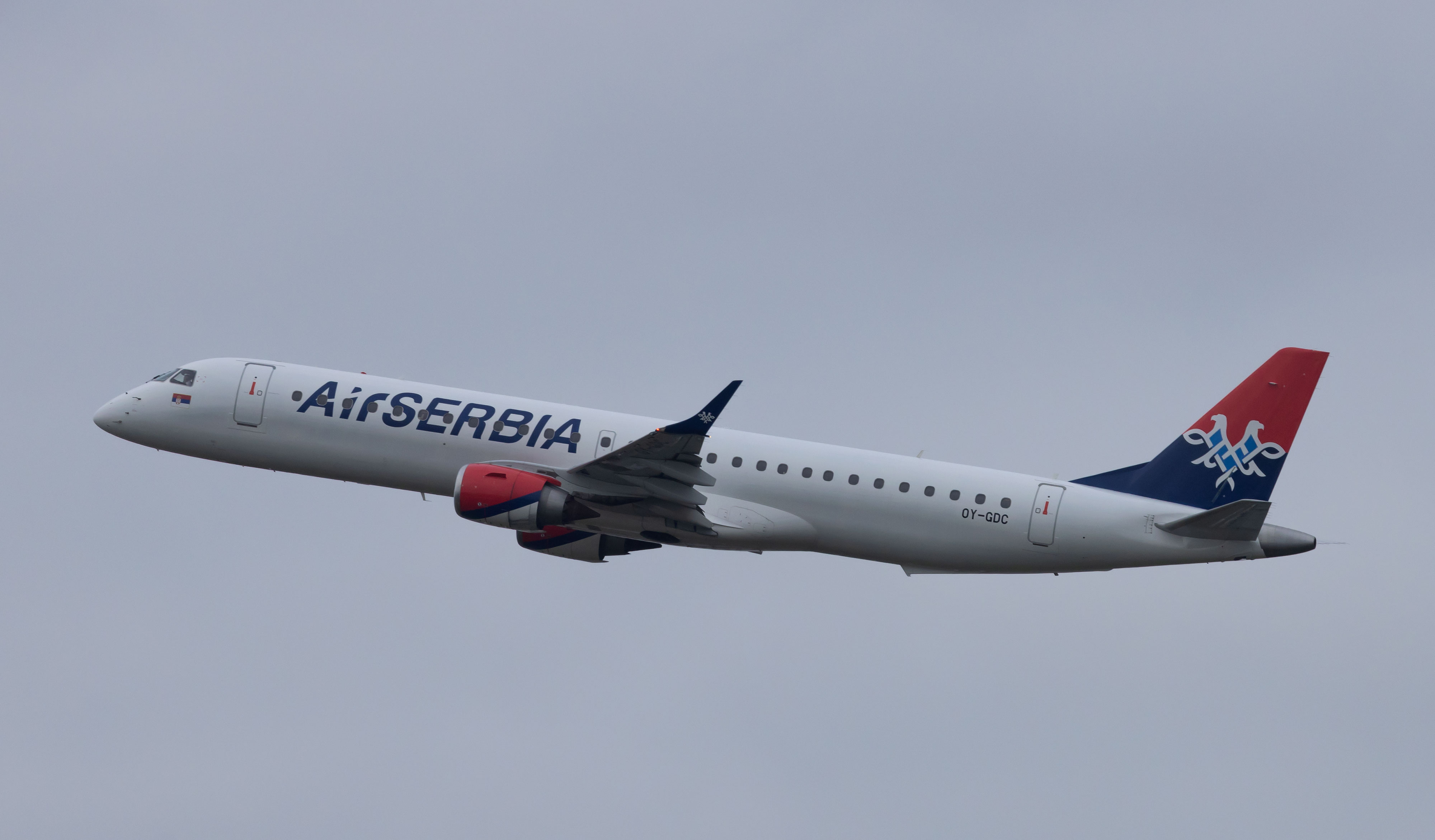
Air Serbia Embraer 195

As of November 2026, Air Serbia operates the following aircraft:

Air Serbia fleet
Aircraft	In service	Orders	Passengers				Notes
Aircraft	In service	Orders	J	Y	Total	Ref	Notes
Airbus A319-100	7	—	var.	var.	144		To be retired and replaced by E-Jet and A320 aircraft.
Airbus A320-200	6	3	var.	var.	180		To replace A319 aircraft.
Airbus A330-200	1	—	21	236	257		To be reconfigured to 262-seat configuration.
Airbus A330-200	1	—	18	250	268		To be reconfigured to 262-seat configuration.
Airbus A330-200	2	—	22	240	262		Painted in Expo 2027 livery.
ATR 72-600	8	—	—	72	72		
ATR 72-600	2	—	—	70	70		To be reconfigured to 72-seat configuration.
Embraer 195	4	1	var	var	118		To replace A319 aircraft.
Total	31	4					

=== Livery ===
Introduced in October 2013, Air Serbia's livery was created by graphic designer Tamara Maksimović. Featuring Serbia's national colours – red, blue, and white – the design, with its graphical elements and details, is based on Serbian medieval art. The carrier's logo, featured on the tail, is a stylized double-headed eagle inspired by the Serbian coat-of-arms. The carrier's name and logo can be seen on both the fuselage and belly of each aircraft.

In 2013, the airline launched the "Living Legends" initiative, which pays tribute to famous Serbian citizens who have made positive contributions to society, both in Serbia and abroad. In recognition of its success, Air Serbia names each aircraft after them. Such individuals include inventor and engineer Nikola Tesla, tennis player Novak Djokovic, former NBA player Vlade Divac, former footballer and manager Dejan Stanković, actor Miki Manojlović, and musician Goran Bregović.

=== Retired fleet ===
- Boeing 737-300
- ATR 72-200
- ATR 72-500

== Accidents and incidents ==
- On 18 February 2024, Air Serbia Flight 324, an Embraer 195 wet leased from Marathon Airlines with 106 passengers and crew on board, sustained serious damage to its fuselage and tail after hitting the runway's instrument landing system array during takeoff at Belgrade Nikola Tesla Airport on its way to Düsseldorf. The aircraft turned back after failing to gain altitude and was safely evacuated upon landing. As a result, Air Serbia terminated its wet-lease contract with Marathon Airlines days after the accident.

== See also ==
- List of airports in Serbia
- Transport in Serbia
