= Belgrade Nikola Tesla Airport =

Main international airport of Serbia

Belgrade Nikola Tesla Airport Аеродром Никола Тесла Београд

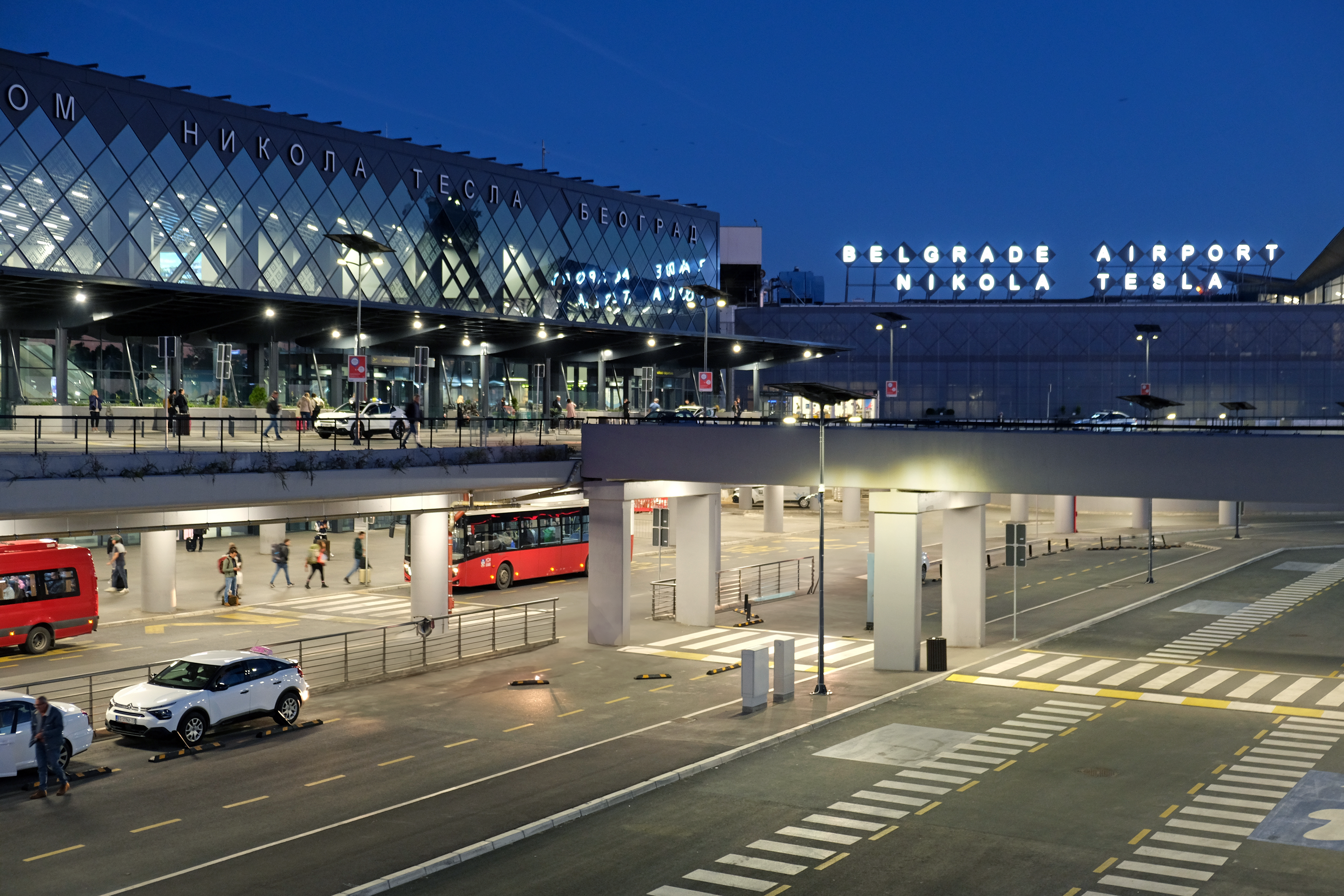
- Belgrade Nikola Tesla Airport in 2023
- IATA: BEG; ICAO: LYBE

Summary
- Airport type: International
- Owner: Government of Serbia
- Operator: VINCI Airports Serbia d.o.o.
- Serves: Belgrade
- Location: Belgrade, Serbia
- Hub for: Air Serbia
- Operating base for: Wizz Air
- Elevation AMSL: 336 ft (102 m)
- Coordinates: 44°49′10″N 20°18′25″E
- Website: beg.aero

Map
- Interactive map of Belgrade Nikola Tesla Airport

Runways
Direction	Length		Surface
Direction	m	ft	Surface
12L/30R	3,400	11,155	Asphalt/concrete
12R/30L	3,500	11,483	Asphalt/concrete

Statistics (2025)
- Passengers: 8,911,987 ▲6.5%
- Aircraft movements: 89,480 ▲3.9%
- Cargo volume: N/A
- Source: Vinci Airports Press Release

Belgrade Nikola Tesla Airport
- Native name: Аеродром Никола Тесла Београд
- Romanized name: Aerodrom Nikola Tesla Beograd
- Type: Joint-stock company
- Traded as: BELEX: AERO
- Industry: Airport operations
- Founded: 28 April 1962; 64 years ago
- Headquarters: Aerodrom Beograd 47, Surčin, Belgrade, Serbia
- Area served: Belgrade, Serbia
- Key people: Saša Vlaisavljević (CEO); Vesna Stanković Jevđević (Chairman of the Supervisory Board)
- Revenue: ▲€5.96 million (2021)
- Net income: ▼ (€2.15 million) (2021)
- Total assets: ▲€275.18 million (2021)
- Total equity: ▼€244.00 million (2021)
- Owner: Government of Serbia (84.56%); Others
- Number of employees: 1,556 (2018)
- Parent: Vinci Airports
- Footnotes; Business ID: 07036540; Tax ID: 100000539

Belgrade Nikola Tesla Airport (Serbian: Аеродром Никола Тесла Београд / Aerodrom Nikola Tesla Beograd), or Belgrade Airport (Serbian: Аеродром Београд / Aerodrom Beograd) (IATA: BEG, ICAO: LYBE), is an international airport serving Belgrade, Serbia. It is the largest and the busiest airport in Serbia, situated 18 km (11 mi) west of downtown Belgrade near the suburb of Surčin, surrounded by fertile lowlands. It is operated by Vinci Airports (subsidiary of the French conglomerate Vinci) and is named after Serbian inventor Nikola Tesla (1856–1943).

The flag carrier and the largest airline of Serbia, Air Serbia, uses Belgrade Nikola Tesla as its hub. It is also one of the many operating bases for low-cost airline Wizz Air. The air taxi services Air Pink, Eagle Express and Prince Aviation also call the airport their home.

== History ==
=== First airfields ===
The first airfield in Belgrade was inaugurated in 1910 in the neighbourhood of Banjica and was initially used by aviation pioneers such as Simon, Maslenikov, Vidmar and Čermak. Two years later a wooden hangar was built for the Serbian Air Force, which was at the time engaged in the First Balkan War against Turkey. In 1914, the Banjica airfield was the base for the Serbian Air Force squadron and the Balloon Company. After the end of the First World War, the Banjica airfield was used for airmail traffic and included the routes Novi Sad–Belgrade–Niš–Skopje and Belgrade–Sarajevo–Mostar.

In 1911 another airfield was inaugurated in Belgrade, in the lower city of the Kalemegdan Fortress at the location of today's Belgrade Planetarium.

=== Airport in Pančevo ===
An airport on the outskirts of Pančevo, a town located northeast of Belgrade, began its operations in 1923 when CFRNA inaugurated the international route Paris–Istanbul, which was flown via Belgrade. In the same year, on that route, the first ever world night flight occurred. The same year airmail service began operating from the airport. The Pančevo airport was also used by the Royal Yugoslav Air Force academy. After World War II, the airport was used by the Yugoslav Air Force before it became the airfield of the Utva Aviation Industry after its relocation from Zemun to Pančevo.

=== Airport in Dojno Polje (New Belgrade) ===
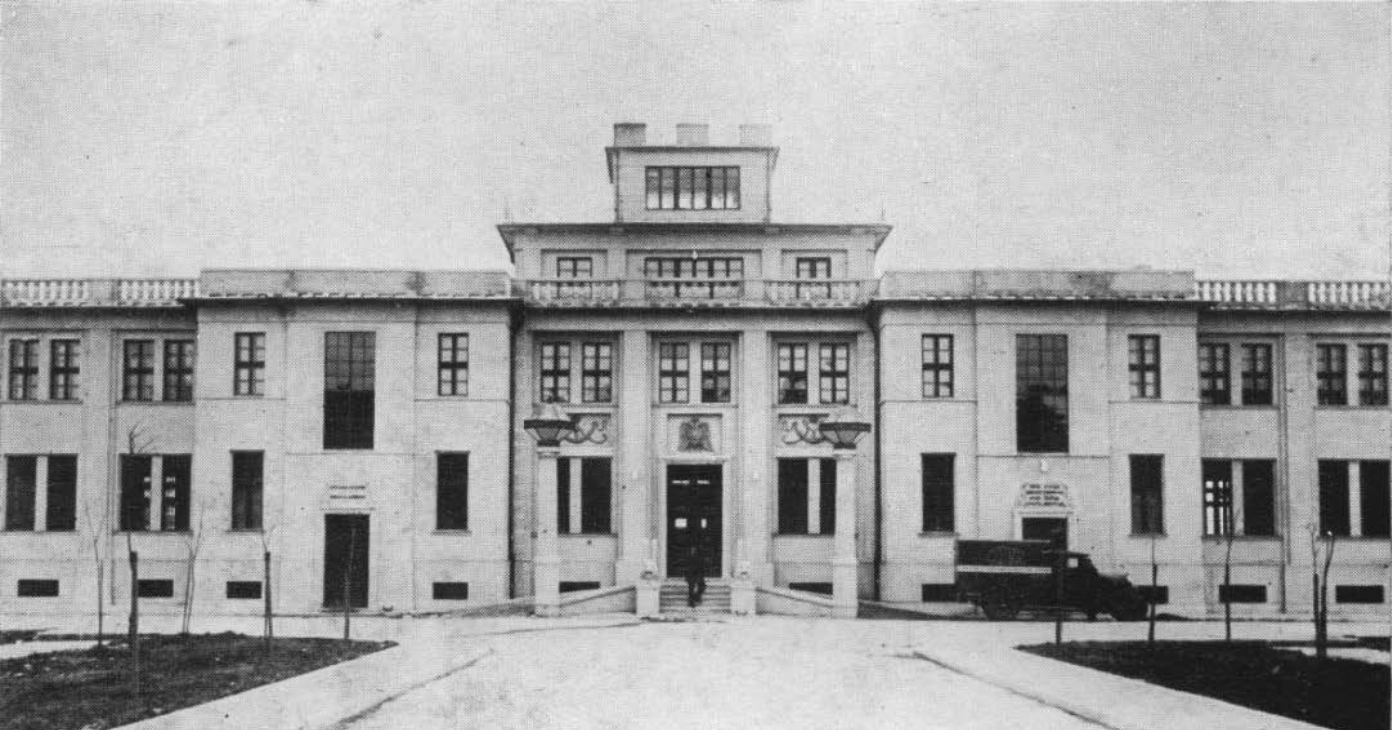
Belgrade International Airport in the early 1930s

Because of the distance from Pančevo to downtown Belgrade, which at that time required crossing the Danube, a decision was made to build a new airport that would be closer. The airport was planned to be built just across the river Sava, in a neighborhood today known as Novi Beograd. It was opened on 25 March 1927 under the official name of Belgrade International Airport (also known as Dojno Polje Airport). From February 1928, the aircraft owned by the first local airline Aeroput started taking off from the new airport. The airport had four 1,100–2,900 metres (3,610–9,510 ft) long grass runways. The design for a reinforced concrete hangar that was built at the airfield was made by the Serbian scientist Milutin Milanković, better known for his theory of climate change. A modern terminal building was built in 1931, while the landing equipment for conditions of poor visibility was installed in 1936.

Before World War II, Belgrade was also used as a stopover for some major air races, such as The Schlesinger African Air Race.

Besides Aeroput, Air France, Deutsche Luft Hansa, KLM, Imperial Airways, LOT Polish Airlines and airlines from Italy, Austria, Hungary and Romania also used the airport until the outbreak of the Second World War. Belgrade gained further prominence when Imperial Airways introduced inter-continental routes through Belgrade, when London was linked with India through the airport. Belgrade was linked with Paris and Breslau because CIDNA and Deutsche Luft Hansa, respectively, included Belgrade on its routes to Istanbul. By 1931, Belgrade became a major air hub being linked with regular flights with international destinations such as London, Madrid, Venice, Brussels, Berlin, Cologne, Warsaw, Prague, Vienna, Graz, Klagenfurt, Budapest, Bucharest, Sofia, Varna, Thessaloniki, Athens, Istanbul, and also intercontinental links with Cairo, Karachi and India.

Starting from April 1941, German occupation forces used the airport. During 1944 it was bombed by the Allies, and in October of the same year the German army destroyed the remaining facilities while withdrawing from the country.

The airport was rebuilt by October 1944, and until the end of the war was used by the Soviet Union and Yugoslavia as part of the Allied war effort.

Civil transport by Yugoslav Air Force cargo planes from this airport was reinstated at the end of 1945. At the beginning of 1947 JAT Yugoslav Airlines and JUSTA took over domestic and international traffic, and from 1948 Western European airlines resumed flights to Belgrade.

A constant increase in traffic and the beginning of the passenger jet era called for a significant expansion of the airport. In the meantime, a plan to build a residential and business district called Novi Beograd on the location of the airport was introduced. The officials decided therefore that a new international airport should be built near the village of Surčin to the west. The last flight to depart from the old airport was early in 1964.

=== Airport in Surčin ===
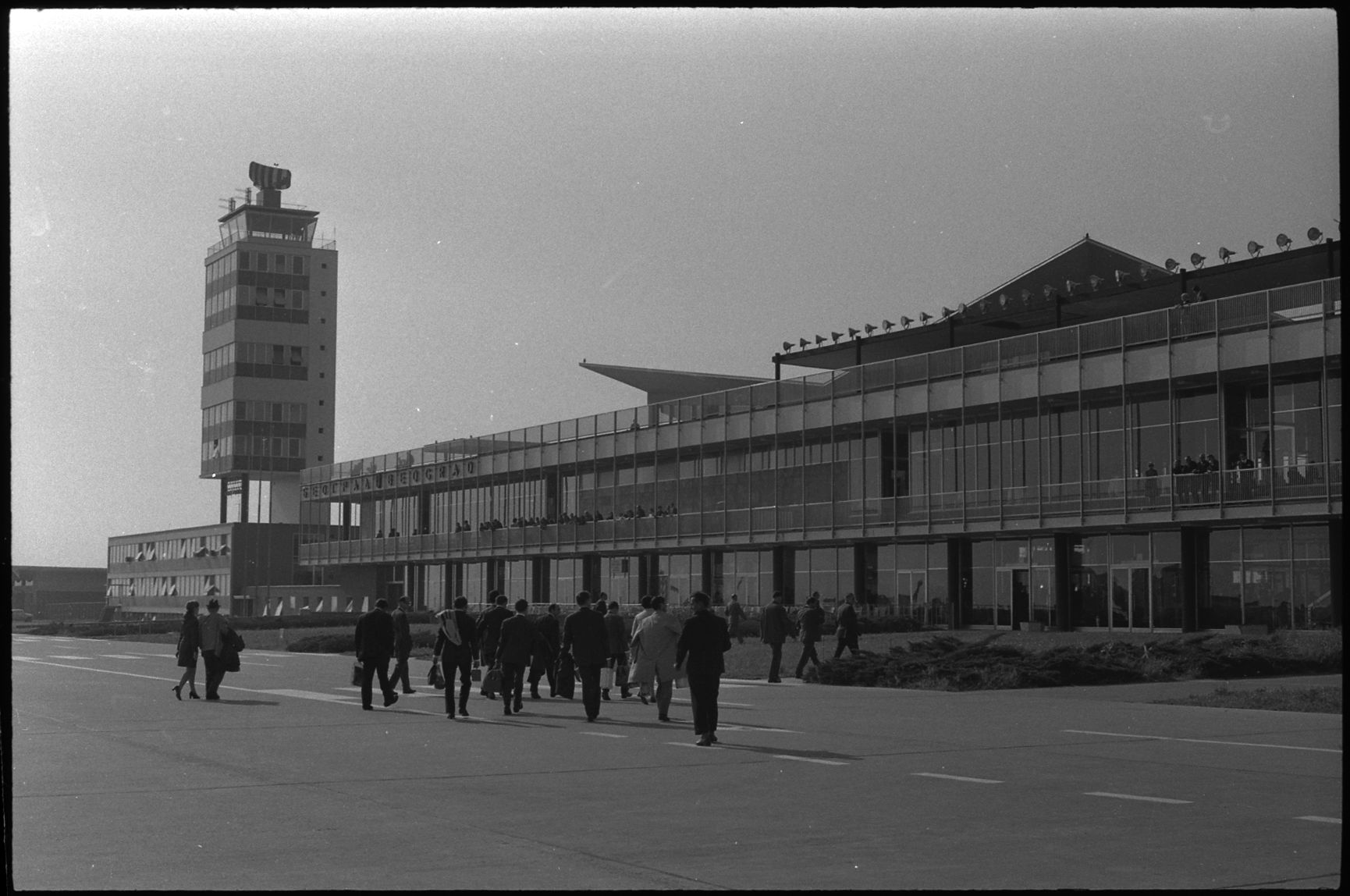
Belgrade Airport in 1968

The new location for the airport was on the Surčin plateau, 15 km (9.3 mi) from Belgrade's city centre. Thanks to the original planners' vision, two conditions for the airport's development were fulfilled: a location was chosen that met the navigational, meteorological, construction, technical, and traffic requirements; and the special needs for the airport's long-term development were established.

Building of the new airport started in April 1958 and lasted until 28 April 1962, when it was officially opened by President Josip Broz Tito. During that period a 3,000-metre-long (9,800 ft) runway was built, with the parallel taxiway and concrete aprons for sixteen airplanes. The passenger terminal building occupied an area of 8,000 m^{2} (86,000 sq ft). Cargo storage spaces were also built, as well as a technical block with the air-traffic control tower and other accompanying facilities. Modern navigational equipment was installed, earning the airport the highest international classification according to the International Civil Aviation Organization.

The airport stagnated during the 1990s after the outbreak of the Yugoslav wars and the United Nations sanctions imposed on the Serbia and Montenegro. The sanctions also included a ban on air travel. The airport had minimal passenger movement, and many facilities were in need of reparation.

With a change in government and international sentiment, normal air traffic resumed in 2001. A few years later the airport's terminal 2 underwent a major reconstruction. The runway was upgraded to CAT IIIb in 2005, as part of a large renovation project. CAT IIIb is an Instrument Landing System (ILS), giving aircraft the security of landing during fog and storms. In 2006, the airport was renamed to Belgrade Nikola Tesla Airport. Nikola Tesla was a Serbian-American inventor and scientist, generally considered one of the world's most famous inventors. The construction of the new air traffic control centre was completed in 2010. In 2011 Belgrade Nikola Tesla Airport shares (AERO) began trading on the Belgrade Stock Exchange (BELEX).

=== 2012–2018 ===
In 2012, construction work on the modernization and expansion of the airport began. It was carried out on the expansion and reconstruction of the A-gate and C-gate departure and transit areas. As a result, an extra 2,750 square metres (29,600 sq ft) was added. Jetways at the A and C gates were also replaced.

Also, there were plans for the construction of a new control tower as the current air control tower was built in 1962. Future expansion of current terminals should see additional 17,000 m^{2} (180,000 sq ft) added, with terminal 2 obtaining an additional 4 jetways.

=== 2018–present ===
In January 2018, the Government of Serbia granted a 25-year concession of the Belgrade Nikola Tesla Airport to the French airport operator Vinci Airports for a sum of 501 million euros. On 21 December 2018, Vinci formally took over the airport. In 2018, the airport had a sizeable increase in revenue and net income, due to Vinci Airports transaction. On 24 April 2024, Serbian finance minister Siniša Mali announced that the concession of Belgrade Nikola Tesla Airport had been extended by 18 months in order to minimize the influence of COVID-19 Pandemic. The concession is to last until 1 July 2044.

== Terminals ==
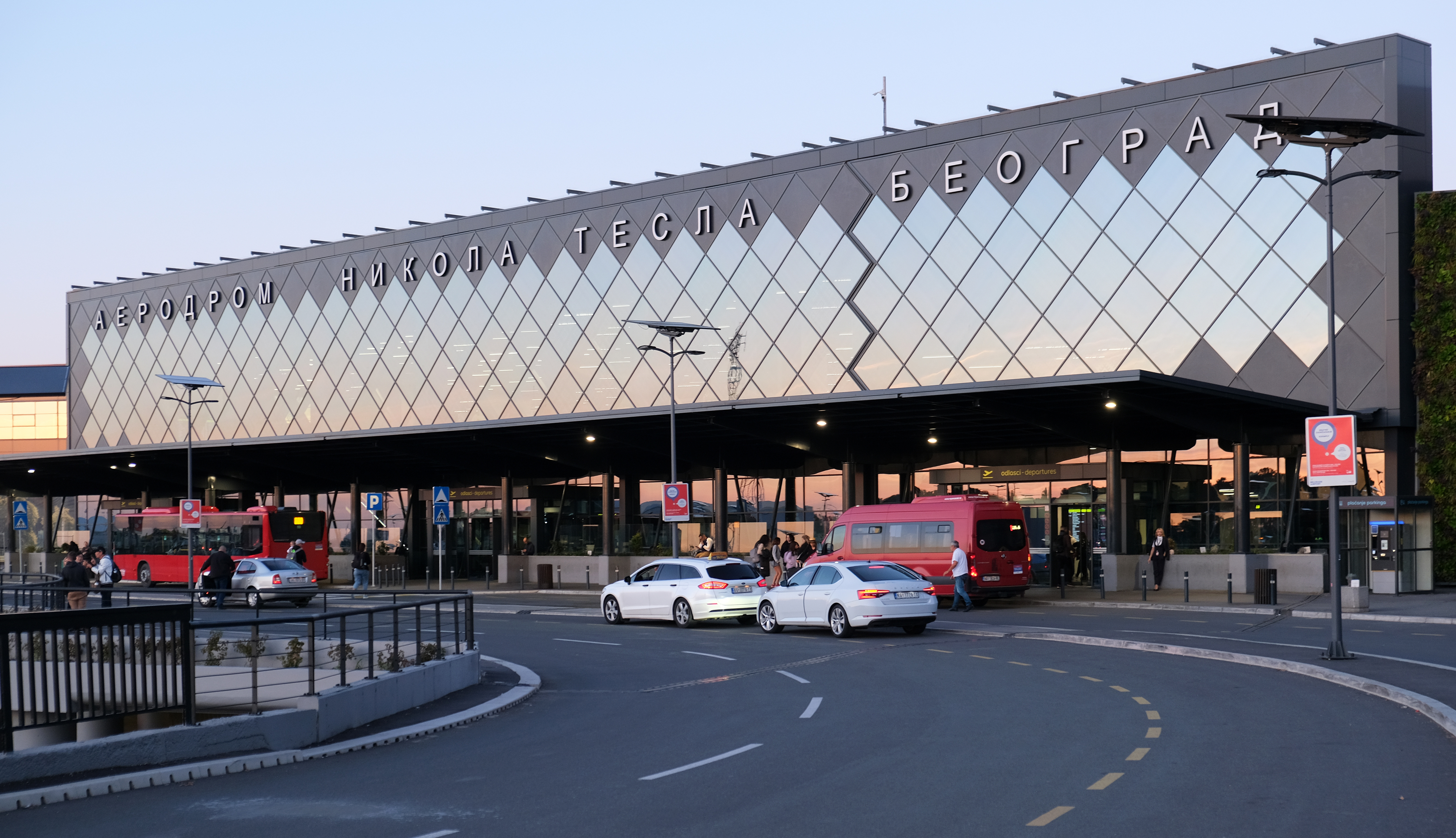
Terminal exterior

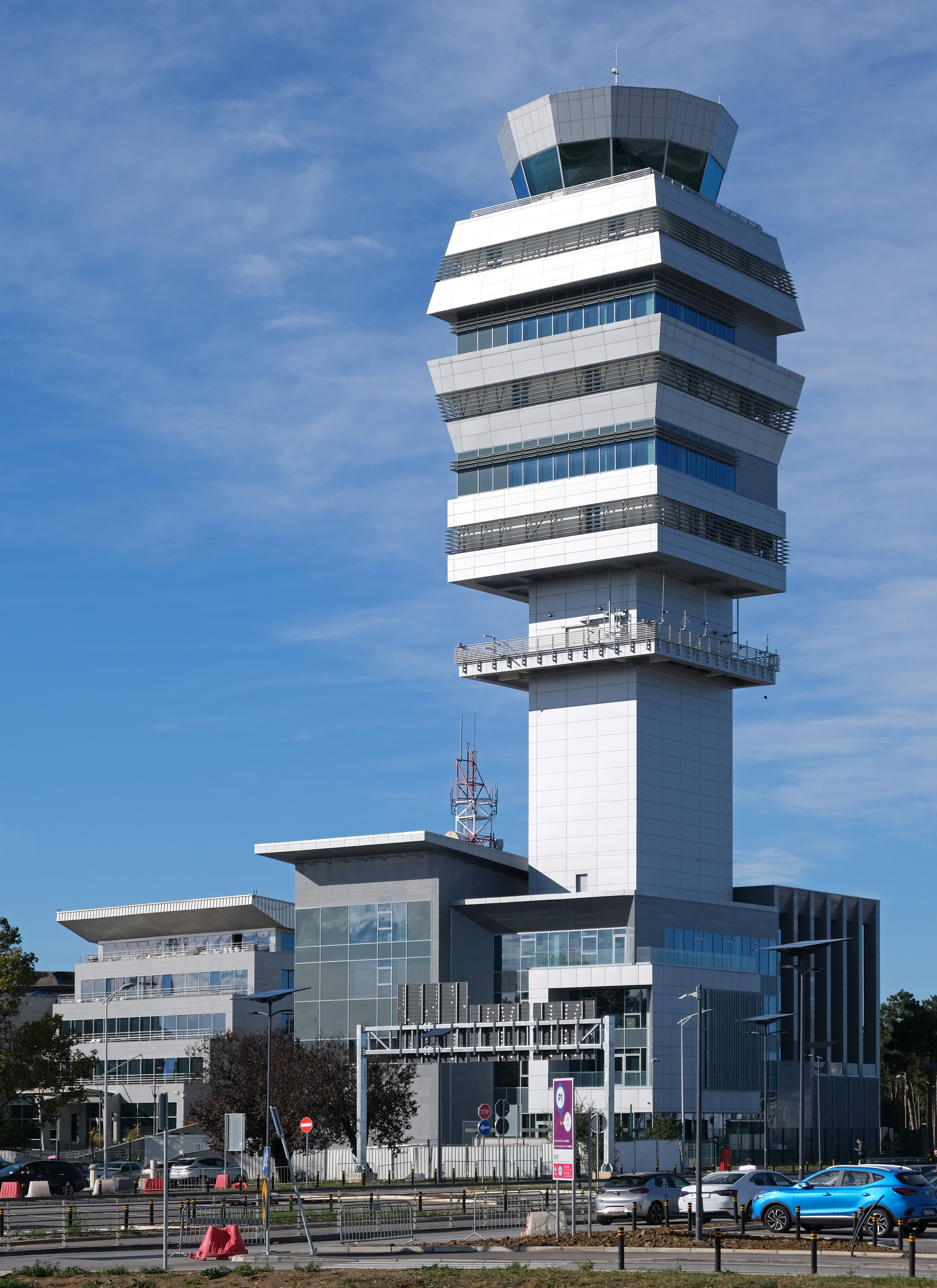
Air traffic control tower

The airport's two terminals have a combined area of 93,651 square metres (1,008,050 sq ft), with Terminal 2 being larger of the two, the two terminals are connected by a hallway. The airport has 90 check-in counters and 32 gates (of which 24 are equipped with jetways). Gates A1-A10 and C1-C14 are equipped with jetways, gates A7a, A7b and C10a-C10e use buses, while gate A11 is used for domestic flights to Niš.

=== Terminal 1 ===
Terminal 1 (T1) was the original and only terminal when the airport was built. The terminal handled domestic flights during the time of Yugoslavia and Serbia and Montenegro, and subsequently has come to be used for international flights, mostly by low-cost and charter airlines. The terminal went through a major renovation in 2016 and 2017 when the interior was overhauled.

=== Terminal 2 ===
Terminal 2 (T2) was constructed in 1979 for the airport's growing passenger numbers. The terminal has a capacity of 5 million passengers. The terminal contains airline offices, transfer desks and various retail shops. The terminal went through two major renovations: from 2004 through 2006, with the arrivals and departures areas of the terminal completely reconstructed, and another one in 2012 and 2013 when there were works on expansion and overhaul of the C platform. While not officially confirmed, it is believed that the overhauled T1 will be used by foreign carriers, while Air Serbia and Etihad Airways Partners would gain exclusive use of Terminal 2.

== Airlines and destinations ==
=== Passenger ===
The following airlines operate regular scheduled and charter flights as of October 2026:

Airlines	Destinations
Aegean Airlines	Athens
airBaltic	Seasonal: Riga
Air Cairo	Hurghada
Air Montenegro	Podgorica, Tivat
Air Serbia	Alicante, Amsterdam, Athens, Baku, Banja Luka, Barcelona, Bari, Berlin, Bologna, Brussels, Bucharest–Otopeni, Budapest, Chicago–O'Hare, Chișinău (begins 3 June 2027), Cluj–Napoca (begins 31 May 2027), Copenhagen, Dubrovnik, Düsseldorf, Frankfurt, Florence, Geneva, Guangzhou (ends 27 November 2026), Hamburg, Hannover, Helsinki (resumes 1 April 2027), Istanbul, Kazan, Kraków, Larnaca, Lisbon, Ljubljana, London–Heathrow, Madrid, Málaga, Malta, Miami (begins 20 May 2027), Milan–Malpensa, Moscow–Sheremetyevo, Mostar, Munich, New York–JFK, Nice, Niš, Nizhny Novgorod, Nuremberg, Oslo, Paris–Charles de Gaulle, Podgorica, Prague, Rome–Fiumicino, Saint Petersburg, Salzburg, Sarajevo, Seville, Shanghai–Pudong, Skopje, Sochi, Sofia, Split, Stockholm–Arlanda, Stuttgart, Tbilisi, Tenerife–South , Thessaloniki, Tirana, Tivat, Valencia, Venice, Vienna, Yerevan (begins 28 March 2027), Zagreb, Zürich; Seasonal: Alghero, Brač, Catania, Chania, Corfu, Gothenburg, Heraklion, Izmir, Menorca (begins 16 June 2027), Mykonos, Naples, Ohrid, Palermo, Palma de Mallorca, Porto, Pula, Rhodes, Rijeka, Santorini, Toronto–Pearson, Tromsø (begins 14 December 2026), Varna, Zadar; Seasonal charter: Antalya, Bodrum, Dalaman, El Dabaa, Hurghada, Kavala, Kefalonia, Marsa Matruh, Monastir, Preveza/Lefkada, Sharm El Sheikh, Skiathos, Zakynthos
AJet	Ankara, Istanbul–Sabiha Gökçen, Izmir; Seasonal charter: Konya
Arkia	Tel Aviv
Austrian Airlines	Vienna
China Southern Airlines	Guangzhou
easyJet	Geneva, Paris–Charles de Gaulle
Eurowings	Seasonal: Cologne
flydubai	Dubai–International
FlyOne	Yerevan (begins 15 December 2026)
Hainan Airlines	Beijing–Capital
KLM	Amsterdam
LOT Polish Airlines	Warsaw–Chopin
Lufthansa	Frankfurt, Munich
Norwegian Air Shuttle	Oslo
Nouvelair	Seasonal charter: Djerba, Monastir
Pegasus Airlines	Istanbul–Sabiha Gökçen
Qatar Airways	Doha
Royal Jordanian	Amman–Queen Alia (resumes 27 October 2027)
SCAT Airlines	Astana
Sky Express	Seasonal charter: Heraklion, Rhodes
Sundor	Tel Aviv
Swiss International Air Lines	Zürich
Turkish Airlines	Istanbul
Wizz Air	Alicante, Barcelona, Basel/Mulhouse, Berlin, Dortmund, Eindhoven, Gothenburg, Hamburg, Karlsruhe/Baden-Baden, Larnaca, London–Luton, Madrid (ends 8 January 2027), Malmö, Malta, Memmingen, Milan Bergamo, Nice, Paris Beauvais, Rome–Fiumicino, Stockholm–Skavsta; Seasonal: Alghero, Chania, Palermo, Pisa

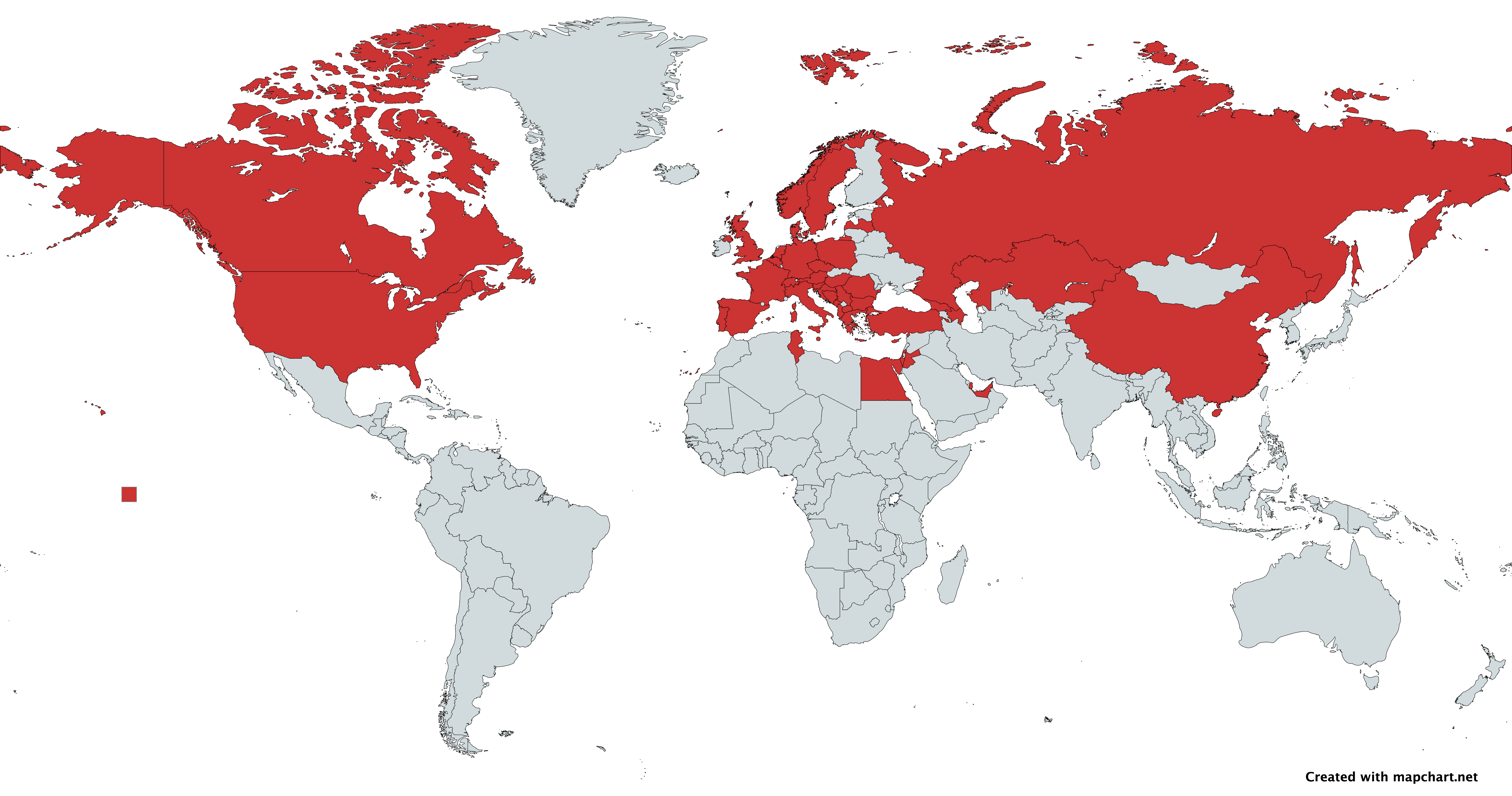
Belgrade Airport passenger destinations

=== Cargo ===
The following cargo airlines served the airport on a regular basis:

Airlines	Destinations
Cargoair	Linz
DHL Aviation	Leipzig/Halle, Milan–Malpensa
Turkish Cargo	Istanbul
YTO Cargo Airlines	Aktobe, Ürümqi

== Statistics ==
=== Traffic figures ===
Year	Passengers	Change	Cargo (t)	Change	Aircraft movements	Change
2002	1,621,798	Steady	6,827	Steady	28,872	Steady
2003	1,849,148	▲14%	6,532	▼4%	32,484	▲13%
2004	2,045,282	▲11%	8,946	▲37%	36,416	▲12%
2005	2,032,357	▼1%	7,728	▼14%	37,614	▲3%
2006	2,222,445	▲9%	8,200	▲6%	42,360	▲13%
2007	2,512,890	▲13%	7,926	▼3%	43,448	▲3%
2008	2,650,048	▲5%	8,129	▲3%	44,454	▲2%
2009	2,384,077	▼10%	6,690	▼18%	40,664	▼8%
2010	2,698,730	▲13%	7,427	▲11%	44,160	▲9%
2011	3,124,633	▲16%	8,025	▲8%	44,923	▲2%
2012	3,363,919	▲8%	7,253	▼10%	44,990	▲0%
2013	3,543,194	▲5%	7,679	▲6%	46,828	▲4%
2014	4,638,577	▲31%	10,222	▲33%	58,695	▲25%
2015	4,776,110	▲3%	13,091	▲28%	58,506	▲0%
2016	4,924,992	▲3%	13,939	▲7%	58,633	▲0%
2017	5,343,420	▲9%	22,350	▲42%	58,859	▲0%
2018	5,641,105	▲6%	25,543	▲29,3%	67,460	▲3,8%
2019	6,159,000	▲9.2%	N/A	N/A	70,365	▲4,3%
2020	1,904,025	▼69.1%	N/A	N/A	34,452	▼51.2%
2021	3,286,295	▲73%	N/A	N/A	48,842	▲45%
2022	5,611,920	▲71%	N/A	N/A	65,644	▲34%
2023	7,948,202	▲41.5%	N/A	N/A	N/A	N/A
2024	8,367,931	▲5.3%	N/A	N/A	86,121	▲3.4%
2025	8,912,349	▲6.5%	N/A	N/A	89,480	▲3.9%
2026 (1.1.-31.10.)	8,152,781	▲7.1%	N/A	N/A	N/A	N/A

=== Passenger numbers ===
2025
Month	Passengers	Change (2024–2025)	Passengers Cumulatively
January	563,693	▼1.3%	563,693
February	495,532	▲3.2%	1,059,225
March	556,281	▼0.4%	1,615,506
April	682,266	▲10.8%	2,297,772
May	751,591	▲4.8%	3,049,363
June	868,030	▲11.8%	3,917,393
July	974,091	▲6.6%	4,891,484
August	1,003,934	▲7.5%	5,895,418
September	905,016	▲5.5%	6,800,434
October	812,129	▲8.0%	7,612,563
November	651,260	▲9.4%	8,263,823
December	648,526	▲8.6%	8,912,349

2026
Month	Passengers	Change (2025–2026)	Passengers Cumulatively
January	600,348	▲6.5%	600,348
February	543,471	▲9.4%	1,143,819
March	614,291	▲10.4%	1,758,110
April	730,243	▲7.0%	2,488,353
May	816,386	▲8.6%	3,304,739
June	896,289	▲3.3%	4,201,028
July	1,036,685	▲6.4%	5,237,713
August	1,078,299	▲7.4%	6,316,012
September	962,919	▲6.4%	7,278,931
October	873,850	▲7.6%	8,152,781
November			
December			

=== Busiest routes ===
Most frequent routes at Belgrade Nikola Tesla Airport
City	Airport	Weekly Departures (Summer 2026)	Airlines
Tivat	Tivat Airport	64	Air Montenegro, Air Serbia
Istanbul	Istanbul Airport, Istanbul Sabiha Gökçen International Airport	43	Air Serbia, AJet, Pegasus Airlines, Turkish Airlines
Zürich	Zürich Airport	42	Air Serbia, Swiss International Air Lines
Vienna	Vienna Airport	39	Air Serbia, Austrian Airlines
Podgorica	Podgorica Airport	35	Air Montenegro, Air Serbia
Frankfurt	Frankfurt Airport	34	Air Serbia, Lufthansa
Munich	Munich Airport, Memmingen Airport	32	Air Serbia, Lufthansa, Wizz Air
Amsterdam	Amsterdam Airport Schiphol	23	Air Serbia, KLM
Paris	Beauvais–Tillé Airport, Charles de Gaulle Airport	23	Air Serbia, easyJet, Wizz Air
Athens	Athens International Airport	21	Aegean Airlines, Air Serbia
Moscow	Sheremetyevo International Airport	21	Air Serbia
Larnaca	Larnaca International Airport	19	Air Serbia, Wizz Air
Dubai	Dubai Airport	17	Flydubai
Ljubljana	Ljubljana Airport	17	Air Serbia
Milan	Milan Malpensa Airport, Orio al Serio International Airport	16	Air Serbia, Wizz Air
Barcelona	Josep Tarradellas Barcelona–El Prat Airport	15	Air Serbia, Wizz Air
London	Heathrow Airport, Luton Airport	14	Air Serbia, Wizz Air

== Services ==
=== Security ===
Before the 2020/2021–2023 remodelling, Belgrade Nikola Tesla Airport was built with only one airside hallway for both departing and arriving passengers. As such, security checks used to be located at gate entrances rather than on a central location. An additional security check used to exist on the hallway entrance, but it was removed in 2013 as it inconvenienced passengers and was not essential for security. Since 2021, however, there has been a central security hall directly above the ticketing area, before passport control, where all passengers must be screened.

Passport control for departing passengers is located on the first floor in Terminal 2, just before the security screening, while the passport control for arriving passengers is located on the ground level. All passengers must pass the passport control, except those traveling domestically. An additional passport control booth exists in Terminal 1; however, it is no longer available for passengers, only for flight crews. In mid-December 2024 eGates for passport controls were introduced, with 10 eGates in the departures area and 10 eGates in the arrivals area, totalling in 20 eGates.

In 2007 the airport prohibited cars parking next to the airport terminal, instead they have to use the car park provided, as a result of the 2007 Glasgow Airport attack.

=== Lounges ===
Belgrade Nikola Tesla Airport offers a business class lounge operated by Dufry, "Business Club", for the majority of airlines operating from the airport. "Business Club", opened in 2011, covers an area of 250 m^{2} (2,700 sq ft), and can seat 30 guests.

The airport also has a VIP Lounge, with separate check-in and passport control facilities. The VIP Lounge is entered from the public area and directly from the apron, so it functions as a separate and independent element. Passport and customs control and baggage control are located at the very entrance into the lounge.

Air Serbia Premium Lounge is the first dedicated airline-owned and -operated lounge at the airport, located between gates A4 and A5. Air Serbia plans to open a new Premium Lounge next to gate C10 at Belgrade Nikola Tesla Airport by the end of 2024. The new lounge will occupy an area of 630 m^{2} (6,800 sq ft) (twice the size of the existing lounge) and will be able to accommodate up to 160 guests simultaneously.

== Ground transport ==
=== Car ===
The airport is connected to the A3 motorway via a nearby interchange. The toll station on A3 is located to the west of the interchange, and the sections to the Belgrade downtown and the Belgrade bypass are toll-free. Licensed taxis from the airport to the city are available.

=== Bus ===
The following scheduled bus services connect the airport with its surroundings:

Service	Destination (departing from the airport)
Line A1	Slavija Square
Line 72	Zeleni Venac
Line 72N (night line)	Republic Square
Line 600	Belgrade Centre railway station
Line 607	Banovo Brdo
Line 860i	Belgrade Bus Station / Barič

=== Rail ===
In 2018, the Serbian Ministry of Construction, Transportation and Infrastructure announced a construction project for the railway link between the city and the airport with construction of the railway starting in 2024. As of late 2026, the final seven kilometres of the 18.3-kilometre route are under construction with services expected to commence as late as April 2027. Trains are planned to run at a speed of around 120 km/h with frequencies ranging from 15 to 30 minutes.

== Accidents and incidents ==
- On 18 February 2024, Air Serbia Flight 324, an Embraer E-195 wet-leased from Marathon Airlines with 106 passengers and crew on board, sustained serious damage to its fuselage and tail after hitting the airport runway's instrument landing system array during takeoff on its way to Düsseldorf. The aircraft turned back after failing to gain altitude and was safely evacuated upon landing.

== See also ==
- Aviation Museum, Belgrade
- List of airlines of Serbia
- List of airports in Serbia
