= Moste, Ljubljana =

Moste
- Location in Slovenia
- Coordinates: 46°04′07″N 14°32′02″E
- Country: Slovenia
- Traditional region: Upper Carniola
- Statistical region: Central Slovenia
- Municipality: Ljubljana
- Elevation: 287 m (942 ft)

Moste (pronounced [ˈmoːstɛ], Moste) is a former village in the east-central part of Ljubljana, the capital of Slovenia. It is part of the traditional region of Upper Carniola and is now included with the rest of the municipality in the Central Slovenia Statistical Region.

== Name ==
Moste was attested in written sources in 1324 as Prukke (and as dorf ze Pruk in 1330). The name is derived from the Slovene common noun most 'bridge', corresponding to the Bavarian Middle High German root pruk 'bridge' seen in medieval attestations of the name, referring to a settlement with a bridge. Structurally, the name may be based on the old locative form mostě '(at the) bridge' and later reanalyzed as a feminine plural noun.

== History ==
The old village core of Moste stood north of the point where the Gruber Canal currently empties into the Ljubljanica River. It originally consisted of a row of houses below the sloping land (Slovene: ježa) above the river, which is reflected in the old street name Pod ježami (literally, 'below the sloping land') in the Vodmat neighborhood. After the 1895 Ljubljana earthquake, small one-story buildings for laborers and low-ranking civil servants were built in Moste, which is also reflected in the street layout. In the 20th century, the part of Moste south of the railroad largely retained its rural character, whereas the part north of the railroad was industrialized. A factory for processing bauxite was built in 1906. Other prewar industries included Saturnus (founded in 1912), which made metal containers, and a tar distillation plant. Moste was annexed by the City of Ljubljana in 1935, ending its existence as an independent settlement. After the Second World War, Moste was further industrialized; rail freight services and warehouses were built in Moste, and the relocation of the airport from Polje to Zgornji Brnik further increased opportunities for industrial development.
