= Inex-Adria Aviopromet Flight 1308 =

1981 aviation accident in France

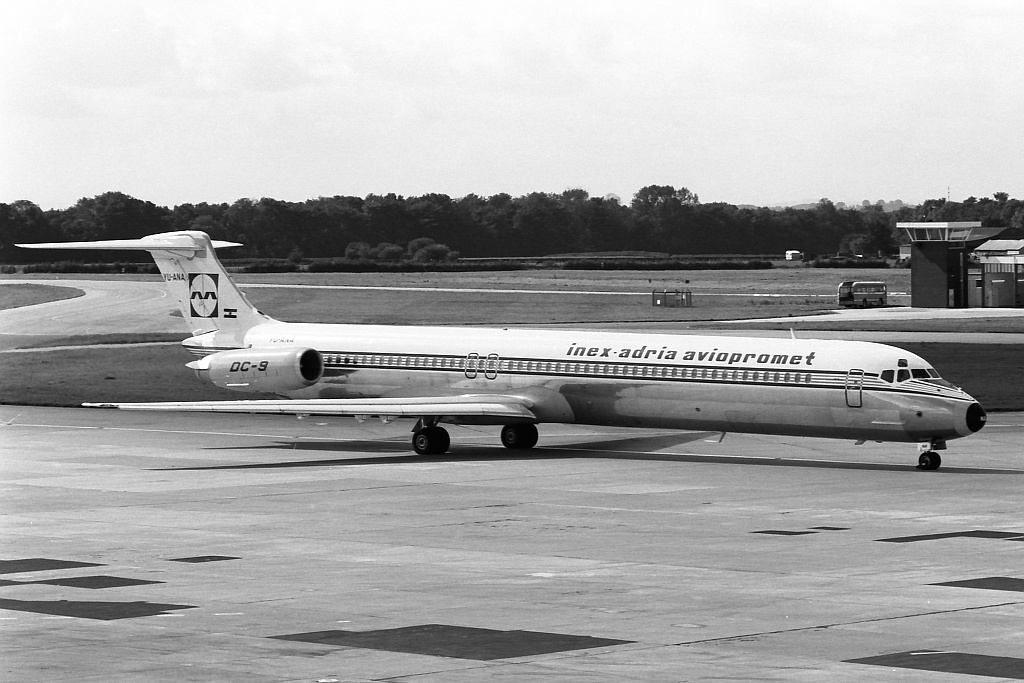
- YU-ANA, the aircraft involved in the accident, seen in September 1981

Accident
- Date: 1 December 1981
- Summary: Controlled flight into terrain on approach
- Site: Mont San-Pietro, near Ajaccio - Campo dell'Oro Airport, Ajaccio, Corsica, France; 41°45′15″N 8°58′40″E

Aircraft
- Aircraft type: McDonnell Douglas MD-82
- Operator: Inex-Adria Aviopromet
- IATA flight No.: JP1308
- ICAO flight No.: ADR1308
- Call sign: ADRIA 1308
- Registration: YU-ANA
- Flight origin: Brnik Airport, Ljubljana, Yugoslavia (Present-day, Ljubljana, Slovenia)
- Destination: Ajaccio - Campo dell'Oro Airport, Ajaccio, Corsica, France
- Occupants: 180
- Passengers: 173
- Crew: 7
- Fatalities: 180
- Survivors: 0

Inex-Adria Aviopromet Flight 1308 was a charter flight, operated with a McDonnell Douglas MD-82, which brought Yugoslav tourists to Corsica. On 1 December 1981, on its final approach, the plane crashed into Mont San Petru; all of the 180 passengers and crew died. The crash is the first, and the deadliest, major aviation accident involving an MD-80 model aircraft.

== Background ==
Kompas, a travel agency based in Ljubljana, chartered a tourist flight to Ajaccio through Inex-Adria Aviopromet. On 22 October 1981, a request was sent by Inex-Adria to the General Directorate of Civil Aviation to authorize a charter flight, from Ljubljana to Ajaccio and back, on 1 December. On 16 November, the request was approved, with the flight being numbered JP-1308. Though Inex-Adria stated its intention to use a McDonnell Douglas DC-9, they instead flew an MD-82, as it was a newer and larger aircraft. Additionally, 43 more passengers were boarded than applied for, including Inex-Adria employees, Kompas tourists, and/or their families. There were seven crew members, meaning that there were 180 people on the flight.

=== Aircraft and crew ===
The aircraft was a McDonnell Douglas MD-82 powered by two Pratt & Whitney JT8D-217 turbofan engines (numbers P708403D and P708404D), each developing 20,850 pounds of thrust. It first flew on 15 May 1981, was delivered to Inex-Adria on 11 August, and was registered in Yugoslavia as YU-ANA (manufacturer's serial number 48047). As a consequence of the flight taking place so soon after delivery, the aircraft only had 683 flying hours.

The captain was 55-year-old Ivan Kunović. He received his pilot license for jet aircraft on 16 April 1968 at the Yugoslav Academy of the Air Force in Zadar and was qualified to fly the F-84, T-33, and F-86. Kunović reached the rank of Captain in the Yugoslav Air Force soon after which he was hired by Inex-Adria in 1970 and became a first officer on the DC-9 the same year. He then became a captain of the DC-9 (32 and 50 series) on 4 April 1972 and then an MD-80 captain on 13 August 1981 after 3 months of training in the United States. At the time of the accident, Kunović had a total of 12,123 flight hours, including 5,675 hours on the DC-9 and 188 hours on the MD-82.

The co-pilot was 40-year-old Franc Terglav. He was initially qualified to pilot flights in the Yugoslav Air Force school for reserve pilots (ŠRVO 14 kl.in 1962) He was flying on the Aero 3, Soko 522 and later the civilian Piper PA-31, PA-34, and Cessna Citation. He was a pilot for the Slovenian company Gorenje. Soon after he became a pilot for Inex-Adria and started flying the DC-9 (32 and 50 series) On 21 June 1981, he graduated to first officer on the MD-82 and he received his commercial pilots license on 11 November 1981. Terglav had a total of 4,213 flight hours, with 746 of them on the DC-9 (which were accumulated during 529 flights), and 288 hours on the MD-82.

== Accident ==
Flight JP 1308 took off from Ljubljana Airport (then Brnik Airport) at 06:41, on a chartered flight from Slovenia (at the time Yugoslavia) to Corsica's capital city of Ajaccio with 173 Slovenian passengers and 7 crew members. At 07:08, with the aircraft in Italian airspace, the controller in Padua contacted a colleague in Ajaccio, and requested an actual weather report. A moderate wind 10 knots (19 km/h; 12 mph) was blowing from the southwest (240°), and the sky was covered with separate clouds. When the flight crew learned of this, they decided to land on runway 03, while Kunović clarified that if the wind increased, they would fly around for inspection. At 07:28, the plane entered the zone of the control center in Rome, and the flight was cleared to descend to flight level (FL) FL270 (27,000 ft; 8,200 m). The flight crew asked whether or not they were cleared to descend. The controller told the crew that they were not cleared, and the crew acknowledged the transmission, thanking the controller.

At 07:31, the controller again cleared flight 1308 to descend to FL270, which the crew acknowledged, reporting that they were leaving FL330 (33,000 ft; 10,000 m) and beginning to descend. The controller also clarified that the flight would be cleared to descend to FL190 (19,000 ft; 5,800 m) after passing Elbe. The Cockpit Voice Recorder (CVR) recorded a sound similar to the activation of the "Fasten seat belt" sign; Kunović instructed Terglav to calculate the landing parameters. A flight attendant entered the cockpit and asked to reduce the temperature in the cabin, which the first officer did. At 07:33, the controller cleared Flight 1308 to descend to FL190 at Bastia. After reviewing the calculations, the flight crew determined the approach speeds as 221, 170, 148 and 124 knots (409, 315, 274 and 230 km/h; 254, 196, 170 and 143 mph). At some point, Terglav let his son enter the cockpit, as a child's voice was heard asking when the aircraft would descend.

At 07:35, the aircraft entered the air traffic control space in Marseille. At 07:35:50, the flight crew contacted control to report their descent to FL210, and that they planned to descend to FL190 in the direction of Ajaccio. Permission was requested for a further reduction. In response, the flight crew was instructed to maintain FL190 (19,000 ft; 5,800 m) to Bastia, bypassing closed airspace, and to "squawk" 5200 on the aircraft's transponder. At 07:40:35, the flight crew reported that they were 50 mi (80 km) from Ajaccio, and remained at FL 190. They again requested permission to descend, being cleared to descend to FL110 (11,000 ft; 3,400 m). Non-standard terminology—"cleared down 110"—was used, prompting discussion amongst the crew.

The flight crew reviewed the approach procedure for the Instrument Landing System (ILS) on runway 03. In this process, Terglav's son was heard twice, speaking about observing a mountain similar to Servin; according to the investigation, it was of the Monte Cinto array. Focusing on the elevation of the airport, 52 ft (16 m), the crew set the decision height to 643 ft (196 m).

At 07:43:57, Kunović reported being 28 mi (24 nmi; 45 km) on VOR Ajaccio, and being at FL110. At 07:47:10, he contacted the Ajaccio approach controller for the first time, saying, "Bonjour, Ajaccio, Adria JP 1308. We're level 110, approaching Ajaccio VOR, and further descent." The approach controller told the flight crew they would be landing on runway 21, instructed them to keep on the VOR Ajaccio, and informed them of the weather: atmospheric pressure (QNH) 1009, airfield pressure (QFE) 1008, wind 280° at 20 knots (37 km/h; 23 mph).

At 07:49:31, the flight crew told the approach controller, "Just now, Ajaccio VOR, level is 110, in holding pattern." At 07:49:36, the approach controller responded, "Report leaving Alpha Juliet Oscar on radial 247 for final approach". At 07:49:04, Kunović said, "Okay, sir. We're just over Ajaccio VOR, and we're requesting further descent." The approach controller appeared to believe that the flight crew would skip the holding pattern and proceed to a direct approach on radial 247 from AJO VOR, as done by many pilots making the same approach, while Kunović, who had never flown to Ajaccio, entered a holding pattern over AJO VOR. The Jeppesen map showed a holding pattern with an airspeed of 150 knots (280 km/h; 170 mph), while the aircraft's IAS was around 230–250 knots (430–460 km/h; 260–290 mph), which dramatically increased the radius of the holding pattern.

Believing that the aircraft was flying on radial 247 outbound from AJO VOR, at 07:49:52, the approach controller approved a descent to 3,000 ft, QNH 1009, on the radial 247. QNH 1009 was a redundant piece of information which increased the mental load of the crew. A more critical issue was that the aircraft was not on radial 247 out from AJO VOR, as the approach controller believed, but in AJO VOR holding pattern with minimum holding altitude (MHA) of 6,800 ft (2,100 m). By approving a descent to 3,000 ft (910 m) the approach controller precipitated the crash. The flight crew contributed by failing to understand that they were not on AJO VOR radial 247, and that their holding pattern's MHA was 6,800 ft.

At 07:50:05, Kunović responded, "Roger, will do, and we're leaving 11 for 3000, radial 247 out of one one zero QNH, repeat again, one zero zero nine." This created further confusion, as he used the vague term radial 247, reinforcing the approach controller's belief that the flight crew were skipping the holding pattern, and gave the wrong QNH. At 07:50:19, he told the approach controller, "We're in holding over Ajaccio. Call you inbound on radial 247." At 07:50:28, the approach controller responded with a simple, "Roger," not realizing that the flight crew weren't following instructions. At 07:52:15, Kunović radioed, "We're rolling inbound, out of 6000." and the approach controller responded with, "Roger, 1308. Report turning inbound." Kunović meant that the plane was turning left in the holding pattern towards AJO VOR, but the approach controller thought he meant that the aircraft was turning towards the airport over the sea.

The last transmission from JP 1308 was received at 07:52:25, when Kunović reported, "Turning inbound to Ajaccio because at the moment, we're in cloud." At 07:52:30, the approach controller, still believing that JP 1308 was turning inbound to Ajaccio Airport and entering its final approach, responded "Roger 1308, report Charlie Tango on final, surface wind 280°/20kts." From 07:52:43, turbulent flows were recorded on the FDR, as the aircraft was flying above mountain peaks of 1,000–2,500 ft (300–760 m). The flight crew were surprised by the mention of CT NDB by the approach controller.

At 07:53:08, an alarm was triggered by the aircraft's ground proximity warning system. Surprised, the flight crew did not execute evasive manoeuvres until 07:53:17. At 07:53:20, the left wing struck a barren surface near the top of Mont San-Pietro, shearing off 8.5 m (28 ft). Transmitting four seconds of whistling to the approach controller, the aircraft rolled upside down, entered an uncontrolled dive, and crashed into the gorge on the other side of the mountain, killing everyone aboard. The time of the accident was 7:53 a.m. (07:53 UTC).

== Search ==
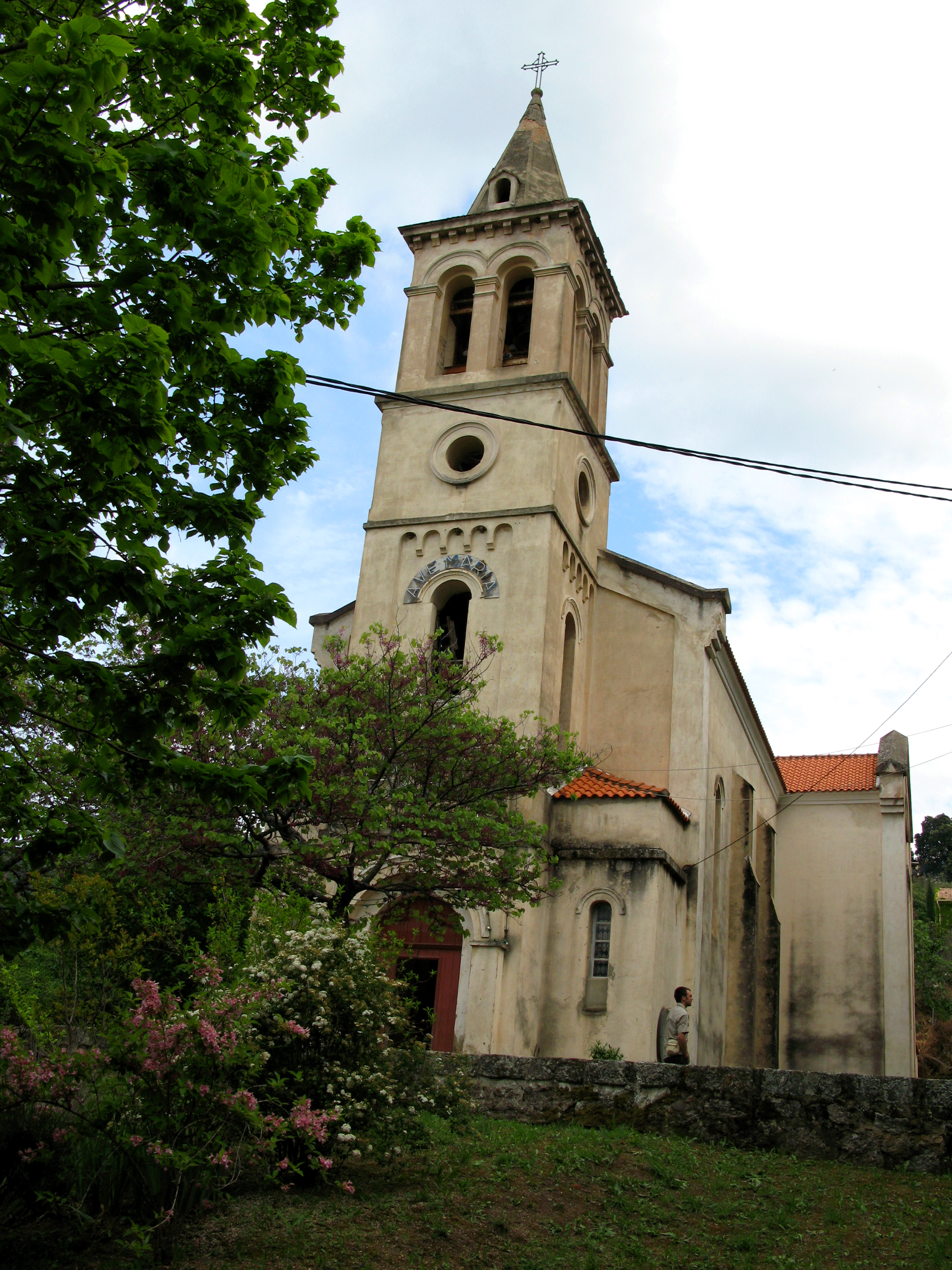
Petreto-Bicchisano church, where the body identification took place

Unable to contact the flight crew, ATC at Ajaccio Airport contacted emergency services. It was initially believed, based on the ATC's assumption about the aircraft's location, that the flight had crashed into the sea; at 12:40 p.m., a wing fragment was found on the summit of Mount San Pietro. The next day the rescuers reached the crash site, only to find that there were no survivors.

== Investigation ==
The subsequent investigation into the disaster revealed that control mistakenly believed that Flight 1308 was out of its holding pattern, believing it was already located over the sea, while in reality it was located 15 km (9.3 mi; 8.1 nmi) inland, over the mountainous terrain of Corsica. The crew, apparently surprised at the instruction to descend, repeated several times that they were still in the holding pattern, which the control acknowledged. The crew was unfamiliar with the airport and its vicinity, as this was the first flight of Inex-Adria Aviopromet to Corsica. The investigation determined that the imprecise language used by the crew of the MD-82 and the air traffic controller played a significant role in the accident. Air traffic control in Ajaccio was cleared of all charges. The air traffic controller in charge of Flight 1308 was transferred to another airport in France.

At the time of the accident, the Ajaccio airport had no radar system. As a direct result of the accident, the equipment was upgraded and the approach pattern changed.

== 2008 clean-up operation ==
Some debris and human bodies were removed from the crash site after the accident in 1981. In 2007, POP TV (a TV station in Slovenia) did a news report on the accident. They visited the crash site in Corsica and found many of the airplane's parts still scattered on Mont San-Pietro, in rugged and inaccessible terrain. Subsequently, the Government of Slovenia, Adria Airways and Kompas (the Slovenian travel agency that organized the fatal trip in 1981) organized and funded a clean-up operation. A Slovenian team of about 60 soldiers, mountain rescuers, civil protection and rescue service members, medical personnel, and other volunteers removed about 27 tons of aircraft remains in May 2008. The removed debris included one aircraft engine and large wing parts. Some of the parts were so large they needed to be machine cut before transporting them from the mountain by a helicopter. Several human remains were also found, and were either sent for further identification tests, or were properly disposed of. A commemorative plaque was installed at the site of the initial wing impact.
