= Norbert Werner =

Austrian free-lance journalist and war correspondent

Ljubljana Jože Pučnik Airport is located in Ljubljana, Slovenia.

Norbert Werner (born in Laxenburg, died on 28 June 1991 in Brnik) was an Austrian freelance journalist and war correspondent.

Werner died at the age of 23 together with Nikolas Vogel at Ljubljana Airport on 28 June 1991, in a missile attack by the Yugoslav People's Army on their car.

Werner and Vogel were the first two journalists killed during the ten-day Slovenian Independence War. They were commemorated by prime minister Janez Janša during the festivities of the final accession of Slovenia to the Schengen agreement of the European Union at the airport of Ljubljana in 2008.
