= Moste =

Moste may refer to a number of settlements in Slovenia:

- Moste, Ljubljana, a neighborhood of Ljubljana
- Moste, Žirovnica, a village in the Municipality of Žirovnica
- Moste, Komenda, a settlement in the Municipality of Komenda
