= Nikolas Vogel =

Austrian-German film actor

- Born: 9 March 1967; Vienna, Austria
- Died: 28 June 1991 (aged 24); Jože Pučnik Airport, Ljubljana, Slovenia
- Cause of death: Missile strike, Yugoslav Federal Army
- Resting place: Austria
- Other name: Nik
- Occupations: Actor and news camera operator
- Years active: 10 years
- Known for: Acting
- Notable work: The Inheritors (1984)
- Parent(s): Peter Vogel and Gertraud Jesserer
- Relatives: Michael Vogel (brother), Rudolf Vogel (grandfather)

Nikolas Vogel (9 March 1967 – 28 June 1991) was an Austrian-German film actor and news camera operator. Vogel belonged to a family of famous actors and he also became an actor. Vogel left the acting profession to report the news and worked for a short time as journalist before he was killed in the Ten-Day War as Yugoslavia was dividing in the aftermath of Marshall Josip Broz Tito's death. Vogel was killed in a missile incident along with Austrian colleague Norbert Werner.

== Personal ==
Nikolas Vogel was born on 9 March 1967 in Vienna, Austria. He was born into an acting family. His mother, Gertraud Jesserer, was a well known Austrian theater, cinema and television actress. She appeared in theater performances at the Deutsches Schauspielhaus in Hamburg, Burgtheater in Vienna, and the Munich Kammerspiele among others. She had a starring role and appeared in the Austrian, German-language TV show Familie Leitner.

His father Peter Vogel was a well known German actor, whose career included a role in the 1978 US TV Miniseries Holocaust. His grandfather was Rudolf Vogel and also a famous and successful actor. His grandfather was acting at the Landesbühne in Munich, Staatstheater and the Munich Kammerspiele. He did several film productions as well. Nikolas had a younger brother Michael.

== Film career ==
Nikolas Vogel acted in movies and TV shows before becoming a journalist. Acting in teenage roles, Vogel had a starring role in The Inheritors (1984). His character, Thomas Feigl, is a young boy who joins a neo-Nazi group.

Vogel's apparent maturity was reflected in his onscreen portrayals. In his early roles, he was often sexualized and shown naked. In The Inheritors, he has a frontal nude scene.

- Was Kostet Der Sieg? (1981)
- The Inheritors (1983)
- Herzklopfen (1985)
- Bibos Maenner (1986)
- O zivej vode (TV movie, 1988)
- Eurocops (TV series, 1989 episode)
- Requim for Dominic (1991)

== Journalism career ==
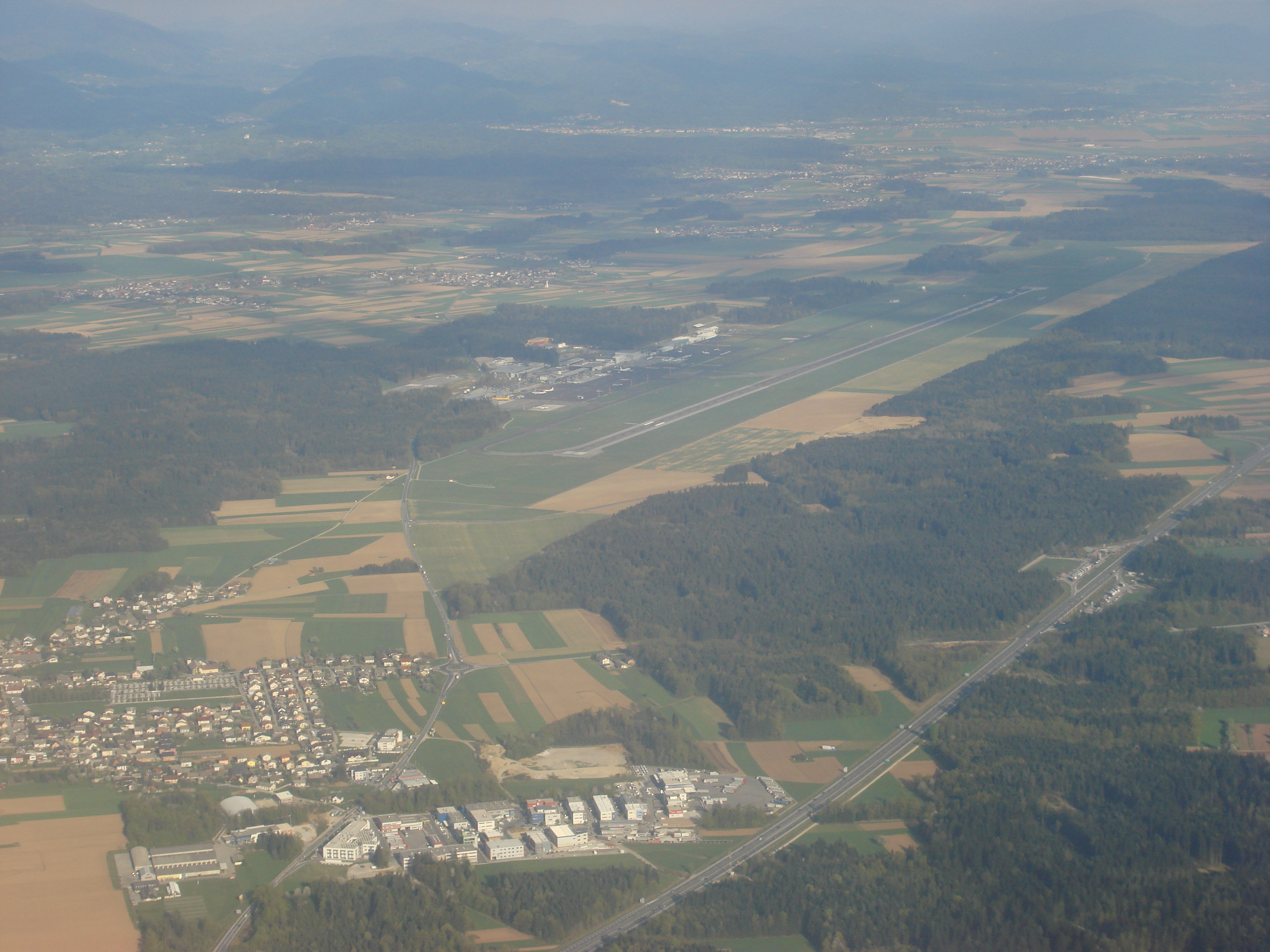
Aerial shot taken of the Ljubljana Jože Pučnik Airport.

=== Death ===
Ljubljana Jože Pučnik Airport is located in Ljubljana, Slovenia.

Vogel was working as a freelance photojournalist when he was killed along with colleague Norbert Werner on 28 June 1991 at the Ljubljana Airport, Slovenia. They were both killed by a missile that struck their car during a Yugoslav Federal Army attack on the airport during Ten-Day War after Slovenia declared independence.

== Memorial ==
Slovenia celebrated its entry into the Schengen Treaty with other European countries at the site where Vogel and Werner were killed. The two journalists were acknowledged at the celebration.

== See also ==
- Ten-Day War#28 June 1991 & Ten-Day War#Casualties
- Ljubljana Jože Pučnik Airport
- List of Austrian films of the 1980s
- List of journalists killed in Europe

== Bibliography ==
- Holmstrom, John. The Moving Picture Boy: An International Encyclopaedia from 1895 to 1995. Norwich, UK: Michael Russell, 1996, pg. 367.
