= Adria Airways =

National airline of Slovenia (1961–2019)

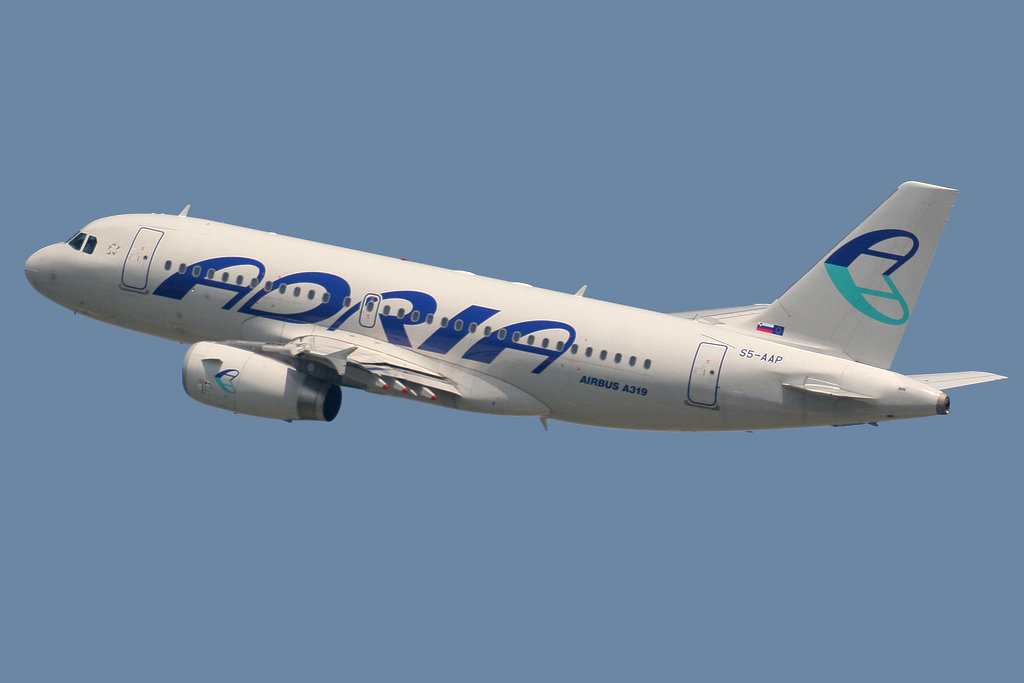
IATA	ICAO	Call sign
JP	ADR	ADRIA
- Founded: 14 March 1961
- Commenced operations: December 1961; 64 years ago
- Ceased operations: 30 September 2019; 7 years ago
- Hubs: Ljubljana
- Focus cities: Pristina; Tirana
- Frequent-flyer program: Miles & More
- Alliance: Star Alliance (2004–2019)
- Subsidiaries: Darwin Airline (Jul 2017–Dec 2017)
- Headquarters: Zgornji Brnik, Cerklje na Gorenjskem, Slovenia

Adria Airways d.o.o. (formerly Inex-Adria Aviopromet and later Inex-Adria Airways) was the flag carrier of Slovenia, operating scheduled and charter services to European destinations. The company's head office was at Ljubljana Jože Pučnik International Airport in Zgornji Brnik, Cerklje na Gorenjskem, near Ljubljana. On 30 September 2019, the airline declared bankruptcy, ceasing all operations. Since Adria's collapse, Slovenia has not had a flag carrier.

== History ==
=== Early years ===
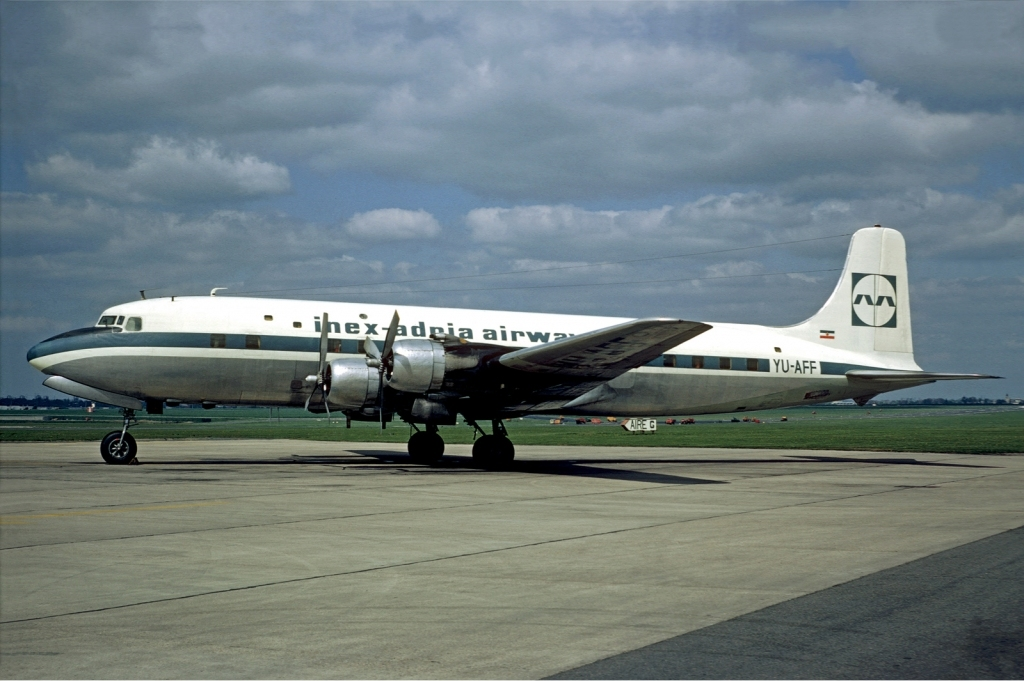
Inex-Adria Douglas DC-6B at Le Bourget Airport (1971).

The airline was founded in March 1961 as Adria Aviopromet (Adria Airways). In August, the company purchased two DC-6B from KLM and flew their first commercial flight with a Dutch crew. At the same time, the first Adria crew and technical teams were trained by JAT Yugoslav Airlines and the air force. Adria carried out its first flight with a domestic crew in December 1961. At the same time all other activities necessary for the company were set up and organised, from the commercial to the accounting department.

During the following years, Adria gradually acquired a market with tourist flights from Germany, the United Kingdom, the Netherlands, and Scandinavia to airports on the Adriatic coast. In 1964, flights to the United States and Canada were added in order to meet the needs of expatriate organisations. Adria also carried out a considerable number of flights for the United Nations.

With the opening of the new airport in Ljubljana in 1964, Adria relocated its base from its previous headquarters in Zagreb.

The DC-6B aircraft gradually became non-competitive on the market. The company fell into a serious crisis in 1967, which ended with a bankruptcy procedure at 1968. After a compulsory settlement, Adria continued its operations largely thanks to the efforts of the president of the Slovenian Chamber of the Commerce and Industry of the time.

In December 1968, Adria merged with the Serbian company InterExport based in Belgrade and changed its name from Adria Aviopromet to Inex-Adria Aviopromet (Inex-Adria Airways). The fleet renewal began.

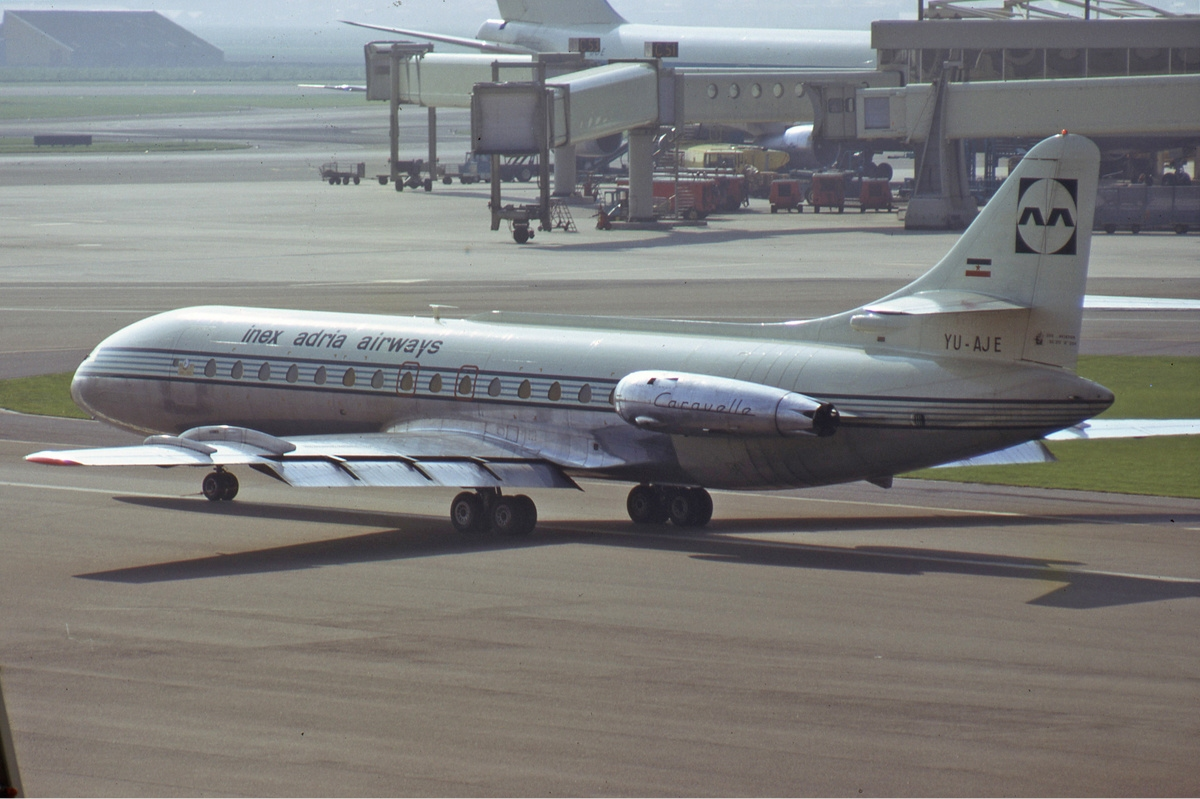
Inex-Adria Caravelle in 1972

=== 1970s ===
In 1969, the first jet aircraft was purchased, a McDonnell Douglas DC-9-30 with 115 seats. Thus began a period of modernisation of the fleet, which allowed Adria to increase its share on the tourist flights market. In September 1969 the first scheduled service was established on the Ljubljana-Belgrade route. In March 1970, Adria had four Douglas DC-6B and a Douglas DC-9-30 with one more on order.

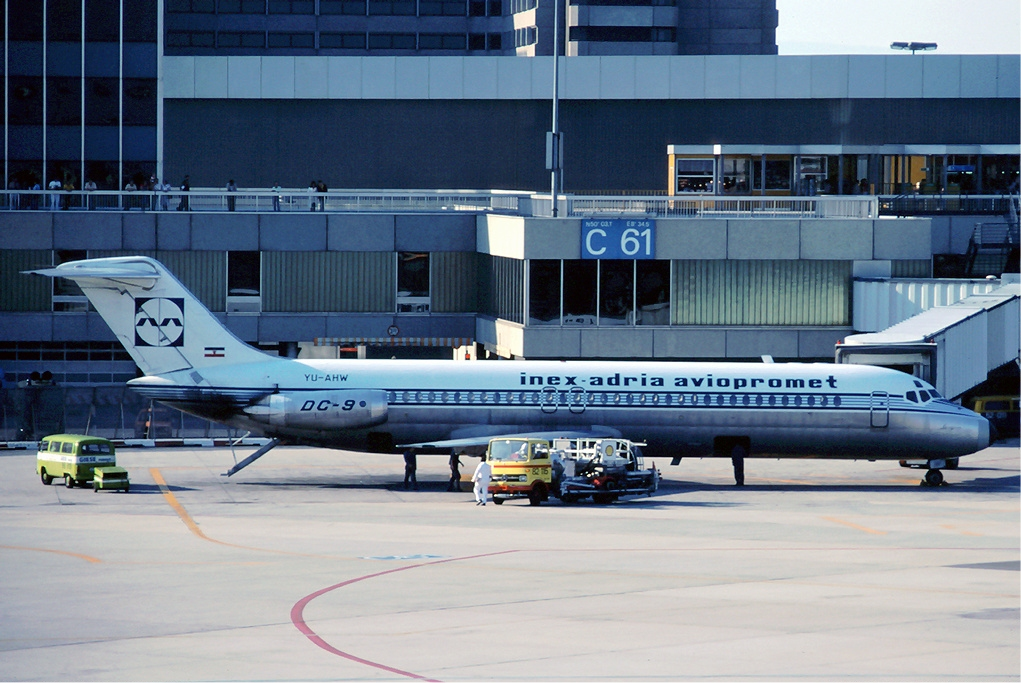
Inex-Adria Douglas DC-9-33 at Frankfurt Airport in 1976

Business saw a considerable increase. Adria, in addition to expanding the number of its own aircraft, occasionally also leased aircraft (Sud Aviation Caravelle, Douglas DC-8, BAC One-Eleven).

In 1972, Adria renewed its transatlantic flights to the United States and Canada with Douglas DC-8-55 aircraft. However, it withdrew from that service next year.

In the late 1970s, Adria was awarded as most punctual carrier on the charter flight market. The greatest commercial successes of that period were achieved on the German market which was also the largest at that time, in a productive partnership with Grimex Company. The number of flights to Great Britain, France, Spain and Scandinavia also increased. During that period, Adria also introduced flights within Yugoslavia.

The company paid a great deal of attention to education. It founded a professional education centre and assisted in setting up an aviation course at the engineering faculty in Ljubljana. Special emphasis was given to the development of safety awareness, as three accidents occurred during the last decade.

=== 1980s ===
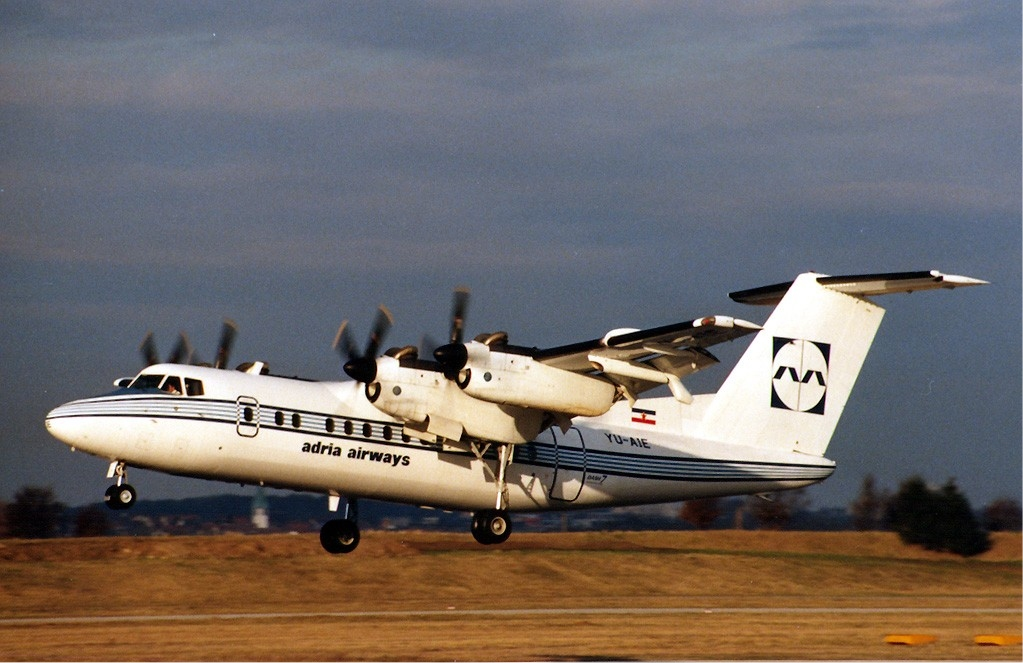
Adria DHC-7 at Stuttgart Airport in 1989

Inex-Adria Aviopromet (Inex-Adria Airways) entered the 1980s as a respectable company with confirmed success on the tourist market and scheduled internal flights. In May 1981, Adria purchased three new McDonnell Douglas MD-80 aircraft. Unfortunately, one of them crashed into a mountain in Corsica in December, killing all aboard.

In 1982, Adria got a new leadership which focused on the education of the flight crews, technical staff and other professional personnel as well as on ensuring safety.

In that period, the business remained focused on charter flights to the Adriatic. Flights for guest workers in Germany and Switzerland, which were connected to internal flights, became an important part of the business. At the end of 1984, the first scheduled international flights were also established on the Ljubljana–Belgrade–Larnaca route.

Prospects for the development of air traffic were very good, so in 1984, Adria signed a contract for the purchase of five Airbus A320 aircraft. Also two new Dash 7 aircraft were bought for the 1984 Winter Olympics in Sarajevo.

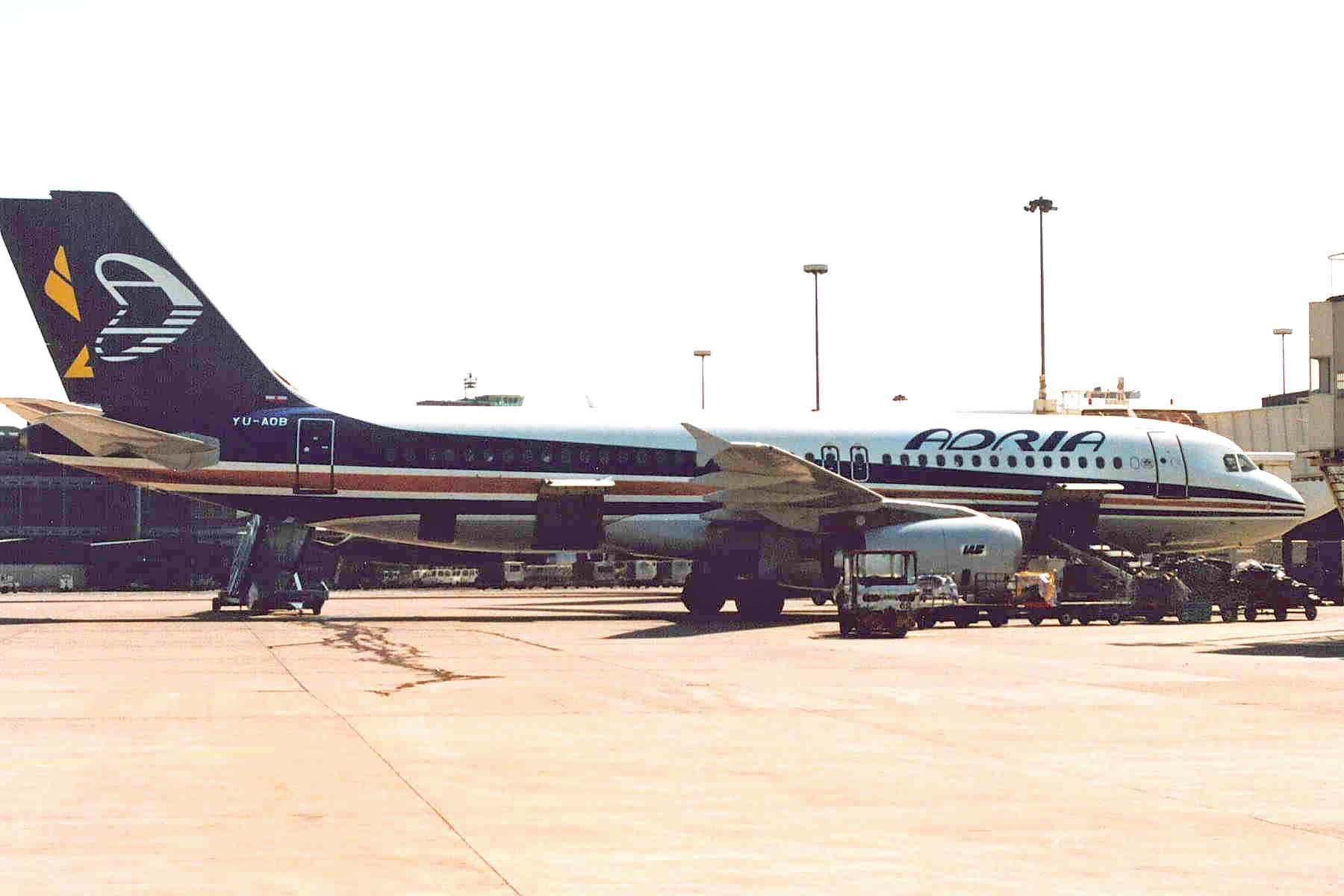
Adria Airbus A320-231 at Manchester Airport in 1990

In December 1985, Adria had four McDonnell Douglas DC-9-30, two McDonnell Douglas DC-9-50, one McDonnell Douglas MD-81, three McDonnell Douglas MD-82 and two de Havilland Canada Dash 7 aircraft. A year later another MD-82 joined the fleet.

Due to a commercial law restructuring programme, in 1986, Adria left the Inex group, becoming an independent company and changing its name to Adria Airways. Later, Adria became a member of IATA.

In 1989, the first new Airbus A320 arrived. It was 43rd A320 made by the Airbus and the first one to be powered by the new IAE Engines.

=== 1990s ===
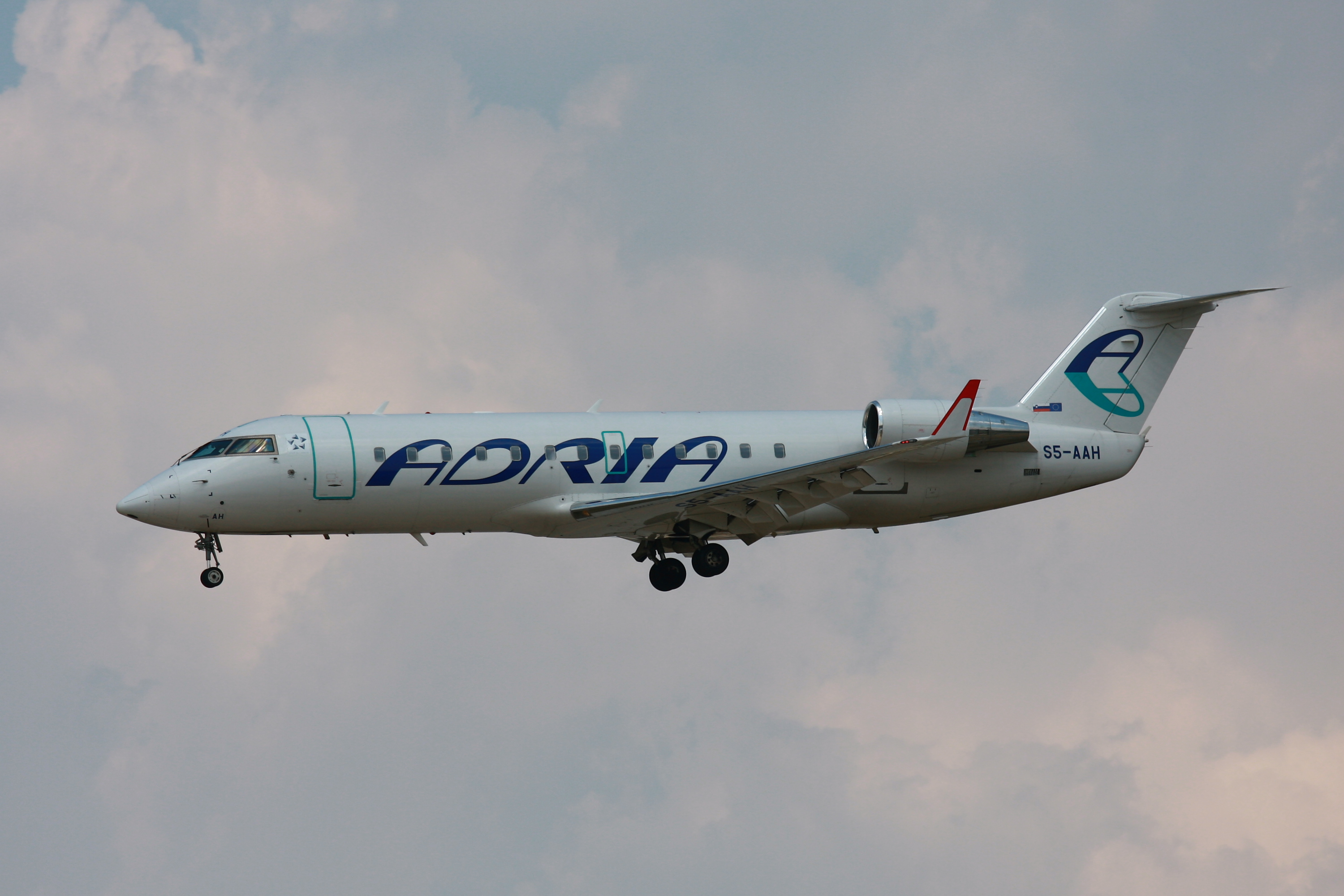
Adria Airways Bombardier CRJ100LR (2010)

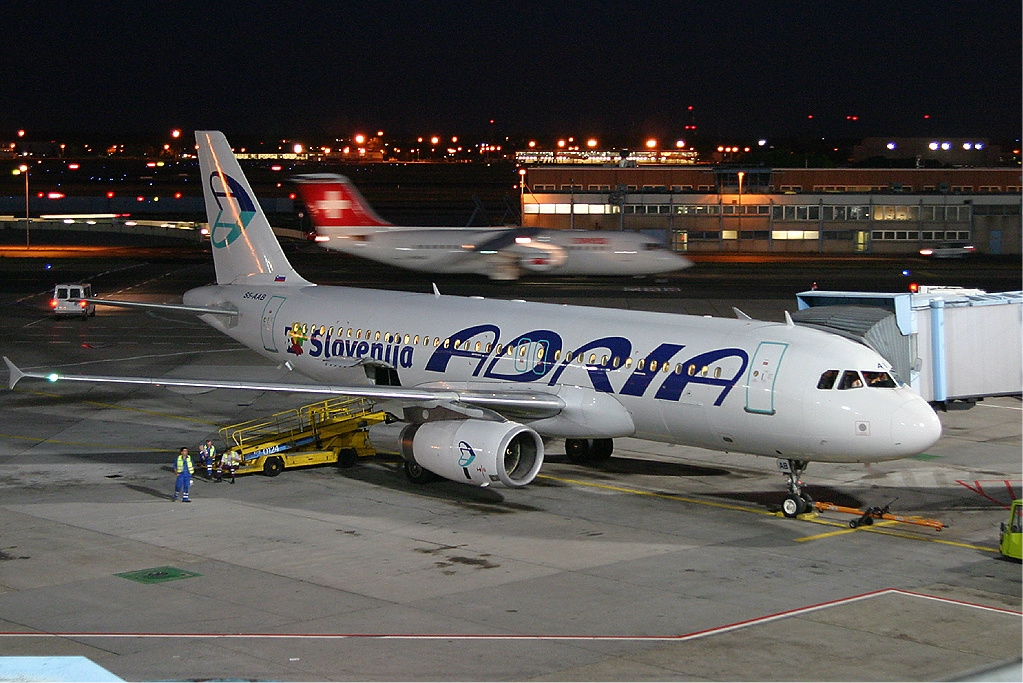
Adria Airways Airbus A320-231 at Frankfurt Airport (2003)

As Yugoslavia began to break up, the tourist industry on the Adriatic slumped, which was also felt by air carriers.

In 1991, Adria had 13 aircraft: three Airbus A320s (two were delivered in September 1990), four MD-82s, one MD-81, three DC-9-30s and two Dash 7s. Two A320s, expected to arrive in June 1991, were sold to other airlines.

Flights began in 1992, when Adria Airways re-established its activities on a truncated market. The majority of charter destinations from Western Europe to the Adriatic coast had become inaccessible as they were now situated on the territory of other countries. The fleet was too big, so many aircraft were leased out across the globe.

Adria Airways became Slovenia's national air carrier and its operational structure changed. From being largely a charter airline it transformed itself into a scheduled operator. Adria began to set up a network of scheduled flights around Europe to serve the needs of an independent Slovenia. Later in 1992, the company joined the Amadeus global travel distribution system. A period of restructuring and rehabilitation of the company began.

In the next years, Adria's A320s were mainly leased out, as well as MD-82s. An MD-81 and an MD-82 were sold in 1994. The other three MD-82 and a DC-9-30 were sold at the end of 1995. As part of an ownership restructuring, in February 1996, the Government of Slovenia obtained a 100% share in the company.

In 1996, in line with the administration's rescue programme, a rehabilitation procedure was started the aim of which was to enable the company to run on market principles. The main emphasis was on the rationalization and modernization of the operations and the adaptation of the fleet to market requirements. The number of employees has been reduced from 931 to 618. In 1996, the fleet consisted of three Airbus A320 with 168 seats (at least two were leased out most of the time), two DC-9-30 with 105 seats and two Dash-7 with 46 seats. Adria started a corporation with Lufthansa later in 1996.

In April 1997, Adria ordered two new Bombardier CRJ200LR planes with an option for one more. Planes were delivered in 1998 when two Dash-7 and two DC-9-30 left the fleet. Another CRJ200LR arrived in late 1998. Bombardier CRJ200LR were chosen as the best option for flights operated from Ljubljana, which allowed for more flights to be flown directly and more frequent. CRJ200LR are in 48 seats configuration which give space for a larger baggage compartment needed for charters. In 1999, Adria's fleet consisted of three Airbus A320, which were now operating back home, and three CRJ200LR.

In the late 1990s and early 2000s, the airline head office was in Ljubljana.

=== 2000s ===
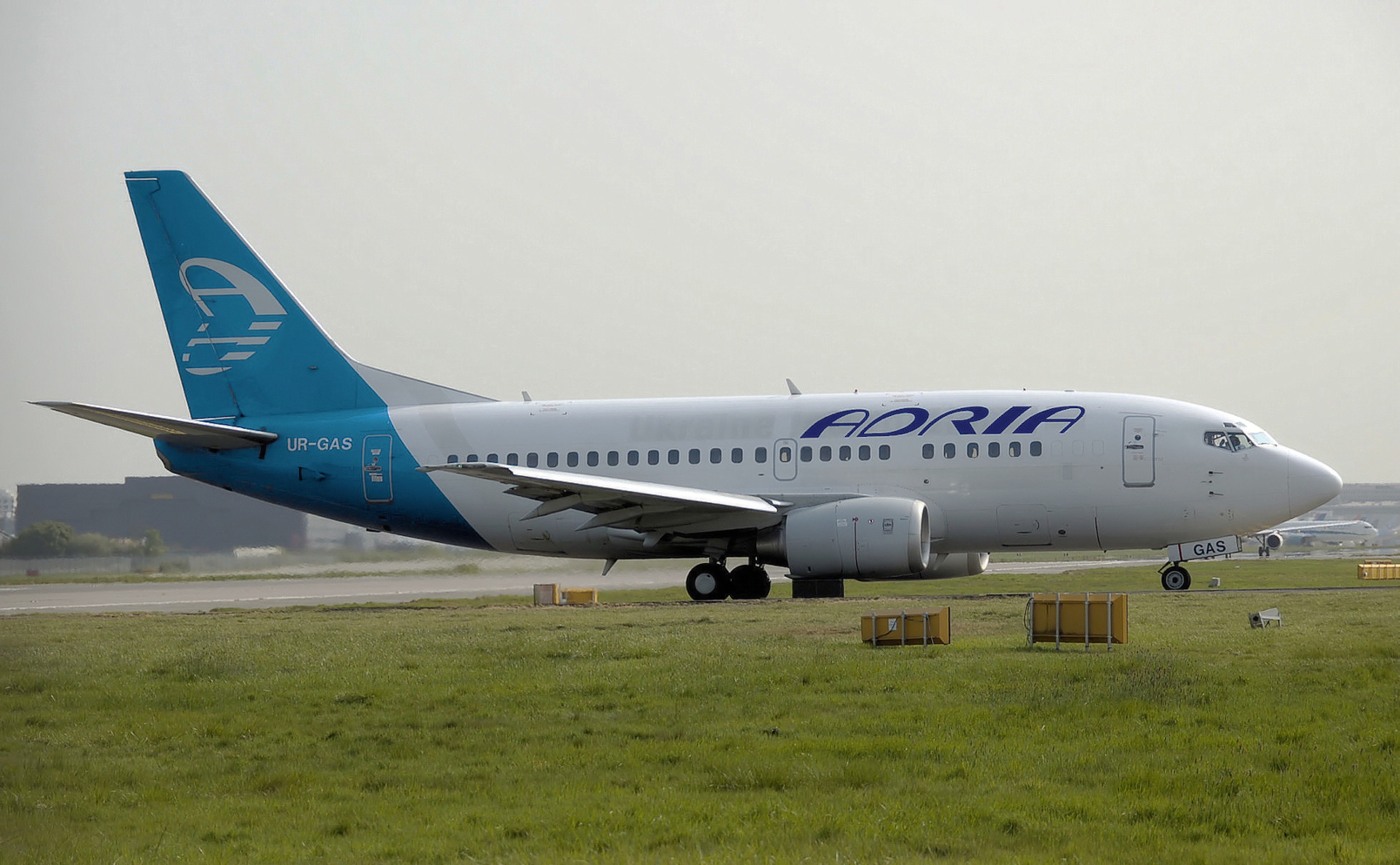
Adria Airways leased Boeing 737-500 at London Gatwick Airport (2007)

Adria started to connect Balkan cities with Western Europe via its hub Ljubljana in the late 1990s. Cities like Sarajevo, Skopje, Ohrid, Tirana were connected with Scandinavia, United Kingdom, Germany and France. After the Kosovo War ended in 1999, Adria was the first airline fly to Pristina in the winter period of 1999. In March 2000, the 4th new 48 seats Bombardier CRJ200LR arrived.

Maribor, the second largest city in Slovenia was connected with Munich for a short period of time in the summer of 2000. There were 5 weekly flights around noon.

In 2001, Adria Airways recorded a large decrease in the number of annual passengers as a result of the September 11, 2001 attacks. In the winter of 2001, Adria started flying in the EU market, starting with the Vienna-Frankfurt route. In July 2002, Bombardier Aerospace selected Adria as the first authorized heavy maintenance facility for CRJ aircraft in Europe.

In the spring of 2003, Adria leased a Bombardier CRJ100LR with 50 seats from Bombardier; the lease lasted until January 2011. In August 2004, Adria was among the first airlines in the world to obtain an IOSA certificate. The 6th Bombardier CRJ200LR with 50 seats was leased from GECAS. On 18 November 2004, Adria Airways joined the Star Alliance.

In 2005, 7th brand new CRJ200LR with 50 seats was delivered to Adria. Adria ended with a loss of around €10 million and a new CEO was announced later in 2005. Tadej Tufek became the new CEO in 2006. Two Boeing 737-500 (112 seats) aircraft were leased from Ukraine International Airlines and Cirrus Airlines to fill the gap between the A320 (162 seats) and CRJ200 (48/50 seats). An A320 was leased to Afriqiyah Airways until late 2009 while another joined Afriqiyah in the winter of 2006 until the summer of 2008. In 2006, the company recorded a minimal profit and transported its first annual millionth passenger since the late 1980s.

In 2007, Adria ordered two Bombardier CRJ900 which were delivered in May. During the summer the fleet consisted of an Airbus A320 (162 seats), a Boeing 737-500 (112 seats) leased from Ukraine International Airlines, two Bombardier CRJ900LR (86 seats) and seven Bombardier CRJ200LR (48/50 seats) aircraft. In November 2007 Adria announced the purchase a new CRJ1000 NextGen and two new CRJ900 NextGen aircraft. Adria ended the year with a small profit.

In 2008, Adria converted its CRJ1000 NextGen order into a 5th CRJ900 and made a loss of €3 million again.

In March 2009, Adria Airways signed a letter of intent with Airbus to purchase a new Airbus A319 aircraft, in order to replace the Airbus A320 fleet. The seating configuration of the aircraft chosen was of 135 seats. Two Airbus A320 were sold to Myanmar Airways International in 2009, S5-AAC in October and S5-AAB in December. In November 2009 new headquarters at Ljubljana International Airport were opened. A loss of €14 million was made in 2009.

=== 2010s ===
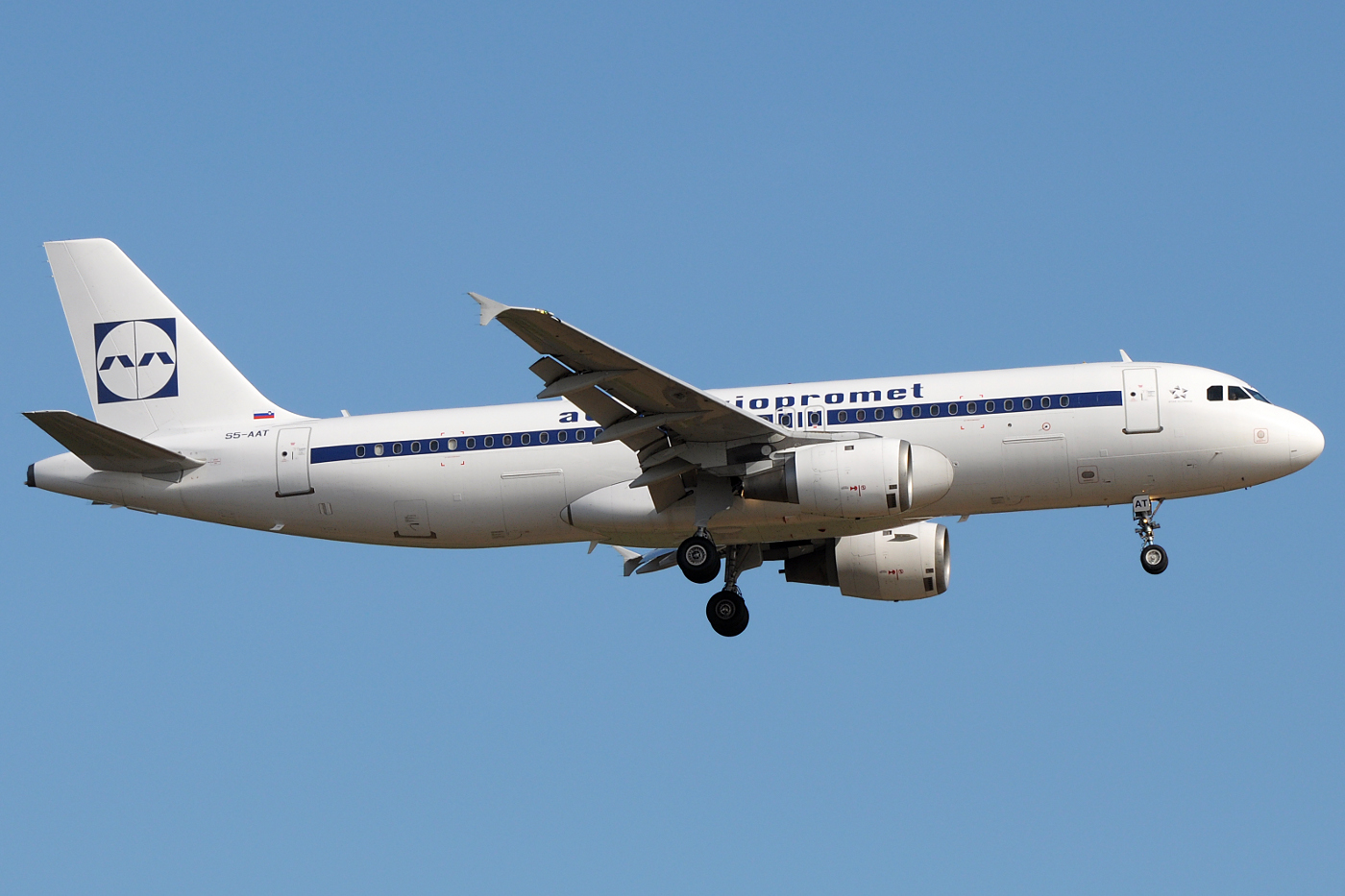
Adria Airways Airbus A320-200 in retro colours.

Adria started a new decade with a huge accumulated loss. However, the future looked bright as two brand new Airbus A319s were planned to arrive in April 2010. In March 2010, Adria added Belgrade to its schedule, which was last operated prior to the disintegration of Yugoslavia. In April 2010, all operations were moved to Maribor, as Ljubljana International airport was having its runway renovated. Later that month, Adria like many other airlines in Europe, was grounded due to the eruption of Eyjafjallajökull in Iceland.

Adria took delivery of two new Airbus A319s with a slight delay due to the volcanic eruption in April/May 2010 (Air travel disruption after the 2010 Eyjafjallajökull eruption).

In June 2010, as a part of reorganisation of the company, Adria Tehnika and Adria Flight School were created as separate companies.

New flights to Banja Luka started in July, which were operated in co-operation with Sky Srpska. Flights ended a year later. Later that month, flights to Marseille were started, offering Turkish truck drivers a connection from Istanbul via Ljubljana. These flights were cancelled at the end of 2011. In the summer of 2010 Adria's fleet consisted of an Airbus A320 (162 seats), two Airbus A319s (135 seats), four Bombardier CRJ900LR (86 seats) and seven Bombardier CRJ200LR (48/50 seats) aircraft. On 11 September 2010, Airbus A320-231 (S5-AAA), was retired and is stored at Ljubljana International Airport. With the beginning of the winter timetable, flights from Marseille were moved to Toulon. From 10 December 2010, Adria started serving new routes from Pristina, Kosovo. Destinations during the winter were Düsseldorf, Frankfurt and Munich. During summer, Brussels, Copenhagen and Paris were added to those started in the winter season.

On 14 January 2011, CEO Tadej Tufek and Executive Director Marjan Ravnikar resigned because of bad results in their last years of leadership. Klemen Boštjančič became the new CEO, and a new executive director, Robert Vuga, was named. Adria sold its shares in Adria Tehnika to Ljubljana International Airport and the Government to cover part of the loss.

In February 2011, CRJ100LR (S5-AAH) was retired and returned in August 2011 to Bombardier Capital. In March 2011, Adria celebrated its 50th anniversary. An exhibition in The National Museum of Contemporary History was made showing the history of Slovenian national carrier. As a part of immediate actions by the new management, two new Airbus aircraft were leased. An Airbus A320-231 (S5-AAS, ex EI-DOD) is leased from April 2011 for 3.5 years. It has 180 seats and is mostly operated on charter flights. At June, a second Airbus A320-211 (S5-AAT, ex CS-TNB) was supposed to be leased for 18 months but it was stored in October. It wore Adria retro colours from the 1960s. On 26 January 2012, S5-AAT was returned to the lessor GOAL which sold the aircraft.

In summer 2011, Adria operated with two Airbus A320s (180/162 seats), two Airbus A319s (135 seats), four Bombardier CRJ900 (86 seats) and 6 Bombardier CRJ200LR (50/48 seats). The 3rd Airbus A320 (S5-AAA) was still owned by Adria, but wasn't operational and was stored at Ljubljana airport.

A total loss of €63,073,630 was made in 2010. The majority of the loss was due to a revaluation of the fleet, which showed a decrease of €45,443,441 mainly because of poor market value for the CRJ200LR. Due to revaluation and accumulated losses, a financial restructuring plan was made in August. It involved the Government of Slovenia and the banks from which Adria had taken loans in the past years. According to the plan, the Government would invest €50 million and the banks would convert 25%-50% of the loans into equity. On 21 September 2011, Adria finalised the deal with the banks and the government. Together Adria got €69,720,983– €50 million from the government, and the rest as converted through the loans-to-equity swap.

With the beginning of Winter 2011/12 timetable, Adria dropped flights to Banja Luka, London, Paris, Toulon and Warsaw. The Vienna-Frankfurt route was also cancelled.

For the 2012 summer season, Adria returned to three seasonal destinations: Barcelona, London Luton and Manchester.

In August 2012, Ljubljana International Airport reported that it had a new airline to operate on a London-Luton route, and therefore Adria removed it from the winter and summer 2013 timetable.

On 24 September 2012, a leased Bombardier CRJ200LR registered S5-AAI was returned to lessor GECAS. Adria now operates five owned CRJ200LR planes and two owned CRJ900LR, two leased CRJ900LR (next gen) planes and two leased Airbus A319s along with a bigger leased Airbus A320 for a total of 12 planes.

For the 2012–13 winter season, the company operated nearly the same frequencies as in the last winter season and served the same destinations. The operational fleet was four CRJ900 and four CRJ200LR. The Airbus fleet operated on charters and would be leased out while the remaining CRJ200LR would be used on ad hoc charters (sport clubs, business/corporate, etc.) and as a back-up.

In spring of 2014, Adria began operating from Frankfurt to Tirana, Albania.

In summer of 2015, Adria began operating from Maribor to London Southend Airport, England. However, flights were terminated by the end of the season.

=== 2016 ===
In March 2016, 4K Invest, a Luxembourg-based restructuring fund, acquired 96% of Adria Airways' shares from the Slovene state. The new owner appointed Arno Schuster as the CEO of Adria.

On 1 July 2017, Adria suspended its base in the Polish city of Łódź, from which it held flights with its stationed CRJ700 aircraft, registered S5-AAZ, for the previous three years. During this time, Adria had also opened two other bases in Poland, one in Rzeszów and one in Olsztyn; however, both were terminated fairly quickly. Adria is now set to focus more on its main hub on Ljubljana Airport, which has already seen a boost in the frequencies of flights to a couple of destinations served by Adria. These destinations include Amsterdam, Podgorica, Pristina, Sarajevo and Skopje.

On 20 July 2017, Adria announced the purchase of Darwin Airline, which operated flights as Etihad Regional and was owned by Etihad Airways. The airline marketed itself as Adria Airways Switzerland, but continued its operations as Darwin Airline with the existing air operator's certificate (AOC). Adria was responsible for the marketing and some administrative and operational tasks. However, this did not directly impact the airline's operations as a whole, as the two bases remained in Geneva and Lugano.

In September 2017, it was revealed that Adria sold its brand for 8 million Euros to an undisclosed buyer in December of the previous year.

In November 2017, Adria announced new flights from the Swiss city of Bern, which came as a result of SkyWork Airlines, previously the largest operator out of Belp Airport, losing its AOC. The flights to Berlin, Hamburg, Munich and Vienna were set to begin on 6 November 2017, and were to be operated by the subsidiary Adria Airways Switzerland, however these plans were cancelled only days after the announcement, as SkyWork managed to regain its AOC.

In recent years, Adria has focused on ad hoc flights, which are mainly operated for large automotive companies, such as Ford, Chrysler and Ferrari.

On 12 December 2017, Adria's Swiss subsidiary Darwin Airline, which operated as Adria Airways Switzerland, was declared bankrupt and its AOC was revoked. The airline ended all operations.

=== Final years ===
In January 2019, Adria Airways announced it would shut down its short-lived focus city operations at Paderborn Lippstadt Airport in Germany which consisted of three routes to London (which had already ceased in late 2018), Vienna and Zürich. At the same time, major cuts to the route network from the airline's home base in Ljubljana were announced, with all services to Brač, Bucharest, Dubrovnik, Düsseldorf, Geneva, Hamburg, Kyiv, Moscow and Warsaw being terminated.

On 20 September 2019, it was made public that two of the airline's Bombardier CRJ900 aircraft had been repossessed by their lessors over unpaid bills.

On 23 September 2019, Adria Airways announced on its web site that it would temporarily suspend flight operations for two days because it lacked the liquidity needed to maintain scheduled operations. The suspension was extended for two more days on 25 September. On the same day, it emerged that several of the carrier's aircraft had been repossessed by lessors due to non-payment of leasing contracts. On 26 September, the airline announced it would continue to operate flights between Ljubljana and Frankfurt. In a third delay announcement, on 27 September, the company said that it would continue to suspend service to all destinations except Frankfurt until the afternoon of Monday the 30th. Also on 27 September, all three of the airline's Airbus A319-100s had been repossessed by their lessors.

On 30 September 2019, Adria Airways announced that it had officially filed for bankruptcy, ending 58 years of service. Accordingly, the company said that it would cancel all scheduled flights due to the initiation of bankruptcy proceedings. Slovenia's economic development minister Zdravko Počivalšek said that an option to set up a new airline within a few months in order to maintain important air links was being studied.

=== Asset auction ===
On 23 January 2020, Adria Airways assets were auctioned. The winner was Izet Rastoder, a Montenegrin businessman known as the largest banana importer in Europe. His winning bid was 45,000 euros.

== Corporate affairs and identity ==
=== Headquarters ===
Adria's corporate headquarters were located on the grounds of Ljubljana International Airport in Zgornji Brnik, Cerklje na Gorenjskem, Slovenia, near Ljubljana. In 2008 the first stone to the new Adria headquarters was laid. In November 2009 Adria moved in around 300 employees and all of its departments. The previous building, in the city of Ljubljana, was built in the 1980s. In the 1970s, Inex-Adria had its headquarters on the Ljubljana airport property like it did at the end of its operations.

=== Brand history ===
The Adria Airways corporate identity was created in the late 1980s. The tail mark symbolized a linden tree leaf, a national symbol of Slovenia.

=== Financial and operational results ===
Year	Passengers	PAX Change	Flights	Flights Change	Load Factor	Revenue (€ millions)	Net income (€ millions)	Employees
2001	801,247	Steady	—N/a	—	—N/a	109.000	+ 0.670	—N/a
2002	814,156	▲1.6%	—N/a	—	—N/a	▲118.000	▼ + 0.501	—N/a
2003	864,368	▲6.2 %	17,756	—	57.66%	▲124.000	▼ + 0.445	539
2004	884,861	▲2.4%	18,741	▲5.5%	57.95%	▲136.000	▼ + 0.177	552
2005	928,662	▲5.0%	19,833	▲5.8%	63.50%	▲137.000	▼ - 9.572	543
2006	1,018,007	▲9.6%	21,420	▲8.0%	66.40%	▲157.000	▲ + 0.070	592
2007	1,136,431	▲11.6%	23,727	▲10.8%	67.10%	▲182.000	▲ + 0.425	679
2008	1,302,172	▲14.6%	27,183	▲14.6%	65.60%	▲207.000	▼ - 3.240	719
2009	1,143,542	▼12.2%	26,133	▼3.9%	63.30%	▼164.000	▼ - 13.991	705
2010	1,170,235	▲2.3%	25,124	▼3.9%	66.50%	▼149.703	▼ - 63.073	452
2011	1,163,016	▼0.6%	24,480	▼2.6%	63.05%	▲159.875	▲ - 12.031	450
2012	987,279	▼15.1%	20,863	▼14.8%	68.99%	▼150.331	▲ - 10.801	405
2013	1,026,839	▲4.0%	19,509	▼6.5%	73.16%	▼146.701	▲ - 2.874	375
2014	1,111,762	▲8.3%	19,123	▼2.0%	71.00%	▲150.000	▲ + 0.900	370
2015	1,239,920	▲11.5%	20,280	▲6.0%	67.90%	▲152.100	▼ - 9.200	420
2016	1,103,530	▼11.0%	19,470	▼4.0%	65.50%	▲155.200	▲ + 3.233	396
2017	1,209,692	▲9.6%	20,415	▲4.9%	66.90%	—N/a	—N/a	—N/a
2018 (1st half)	576,377	▲8.6%	≈10,000	▲2.4%	63.90%	—N/a	—N/a	—N/a
Source: EX-YU Aviation News and Uporabna stran

=== Subsidiaries ===
In addition to its main operation, Adria had several subsidiaries, including:

- Adria Airways Tehnika (not owned)
- Adria Flight Career Centre
- Amadeus Slovenia
- Adria Airways Kosovo

==== Adria Airways Tehnika ====
Adria Airways Tehnika was a maintenance organization based at Ljubljana International Airport. It was the line and base maintenance provider for Adria Airways , as well as to Air Berlin, SAS Scandinavian Airlines, Air Méditerranée, Brit Air and others. Before September 2002 sporadic third party maintenance was provided for some aircraft at the site. It was the first recognized service facility for the CRJ100/200/700/900 in Europe. In mid-2005 a partnership was formed with Air France Industries to perform A & C checks on aircraft of the A320 family. In 2010 Adria Airways Tehnika was established as a separate company, employing around 250 employees. With two hangars they can serve from two to five aircraft depending on their size. In 2015 Adria Airways Tehnika was privatized and sold to Czech-Polish Avia Prime Group, owner of Polish Linetech, and Serbian Jat Tehnika Maintenance Organisations. The name of the company was then rebranded to Adria Tehnika.

Adria Flight Career Center

Adria Flight Career Center was established in 1980 in cooperation with the Faculty of mechanical engineering in Ljubljana. Its purpose was training of commercial and airline pilots for the needs of Adria Airways. It also trained many private pilots, flight instructors as well as many pilots from Yugoslavia, Libya, Scandinavia and other countries and has trained about 2800 pilots. In the beginning it had very unified Piper aircraft fleet made of 4 PA-38 Tomahawk, one PA-28 Warrior, 2 PA-28 Arrow, one PA-34 Seneca and FNPT II simulator for IR and MCC training. Later the school sold the Piper Seneca and resorted to renting of twin-engine aircraft (mostly Diamond DA42) in Austria. Single engined Piper aircraft were also replaced with Czech-made Sport Cruiser aircraft. Diverse fleet, together with the lack of vision and organizational difficulties caused numerous training delays as well as lower quality of the training. When the parent company went bankrupt, many of the students who prepaid their training lost substantial amounts of money.

==== Adria Airways Switzerland ====
Adria Airways Switzerland was the marketing name of Darwin Airline, which operated all of its flights, and was a Swiss subsidiary of Adria Airways. It was owned by Etihad Airways and branded as Etihad Regional, with bases at Geneva and Lugano in Switzerland. All flights by this unit ceased operations on 12 December 2017.

== Destinations ==
As of Summer 2017, Adria Airways operated a main hub at Ljubljana Jože Pučnik International Airport, as well as the secondary hub at Pristina International Airport Adem Jashari and Tirana International Airport Nënë Tereza. The majority of Adria Airways' business was in scheduled flights, but it also provided charter and ad hoc flights. As of July 2017, Adria operated to 24 scheduled and 22 charter destinations throughout Europe. Most of the flights were operated out of Ljubljana Jože Pučnik International Airport, the airline's primary hub, but it also operates both scheduled and charter flights out of Pristina Airport and Tirana Airport. It had been a Star Alliance member since 2004 and a Lufthansa partner since 1996. The airline's scheduled charter flights were for the most part seasonal, and most frequently to holiday destinations in the Mediterranean region. Sharm el-Sheikh and Hurghada in Egypt were served all year round to a schedule.

=== Codeshare agreements ===
Adria Airways had codeshare agreements with the following airlines:

- Aeroflot
- Air Canada
- Air France
- Air India
- Air Serbia
- Austrian Airlines
- Brussels Airlines
- KLM
- LOT Polish Airlines
- Lufthansa
- Montenegro Airlines
- Scandinavian Airlines
- Singapore Airlines
- Swiss International Air Lines
- Turkish Airlines

== Fleet ==
=== Final fleet ===
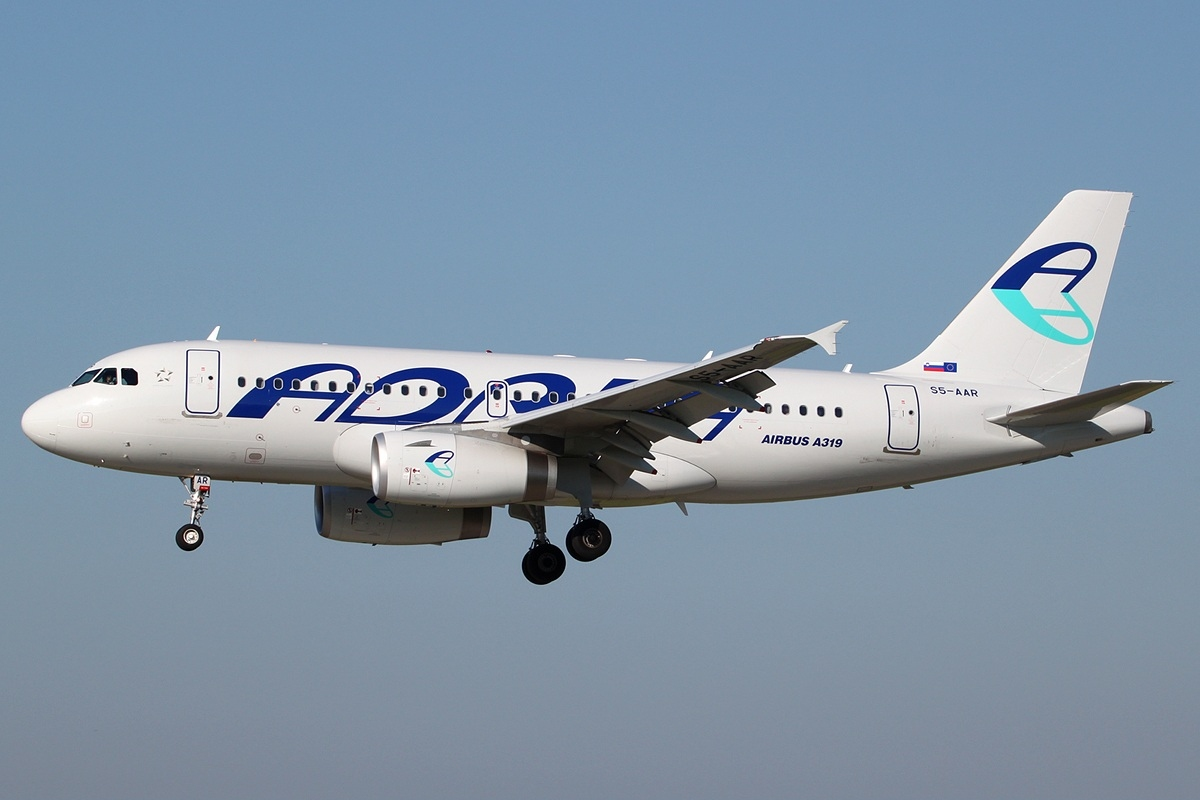
Adria Airways Airbus A319-100

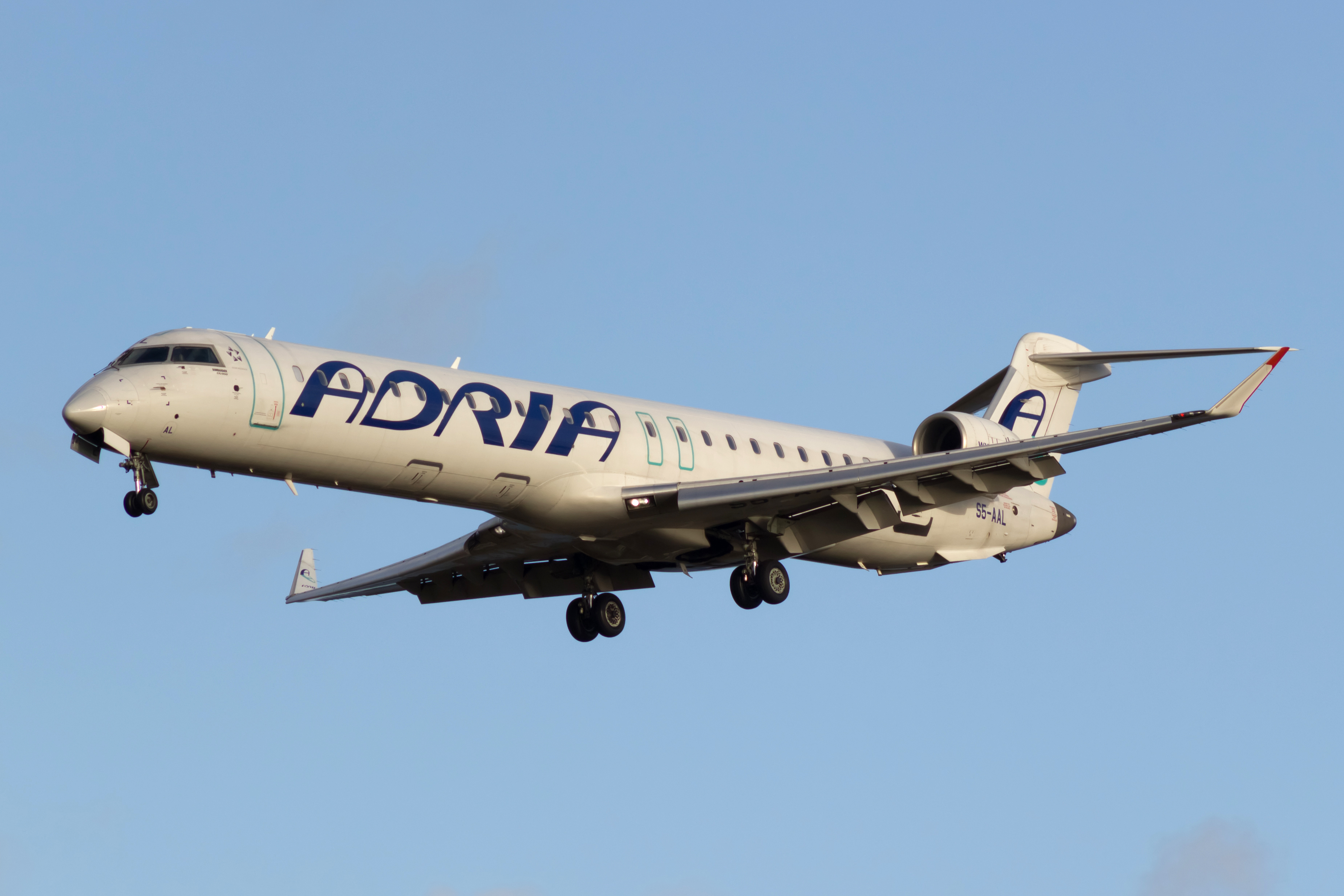
Adria Airways Bombardier CRJ900

At the time of closure, Adria Airways' fleet comprised the following aircraft:

Adria Airways fleet
Aircraft	In service	Orders	Passengers	Notes
Airbus A319-100	3	—	142	
Airbus A319-100	3	—	144	
Bombardier CRJ700ER	2	—	70	One wet-leased to Luxair.
Bombardier CRJ700ER	2	—	72	One wet-leased to Luxair.
Bombardier CRJ900LR	9	3	86	Two wet-leased to Austrian Airlines. Two wet-leased to Lufthansa. One painted in Star Alliance livery.
Bombardier CRJ900LR	9	3	90	Two wet-leased to Austrian Airlines. Two wet-leased to Lufthansa. One painted in Star Alliance livery.
Saab 2000	6	—	50	Two wet-leased to Swiss International Air Lines. Two aircraft stored.
Total	20	3		

=== Former fleet ===
Adria Airways had formerly operated the following aircraft before it ceased operations:

Adria Airways former fleet
Aircraft	Total	Introduced	Retired	Notes
Airbus A320-200	7	1989	2014	
ATR 72-600	1	2018	2019	short term lease
BAC One Eleven Series 500	1	1985	1986	Leased from TAROM
Boeing 737-400	1	2007	2007	Leased from Ukraine International Airlines
Boeing 737-500	1	2006	2006	Leased from Cirrus Airlines
Boeing 737-500	2	2007	2009	Leased from Ukraine International Airlines
Bombardier CRJ100/200	9	1998	2015	
de Havilland Canada Dash 7	2	1984	1998	
Douglas DC-6A/B	6	1961	1976	
Douglas DC-8-55CF	1	1972	1972	Leased from Seaboard World Airlines
Fokker F-27 Friendship	1	2006	2007	leased
Fokker 100	1	2008	2008	Leased from Carpatair
Fokker 100	1	2017	2019	Leased from Carpatair
Learjet 35	1	1986	1993	
McDonnell Douglas DC-9-32 & DC-9-33RC	11	1969	1998	
McDonnell Douglas DC-9-51	2	1976	1989	
McDonnell Douglas MD-81/MD-82	6	1981	1995	
Saab 340A	2	2006	2008	
Sud Aviation Caravelle	1	1972	1972	

== Incidents and accidents ==
- 30 October 1975: Inex-Adria Aviopromet Flight 450, a Douglas DC-9-32, hit high ground during an approach in fog near Prague-Suchdol, Czechoslovakia. The total death toll was 79. The crash killed 75 of the 120 people on board, while 4 others died later in hospital.
- 10 September 1976: an Inex-Adria Douglas DC-9-31 and a Hawker Siddeley Trident 3B of British Airways were involved in a mid-air collision over Zagreb, killing 176 people. The collision was attributed to an air traffic control error.
- 1 December 1981: Inex-Adria Aviopromet Flight 1308, a McDonnell Douglas MD-82, crashed in the mountains while approaching Campo dell'Oro Airport in Ajaccio, Corsica. All 180 people on board were killed.
