= Ljubljana Airport =

Airport in Brnik, Slovenia

Ljubljana Airport Letališče Jožeta Pučnika Ljubljana

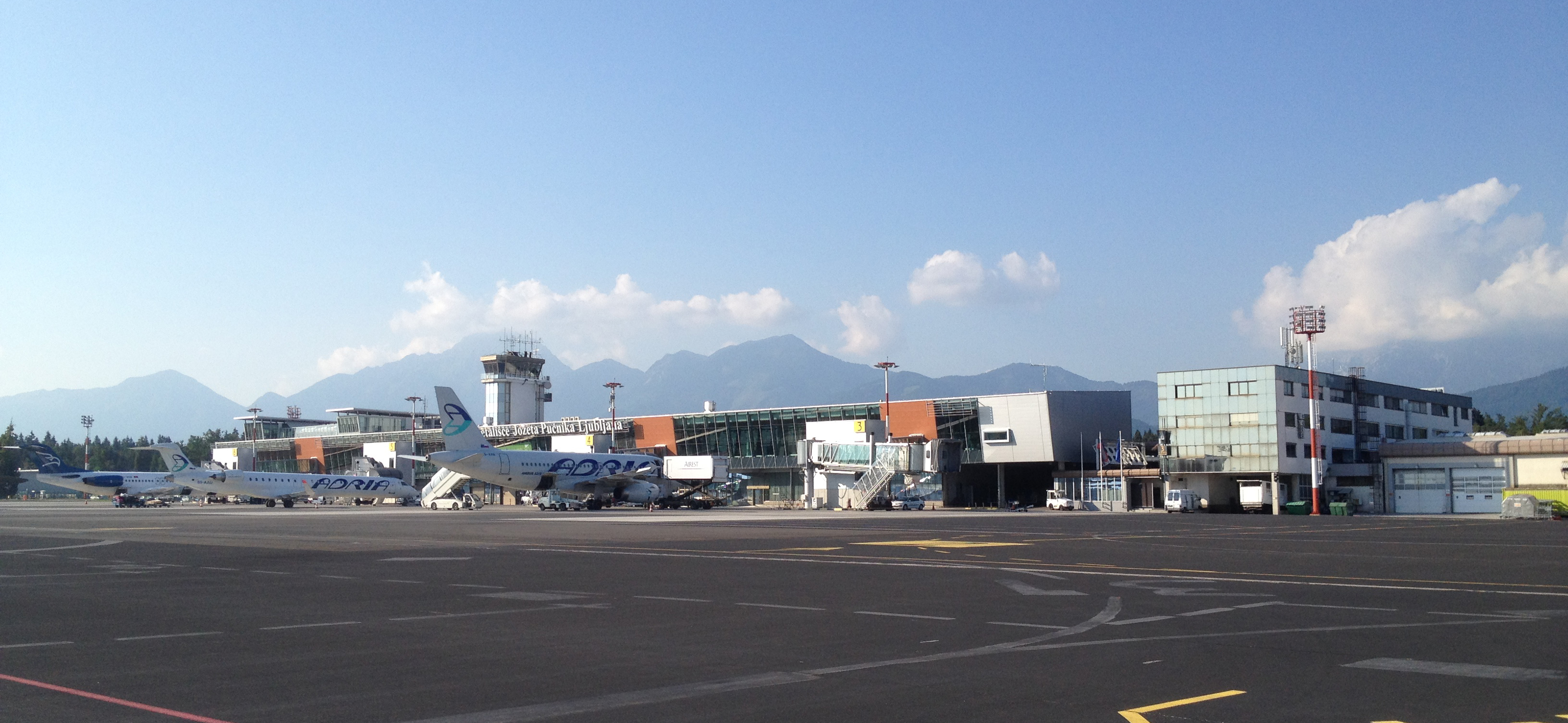
- IATA: LJU; ICAO: LJLJ

Summary
- Airport type: Public
- Owner: Fraport Slovenia d.o.o.
- Operator: Fraport Slovenia d.o.o.
- Serves: Ljubljana, Slovenia
- Location: Zgornji Brnik
- Opened: December 1963; 62 years ago
- Elevation AMSL: 388 m (1,273 ft)
- Coordinates: 46°13′28″N 14°27′22″E
- Website: lju-airport.si

Map
- Location of airport in Slovenia LJU (Europe)

Runways
Direction	Length		Surface
Direction	m	ft	Surface
12/30	3,300	10,827	Asphalt

Statistics (2025)
- Total Passengers: ▲1,591,443
- Aircraft movements: ▼24,665
- Cargo (metric tons): ▼11,909
- Source: Slovenian AIP at EUROCONTROL; Statistics from Fraport

Ljubljana Airport (Slovene: Letališče Jožeta Pučnika Ljubljana) (IATA: LJU, ICAO: LJLJ), also known by its previous name Brnik Airport (Slovene: Letališče Brnik), is the international airport serving Ljubljana and the largest airport in Slovenia. It is located near Brnik, 24 km (15 mi) northwest of Ljubljana and 9.5 km (5.9 mi) east of Kranj, at the foothills of Kamnik–Savinja Alps.

== History ==
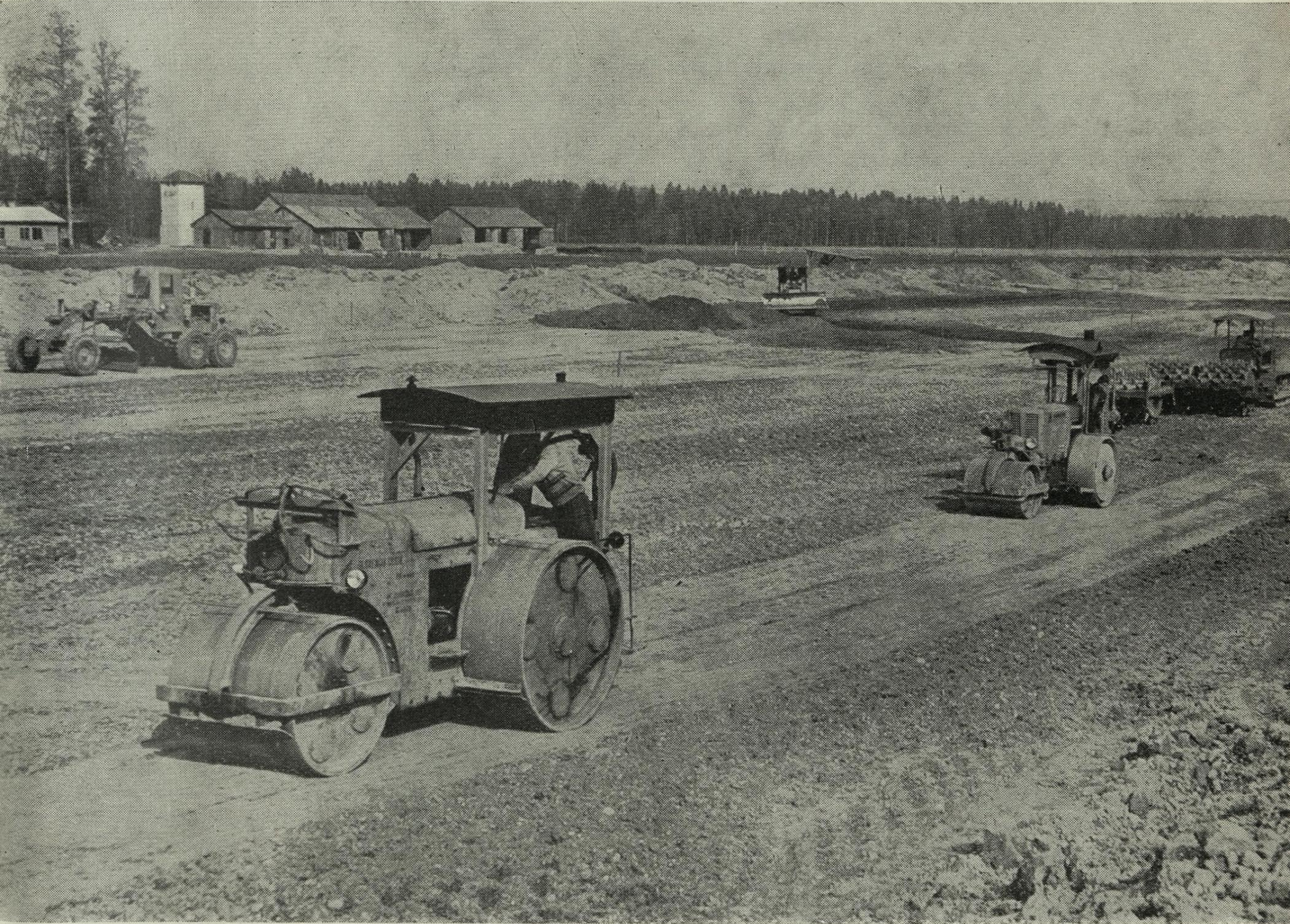
Construction site of the airport in 1963

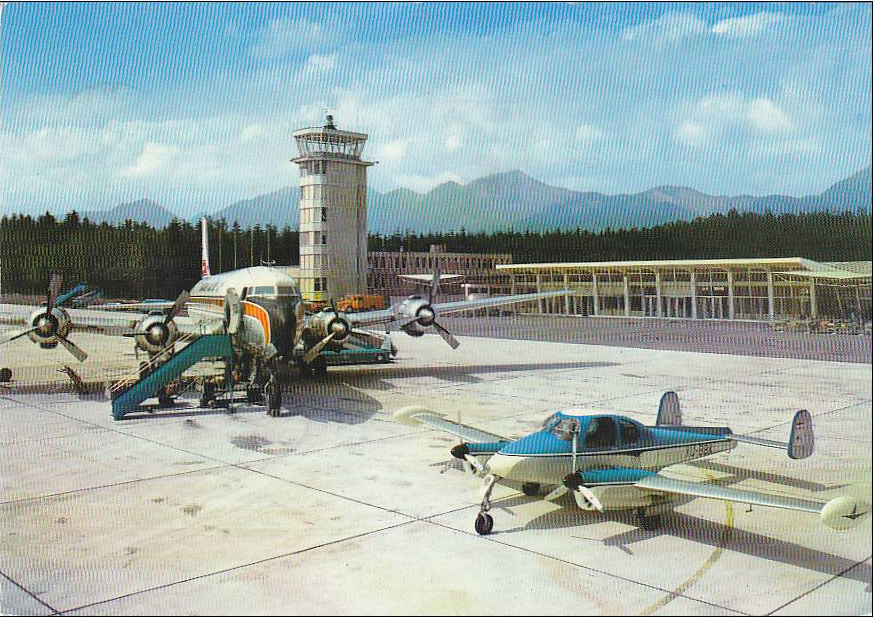
The airport in 1967

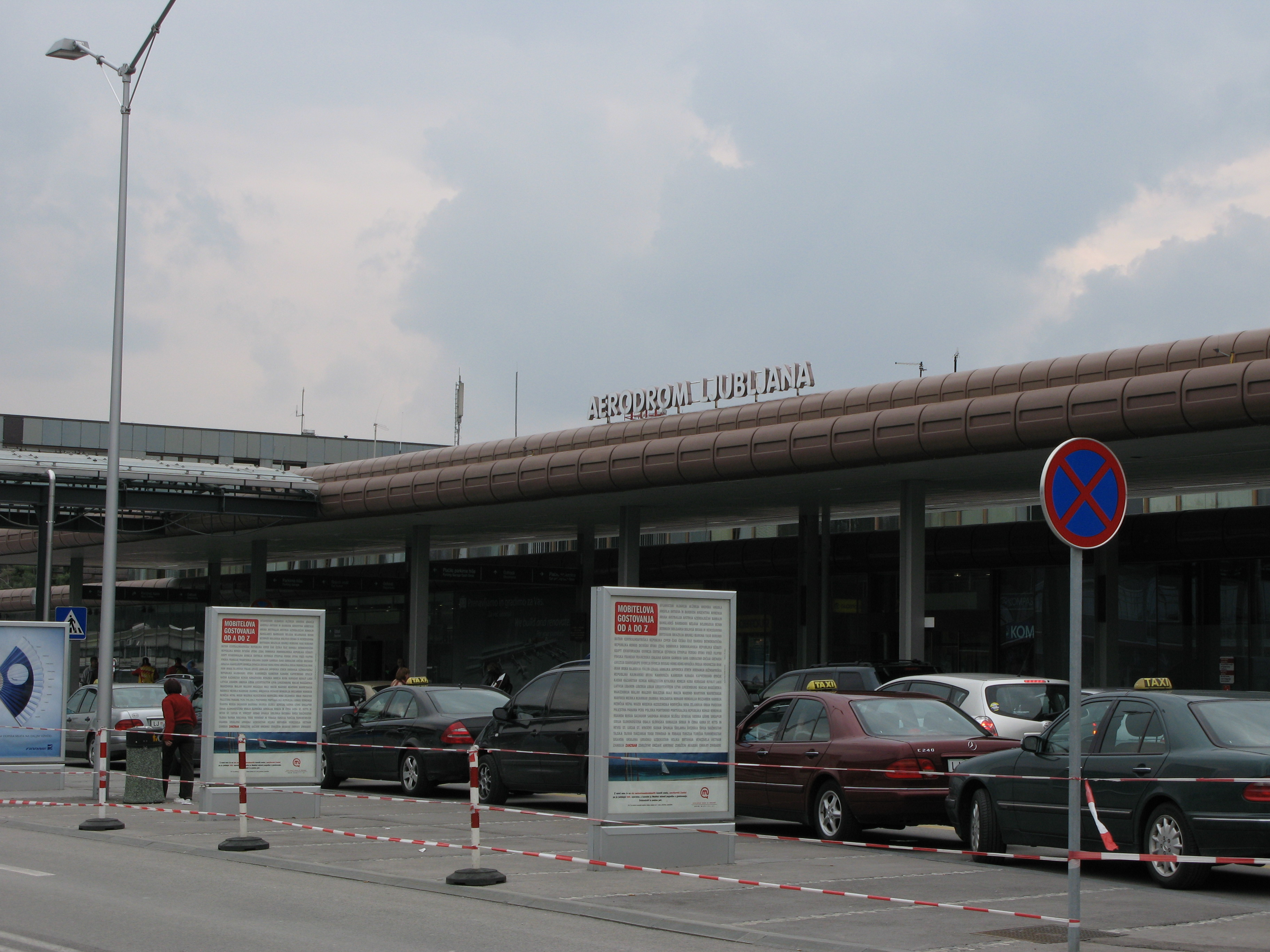
Passenger terminal in 2007

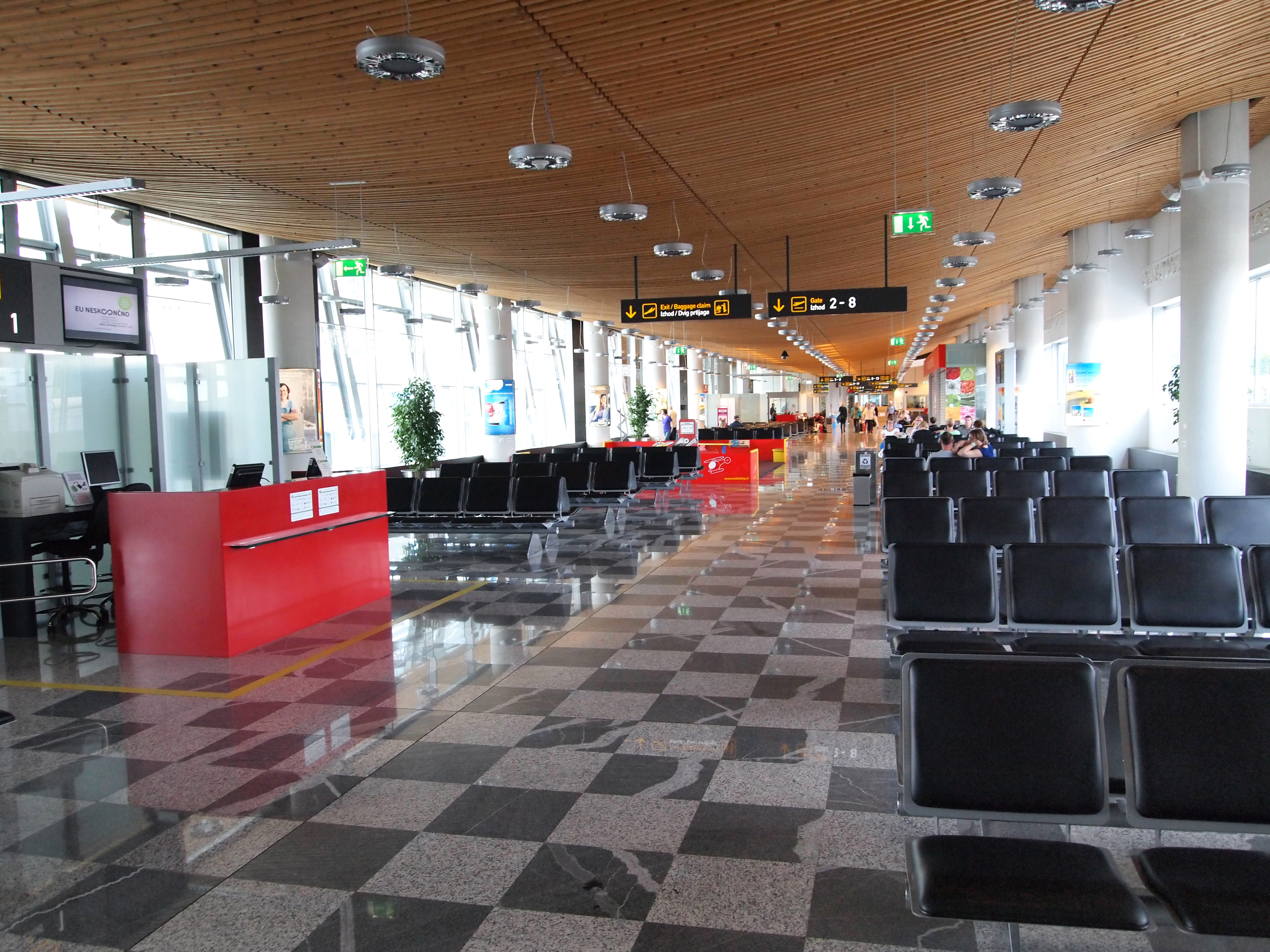
Terminal interior

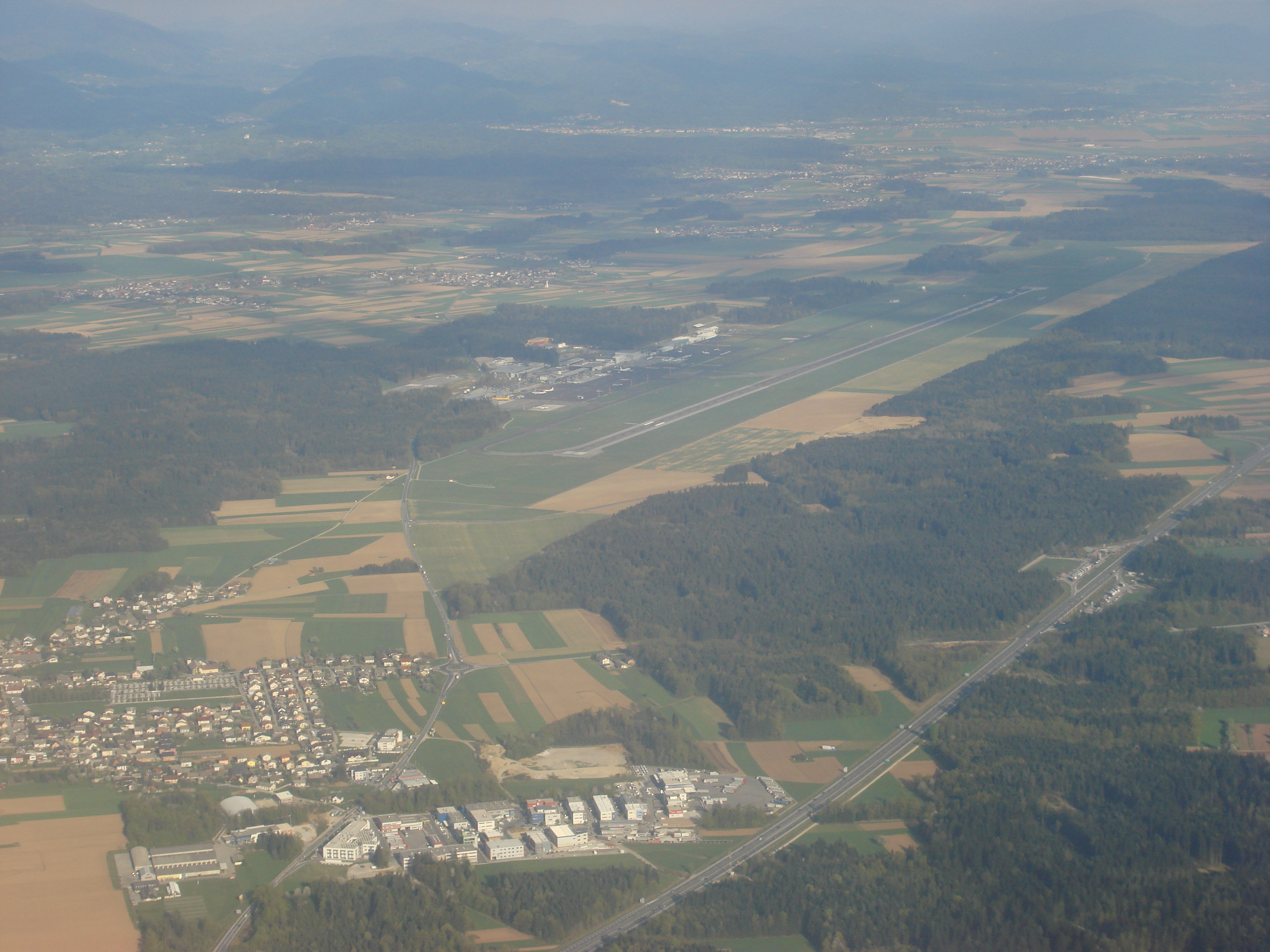
Aerial view of the airport and its surroundings

The airport was officially opened in December 1963. It replaced Polje Airport in the former Municipality of Polje near Ljubljana, which served as the city's airport from 1933 and was Slovenia's first civil airport. Regular flights from the new airport at Brnik began in January 1964.

In the 1980s, Jat Airways offered flights from Chicago to Belgrade that included a nonstop segment between New York City and Ljubljana. The airline employed McDonnell Douglas DC-10s on the route. However, the flight from Belgrade to Chicago did not stop in Ljubljana.

On 27 June 1991, two days after Slovenia's Independence from Yugoslavia, the Yugoslav People's Army began its military operations within the country. The airport was bombed during the first day of the war. The next day, 28 June, two journalists from Austria and Germany, Nikolas Vogel and Norbert Werner, were killed from a missile that struck their car near the airport, where they were both driving by during that time. Four Adria Airways airliners also took serious damage from the Yugoslav Air Force. The fighting ended on 7 July with the Brioni Agreement.

On 8 December 2004, the airport received its first annual millionth passenger. Overall, the airport handled 1,721,355 passengers in 2019, representing a 5% drop in traffic figures compared to the previous year.

In 2007, the right-wing government proposed renaming the airport from Aerodrom Ljubljana to Ljubljana Jože Pučnik Airport. Jože Pučnik was a Slovene right-wing public intellectual, dissident, politician, and leader of the Democratic Opposition of Slovenia (Demos) between 1989 and 1992.

Due to growing air traffic and Slovenia's EU entry, which requires the separation of traffic into Schengen and non-Schengen, Aerodrom Ljubljana Airport Authorities have prepared a redevelopment plan for the passenger terminal. The expansion was to be carried out in two phases. Works on the first phase began in early July 2007 to accommodate Slovenia's entry into the Schengen Area in December 2007. The terminal building (T1) was extended with a new upper level which added an additional 4,000 m^{2} (43,000 sq ft) to the departure lounge and four jetways have also been installed for easier passenger access to and from the terminal. In 2013, the second phase of terminal expansion which included a new terminal T2 was scrapped by the minority stakeholders.

In 2014, the Slovenian government initiated a privatisation process of the airport. The bid was won by Fraport which, in turn, acquired a 75.5% stake in the airport. The remaining shares were acquired in the following months resulting in Fraport taking 100% ownership of the airport.

== Facilities ==
=== Runway ===
The airport has a 3,300 m × 60 m (10,827 ft × 197 ft) paved runway which is equipped with ILS Cat IIIb on runway 30. NDB and VOR approach are also available.

=== Expansion plan ===
In April 2017 the airport operator Fraport Slovenia announced a plan to expand the existing passenger terminal. A modular solution was proposed which can be carried out in phases that are effectively and continuously adapted to traffic development needs.

The first phase of the terminal expansion was opened for traffic in July 2021. The capacity of the departures area was increased from 500 passengers per hour to 1,250 passengers per hour. A new 10,000 m^{2} (110,000 sq ft) extension was built to the west of the old terminal building. It includes a large duty-free shop, a new business lounge, one new air bridge, as well as renovated food & beverage and promotional areas. There are 22 check-in desks and five long security lines available. A new baggage sorting area was also added and the baggage reclaim area was expanded and equipped with two long carousels.

The existing passenger terminal, which covers 13,000 m^{2} (140,000 sq ft), was partly renovated and functionally incorporated with the new building. The construction began in July 2019 and was completed in June 2021 in time for Slovenia's Presidency of the Council of the European Union. The entire renovated and expanded terminal complex covers a total of 28,587 m^{2} (307,710 sq ft).

In 2017 Fraport Slovenija also published a revised Master Plan for the period 2010–2040. It includes a plan to construct a new 6,000 m^{2} (65,000 sq ft) cargo terminal to the east of the airport complex, expansion of passenger and aircraft maintenance aprons and a relocation of the general aviation apron to the west. To the north, a business and logistics center named Airport City is planned. It will include various business and logistic facilities as well as a new hotel, there are multiple subsidies as well as incentives for the potential investor. In January 2018 a new road from Kranj to Mengeš that will enable the development of the Airport City was opened.

== Airlines and destinations ==
=== Passenger ===
The following airlines operate regular scheduled and seasonal flights to and from Ljubljana Jože Pučnik Airport:

Airlines	Destinations
Aegean Airlines	Athens
Air France	Paris–Charles de Gaulle
Air Montenegro	Podgorica
Air Serbia	Belgrade Niš
airBaltic	Seasonal: Gran Canaria, Riga, Tenerife–South
British Airways	Seasonal: London–Heathrow
Brussels Airlines	Brussels
easyJet	Berlin (resumes 7 April 2027), London–Gatwick, London–Luton, Manchester; Seasonal: Edinburgh
Finnair	Seasonal: Helsinki
Flydubai	Dubai–International
GP Aviation	Pristina
Iberia	Seasonal: Madrid
Israir	Seasonal: Tel Aviv
KLM	Amsterdam
LOT Polish Airlines	Warsaw–Chopin
Lufthansa	Frankfurt; Seasonal: Munich
Luxair	Seasonal: Luxembourg
Nesma Airlines	Seasonal charter: Hurghada
Norwegian Air Shuttle	Seasonal: Copenhagen
Nouvelair	Seasonal charter: Monastir
Pegasus Airlines	Istanbul–Sabiha Gökçen
Scandinavian Airlines	Seasonal: Copenhagen (begins 25 June 2027)
Swiss International Air Lines	Zürich
TUI fly Belgium	Seasonal: Brussels (begins 28 March 2027)
TUI fly Deutschland	Seasonal: Düsseldorf (begins 4 May 2027)
Turkish Airlines	Istanbul
United Airlines	Seasonal: Newark (begins 13 May 2027)
Vueling	Barcelona
Wizz Air	Podgorica, Skopje

=== Cargo ===
Airlines	Destinations
ASL Airlines	Venice
ASL Airlines France	Paris–Charles de Gaulle
DHL Aviation	Leipzig/Halle
Lipican Aer	Sarajevo
SprintAir	Cologne
SwiftAir Hellas	Belgrade

== Statistics ==
=== Traffic figures and development ===
Pre-2014
Year	Passengers	Change	Cargo (t)	Change	Aircraft movements	Change
1964	78,179	/	88	/	2,343	/
1965	133,184	▲70%	177	▲101%	3,180	▲36%
1966	136,584	▲3%	235	▲33%	4,099	▲29%
1967	136,665	0%	306	▲30%	4,479	▲9%
1968	68,303	▼50%	304	▼1%	3,807	▼15%
1969	96,108	▲41%	1,068	▲251%	4,474	▲18%
1970	171,503	▲78%	1,879	▲76%	5,728	▲28%
1971	273,946	▲60%	2,288	▲22%	6,509	▲14%
1972	275,460	▲1%	3,016	▲32%	8,525	▲31%
1973	367,872	▲34%	4,578	▲52%	8,633	▲1%
1974	668,599	▲82%	7,210	▲57%	13,123	▲52%
1975	553,565	▼17%	7,376	▲2%	11,645	▼11%
1976	528,490	▼5%	5,922	▼20%	10,797	▼7%
1977	541,592	▲2%	6,179	▲4%	10,964	▲2%
1978	475,242	▼12%	5,758	▼7%	8,941	▼18%
1979	661,254	▲39%	7,602	▲32%	12,397	▲39%
1980	581,103	▼12%	6,085	▼20%	11,312	▼9%
1981	659,465	▲13%	7,328	▲20%	11,805	▲4%
1982	627,931	▼5%	6,627	▼10%	10,870	▼8%
1983	595,260	▼5%	6,808	▲3%	9,743	▼10%
1984	623,588	▲5%	7,356	▲8%	10,050	▲3%
1985	668,285	▲7%	6,751	▼8%	11,624	▲16%
1986	785,281	▲18%	7,507	▲11%	12,518	▲8%
1987	886,281	▲13%	7,450	▼1%	14,038	▲12%
1988	835,206	▼6%	7,261	▼3%	13,716	▼2%
1989	725,064	▼13%	6,752	▼7%	14,296	▲4%
1990	765,033	▲6%	5,878	▼13%	16,253	▲14%
1991	347,583	▼55%	4,662	▼21%	8,794	▼46%
1992	248,851	▼28%	5,074	▲9%	8,861	▲1%
1993	402,563	▲62%	8,420	▲66%	12,898	▲46%
1994	497,456	▲24%	9,881	▲17%	15,821	▲23%
1995	638,268	▲28%	10,499	▲6%	17,868	▲13%
1996	668,532	▲5%	9,294	▼11%	18,190	▲2%
1997	713,696	▲7%	10,161	▲9%	20,279	▲11%
1998	786,600	▲10%	10,953	▲8%	25,723	▲27%
1999	895,540	▲14%	11,093	▲1%	27,219	▲6%
2000	991,693	▲11%	12,396	▲12%	29,965	▲10%
2001	894,130	▼10%	12,403	▲1%	29,050	▼3%
2002	872,966	▼2%	12,021	▼3%	28,751	▼1%
2003	928,397	▲6%	12,080	▲1%	31,737	▲10%
2004	1,048,238	▲13%	11,780	▼2%	35,502	▲12%
2005	1,218,896	▲16%	11,560	▼2%	37,767	▲6%
2006	1,334,355	▲9%	15,309	▲32%	40,991	▲9%
2007	1,524,028	▲14%	21,717	▲42%	46,517	▲13%
2008	1,673,050	▲10%	17,188	▼21%	47,926	▲3%
2009	1,433,855	▼14%	14,333	▼17%	45,492	▼5%
2010	1,388,651	▼3%	17,310	▲21%	42,569	▼6%
2011	1,369,485	▼1%	19,659	▲14%	39,267	▼8%
2012	1,198,911	▼12%	17,031	▼13%	35,019	▼11%
2013	1,321,153	▲10%	17,777	▲4%	33,112	▼5%

Traffic at Ljubljana Jože Pučnik Airport
Year	Passengers	Change	Cargo (t)	Change	Aircraft movements	Change
2014	1,307,379	▲3.1%	9,831	▲6.2%	31,405	▼5.2%
2015	1,438,304	▲10.0%	10,140	▲3.1%	32,893	▲4.7%
2016	1,404,831	▼2.3%	10,379	▲2.4%	32,702	▼0.6%
2017	1,683,045	▲19.8%	12,324	▲18.7%	34,467	▲5.4%
2018	1,812,411	▲7.7%	12,378	▲0.4%	35,512	▲3.0%
2019	1,721,355	▼5.0%	11,365	▼8.2%	31,489	▼11.3%
2020	288,235	▼83.3%	10,559	▼7.1%	12,980	▼58.8%
2021	421,934	▲46.4%	11,401	▲8.0%	17,461	▲34.5%
2022	970,152	▲129.9%	12,480	▲9.5%	21,571	▲23.5%
2023	1,270,382	▲30.9%	11,443	▼8.3%	22,749	▲5.5%
2024	1,438,713	▲13.3%	12,353	▲8.0%	25,457	▲11.9%
2025	1,591,443	▲10.6%	11,909	▼3.6%	24,665	▼3.1%
2026 (30.9.)	1,426,602	▲15.7%	8,826	▲0.0%	20,146	▲5.4%
Source: Fraport Annual Reports

=== Busiest routes ===
Top 10 busiest routes from Ljubljana in 2024
Rank	Airport	Passengers	Airlines
1	Istanbul	191,962	Turkish Airlines
2	Frankfurt	137,768	Lufthansa
3	Zurich	120,675	Swiss International Air Lines
4	Belgrade	86,149	Air Serbia
5	London–Gatwick	80,524	easyJet
6	Munich	76,953	Lufthansa
7	Brussels	71,583	Brussels Airlines
8	Paris–Charles de Gaulle	65,496	Air France
9	London–Heathrow	63,822	British Airways
10	Amsterdam	60,656	KLM, Transavia

== Ground transport ==
The airport is served by an exit off the A2 motorway and by bus services connecting it with the surrounding cities of Ljubljana, Kranj, Kamnik as well as Klagenfurt and its airport in Austria. Plans for a railway line connecting the airport with the city of Ljubljana and possibly also Kranj and Kamnik have been presented in the past, however the line most likely won't be built in the near future. The Airport is connected with many bigger Slovenian cities by bus and shuttle connections. Klagenfurt is connected by the Alpe Adria bus line. Other means of transportation to and from the airport are limited to the taxi services which are not controlled by the airport authority or Fraport Slovenija, and shared shuttle service with ticket sale point in the main arrival lobby.

== See also ==
- List of airports in Slovenia
- Transport in Slovenia
