= Zgornji Brnik =

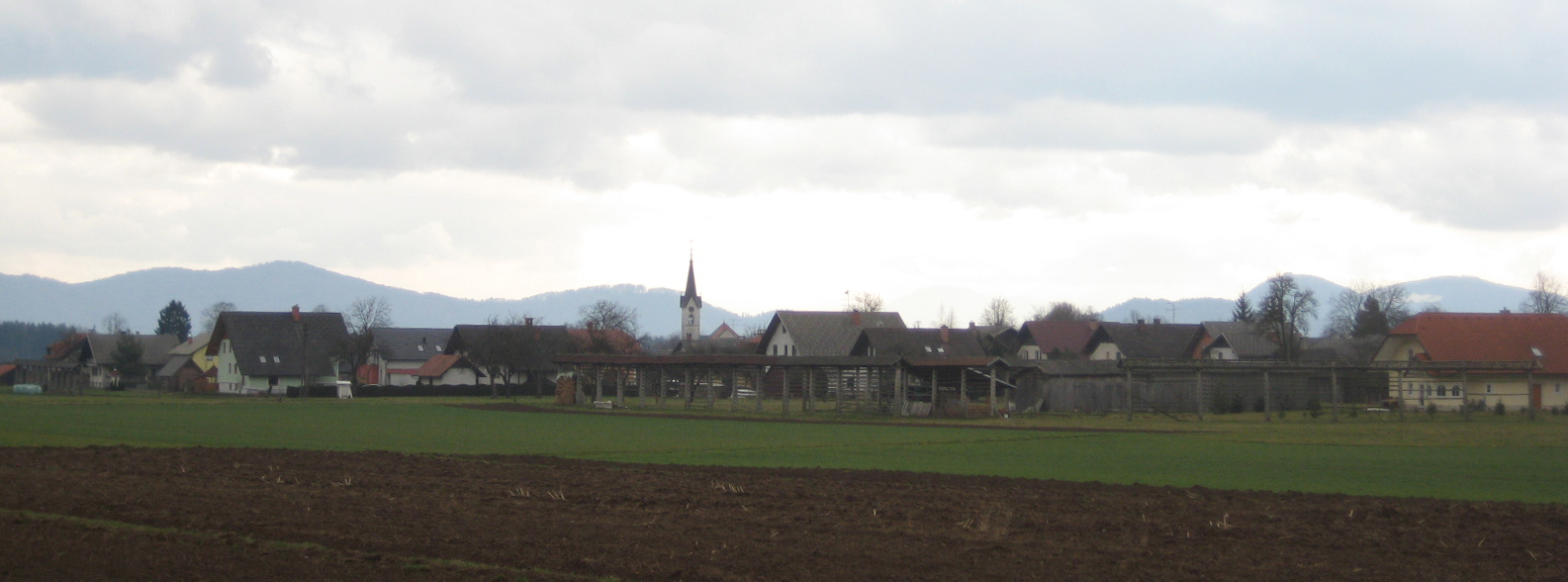

- Location in Slovenia
- Coordinates: 46°14′23.06″N 14°29′9.07″E
- Country: Slovenia
- Traditional Region: Upper Carniola
- Statistical region: Upper Carniola
- Municipality: Cerklje na Gorenjskem
- Elevation: 377.5 m (1,239 ft)

Population (2020)
  - Total: 720

Zgornji Brnik (pronounced [ˈzɡoːɾnji ˈbəɾːnik]; in older sources also Zgornji Bernik, German: Oberfernig) is a village in the Municipality of Cerklje na Gorenjskem in the Upper Carniola region of Slovenia.

The church in the village is dedicated to John the Baptist. Remains of a Gothic presbyterium have been excavated, but the current church dates to 1742.

The central part of Ljubljana Jože Pučnik Airport is built within the territory of Zgornji Brnik. The head office of Adria Airways was located on the airport property in Zgornji Brnik until the airline ceased operations in 2019.
