= List of airlines of Yugoslavia =

This is a list of airlines that were active in Yugoslavia.

Yugoslavia was a country that existed between 1918 and 1992 (this article excludes data of the FR Yugoslavia that existed between 1992 and 2003 when it was renamed Serbia and Montenegro). Created at the end of the First World War in 1918 when the Kingdom of Serbia absorbed South-Slav inhabited territories of Austro-Hungary, Yugoslavia existed as a monarchy until the start of Second World War, which for Yugoslavia was in 1941. In 1927 the first airline was created, Aeroput, which became the flag carrier and the 10th airline company founded in Europe and the 21st in the world. It operated all domestic and international flights to Central and Southeastern Europe.

In 1945, at the end of Second World War, the monarchy was abolished, and a communist regime came to power. In 1948, after Tito-Stalin split, Yugoslavia exited Eastern bloc, and, initiated a policy of world neutrality which later materialised in Yugoslavia becoming one of the founders and a leading force of the Non-Aligned Movement. This made Yugoslavia to be open and have access to both, Western and Eastern markets. Yugoslav companies operated both and also domestic-built aircraft and were for decades the only ones from communist countries to operate Western-built aircraft. In 1947, Aeroput was reactivated and renamed JAT Yugoslav Airlines becoming the flag carrier. Until the early 1990s, JAT operated destinations to Europe, Asia, Australia, Africa, and North America. In the 1970s more companies were created, mostly for charter flights, namely Belgrade-based Aviogenex, Ljubljana-based Adria Airways (known until 1988 as Inex-Adria), and Zagreb-based Pan Adria (renamed in 1978 to Trans Adria).

The late 1980s and early 1990s saw a boom of the creation of regional companies, some of them later becoming the flag carriers of the newly formed countries after the dissolution of Yugoslavia in 1992. However, the entire airline industry, which was well developed and in continuous expansion, suffered a huge setback in the 1990s with the Yugoslav Wars and UN-imposed sanctions.

Airline	Image	IATA	ICAO	Callsign	Commenced operations	Ceased operations	Notes
Aeroput					1927	1948	Absorbed by JAT Yugoslav Airlines
Air Commerce					1991		Ceased operations by late 1990s
Air Yugoslavia		JR	YRG	Yugair	1969	2005	Charter
Aviogenex		JJ	AGX	GENEX	1968	2015	
Inex-Adria		JP	ADR	ADRIA	1961	2019	Became Adria Airways, the flag carrier of Slovenia. Ceased operations on 30 September, 2019
JAT Yugoslav Airlines		JU	JAT	JAT	1947	2003	Yugoslav flag carrier. Rebranded as Jat Airways, became Air Serbia in 2014, flag carrier of Serbia
JUSTA				JUSTA	1946	1949	Yugoslav/Soviet company
Pan Adria Airways					1971	1982	Renamed in 1978 to Trans Adria absorbed by JAT
Zagal		OU	CTN	CROATIA	1989	present	Renamed Croatia Airlines in 1992, becoming the Croatian flag carrier

== See also ==
- List of airlines of Bosnia and Herzegovina
- List of defunct airlines of Bosnia and Herzegovina
- List of airlines of Croatia
- List of defunct airlines of Croatia
- List of airlines of Kosovo
- List of defunct airlines of Kosovo
- List of airlines of North Macedonia
- List of defunct airlines of North Macedonia
- List of airlines of Montenegro
- List of defunct airlines of Montenegro
- List of airlines of Serbia
- List of defunct airlines of Serbia
- List of airlines of Slovenia
- List of defunct airlines of Slovenia
