= List of defunct airlines of Bosnia and Herzegovina =

This is a list of defunct airlines of Bosnia and Herzegovina.

Airline	Image	IATA	ICAO	Callsign	Commenced operations	Ceased operations	Notes
Air Bosna		JA	BON	Bosna Air	1996	2003	Relaunched as B&H Airlines in 2006
Air Commerce			ACS;CSB		1991	1992	
Air Srpska		R6	SBK	AIR SRPSKA	1999	2003	
Arnoro			ARN	ARNORO	2004	2007	
Avio Piva			APB		2004	2006	
B&H Airlines		JA	BON		2006	2015	Reformed out of Air Bosna assets
Bio Air			BIO		1997	2002	
Bosnia Airlines					2004	2005	Trading name of flights between Mostar and Zagreb operated by Trade Air of Croatia
Bosnian Wand Airlines		H3	HRM	HERMES	2014	2015	
Dardan Air			DEP		2000	2001	
FlyBosnia		6W	FBS		2019	2020	
Mast Air					2000	2000	
Sky Bosnia			SBN		2011	2012	
Sky Srpska					2007	2011	Failed project

== See also ==
- List of airlines of Bosnia and Herzegovina
- List of airports in Bosnia and Herzegovina
- List of airlines of Yugoslavia
