= List of companies of Montenegro =

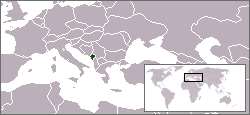
Location of Montenegro

Montenegro is a sovereign state in Southeastern Europe. Classified by the World Bank as an upper middle-income country, Montenegro is a member of the UN, NATO, the World Trade Organization, the Organization for Security and Co-operation in Europe, the Council of Europe, the Central European Free Trade Agreement and a founding member of the Union for the Mediterranean. Montenegro is also a candidate negotiating to join the European Union.

This is a list of notable companies in Montenegro, grouped by their Industry Classification Benchmark sector.

== Notable firms ==
This list includes notable companies with primary headquarters located in the country. The industry and sector follow the Industry Classification Benchmark taxonomy. Organizations which have ceased operations are included and noted as defunct.

Notable companies Status: P=Private, S=State; A=Active, D=Defunct
Name	Industry	Sector	Headquarters	Founded	Notes	Status	
Aluminium Plant Podgorica	Basic materials	Aluminium	Podgorica	1969	Aluminium	P	A
Budvanska Rivijera	Consumer services	Hotels	Budva	1990	Hotels	P	A
Central Bank of Montenegro	Financials	Banks	Podgorica	2001	Central bank	S	A
Crnogorski Elektroprenosni Sistem	Utilities	Conventional electricity	Podgorica	2009	Power transmission	P	A
Crnogorski Telekom	Telecommunications	Fixed line telecommunications	Podgorica	1998	Telecom, part of Hrvatski Telekom (Croatia)	P	A
Di Air	Consumer services	Airlines	Podgorica	1997	Airline	P	A
Elektroprivreda Crne Gore	Utilities	Conventional electricity	Nikšić	1910	Power company	P	A
Jugopetrol Kotor	Oil & gas	Exploration & production	Kotor	1947	Petroleum	P	A
NLB Banka Podgorica	Financials	Banks	Podgorica	2021	Part of NLB Group (Slovenia)	P	A
Montenegro Airlines	Consumer services	Airlines	Podgorica	1994	Airline	P	D
mtel CG	Telecommunications	Mobile telecommunications	Podgorica	2007	Mobile	P	A
Niksic mine	Basic materials	General mining	Nikšić	1948	Bauxite mine	P	A
OKI Air International	Consumer services	Airlines	Podgorica	1993	Airline	P	A
Plantaže	Consumer goods	Distillers & vintners	Podgorica	1963	Winery	P	A
Pošta Crne Gore	Industrials	Delivery services	Podgorica	1841	Post	P	A
Prva banka Crne Gore	Financials	Banks	Podgorica	1901	Bank	P	A
Societe Generale bank Montenegro	Financials	Banks	Podgorica	1906	Bank	P	A
One Montenegro	Telecommunications	Mobile telecommunications	Podgorica	1996	Mobile operator	P	A
Trebjesa brewery	Consumer goods	Brewers	Nikšić	1896	Brands: Nikšićko pivo, Nik Gold, Nik Cool, Nikšićko tamno	P	A
VOLI	Consumer services	Food retailers & wholesalers	Podgorica	1995	Supermarkets	P	A

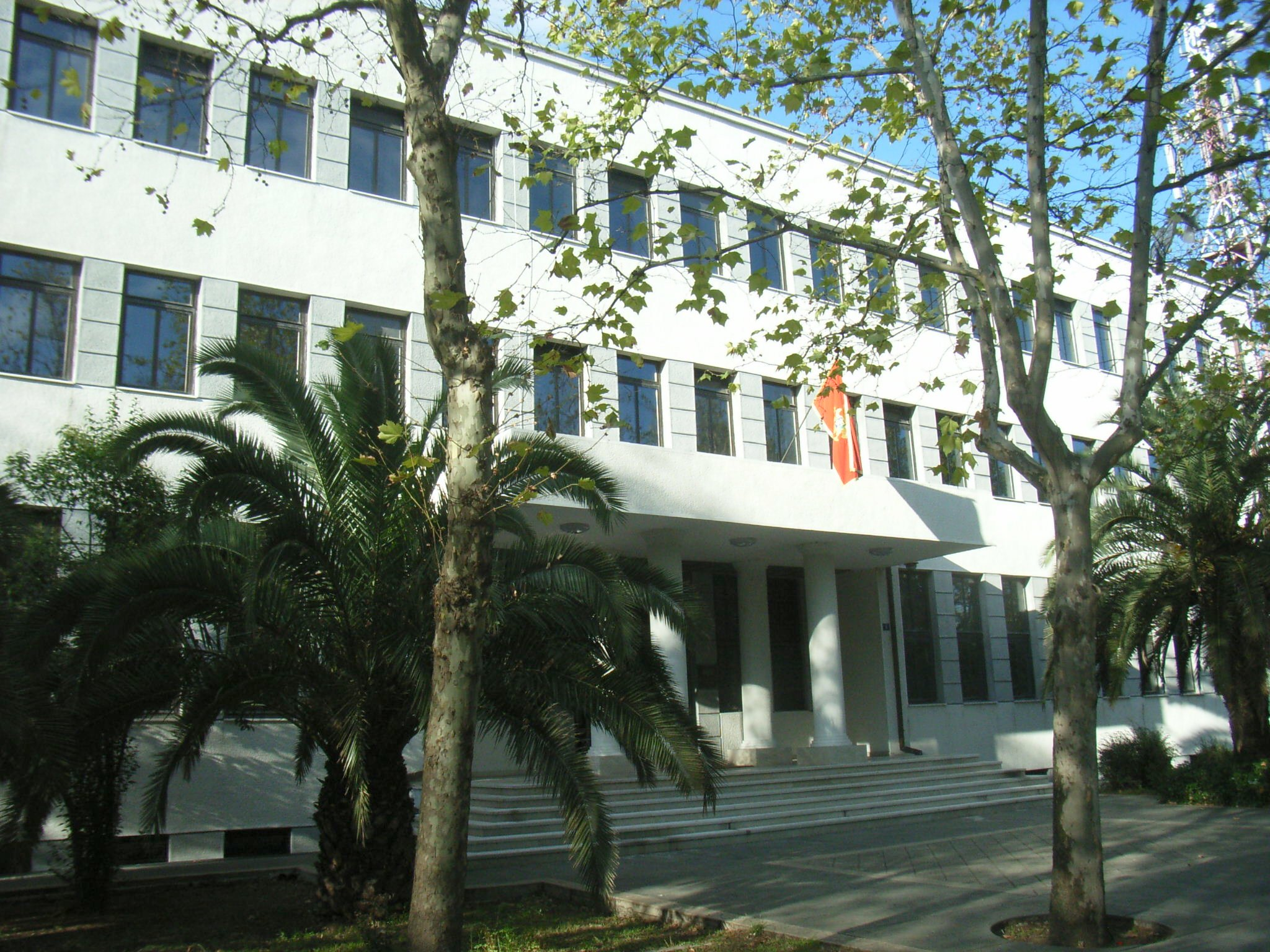
Central Bank of Montenegro.

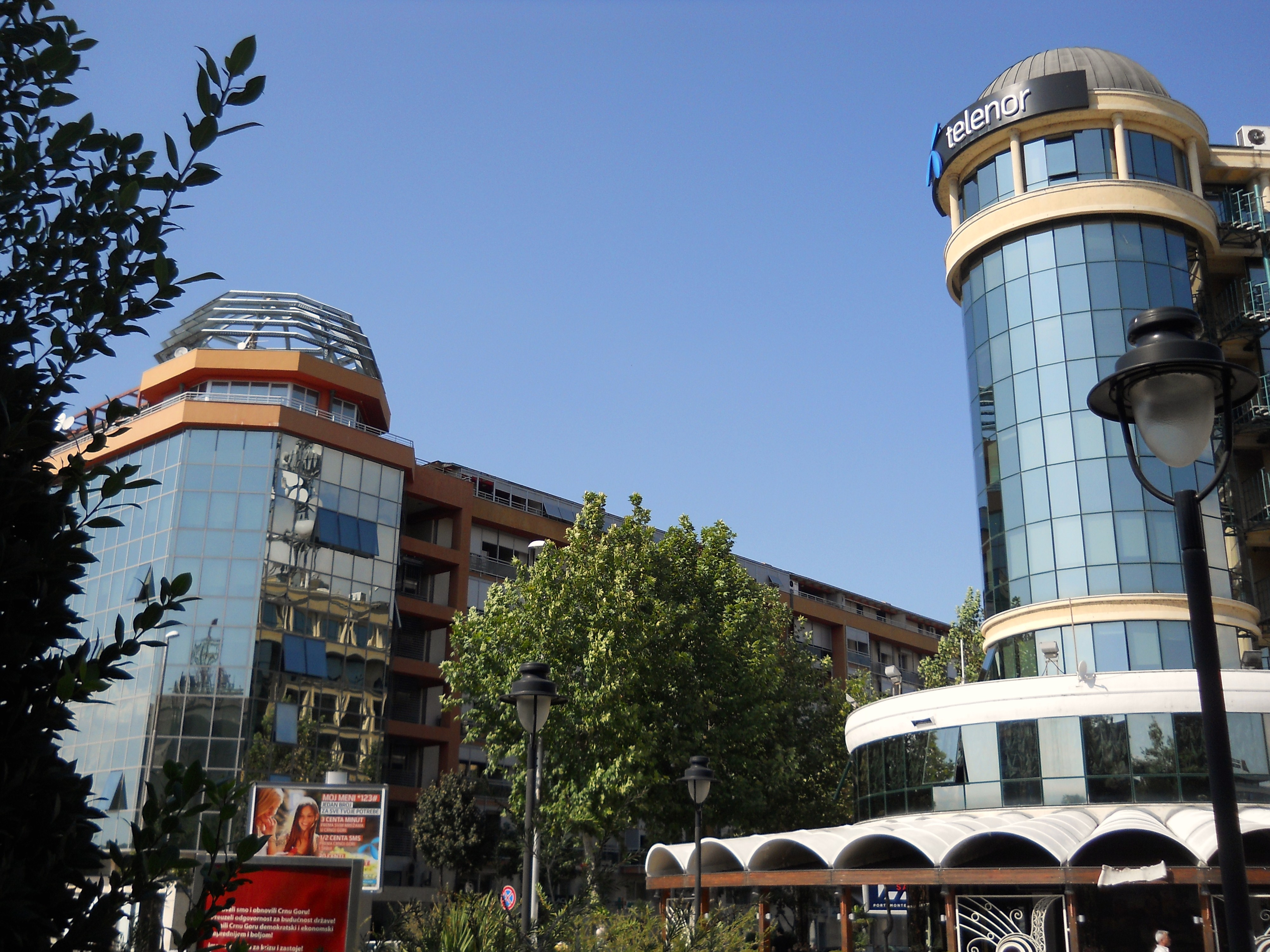
Telenor Podgorica.

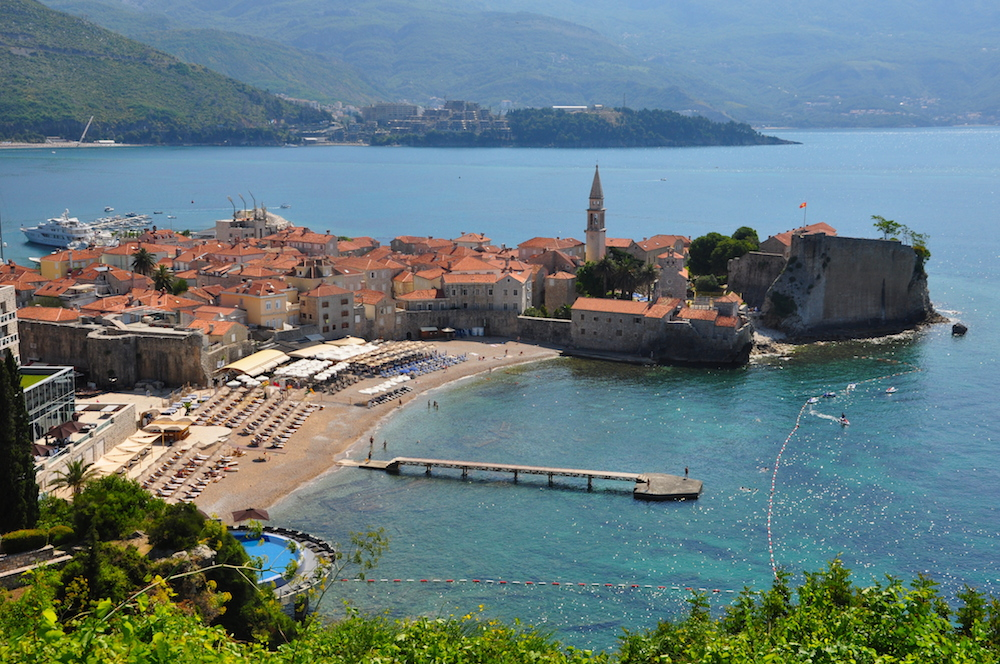
Budva is one of the main tourist destinations

== See also ==
- List of airlines of Montenegro
- List of banks in Montenegro
- List of supermarket chains in Montenegro
