= List of defunct airlines of Slovenia =

This is a list of defunct airlines of Slovenia.

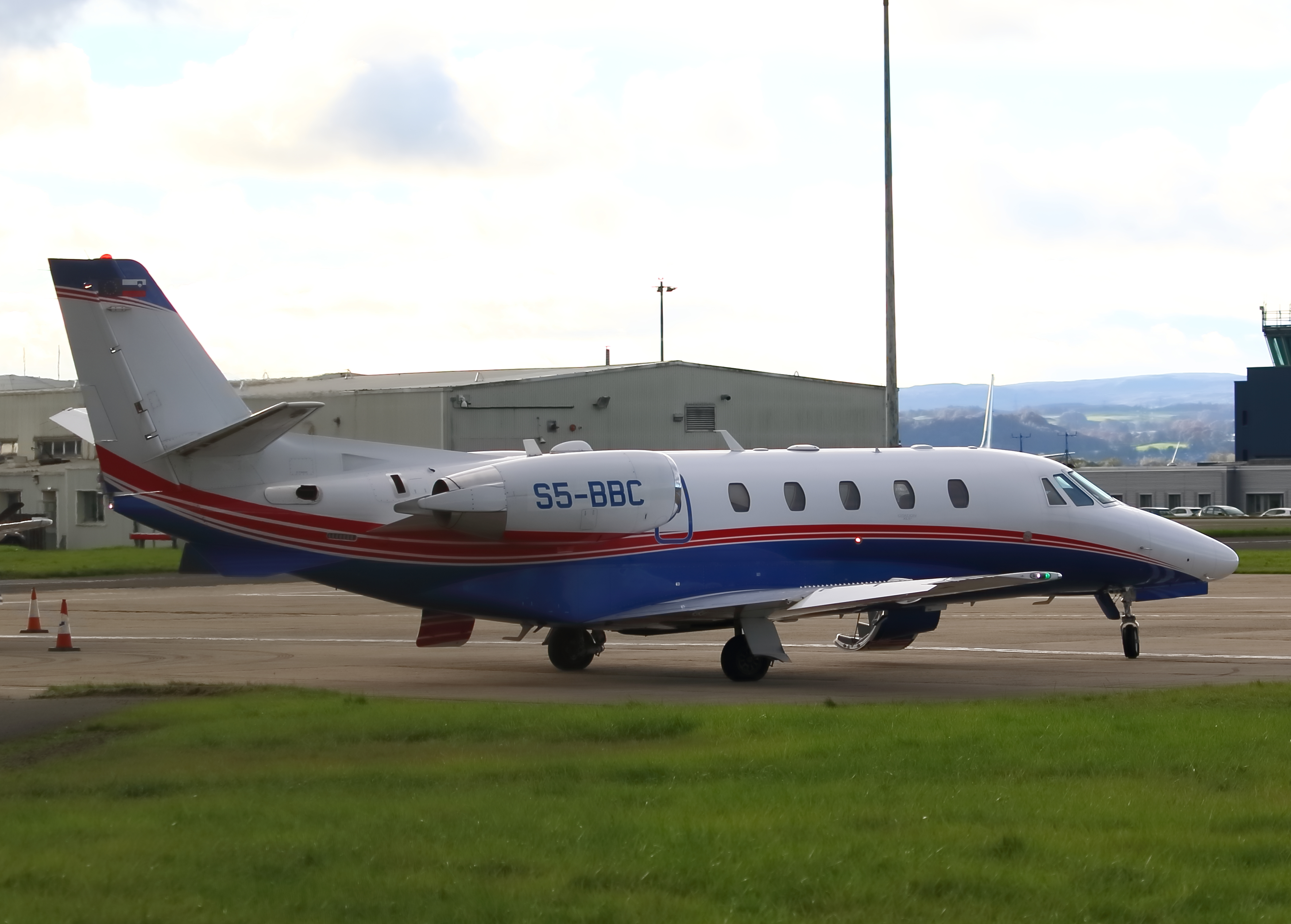
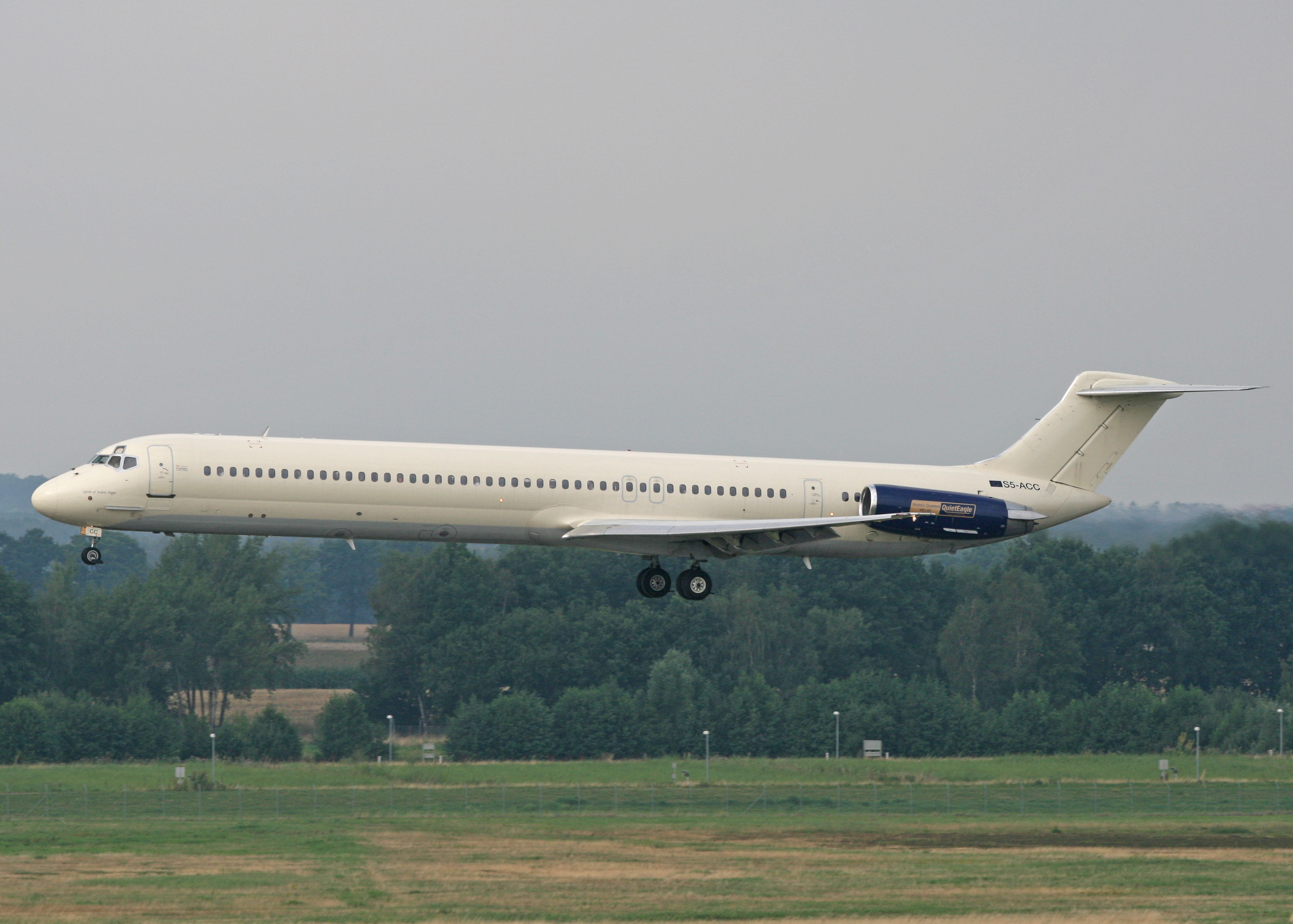
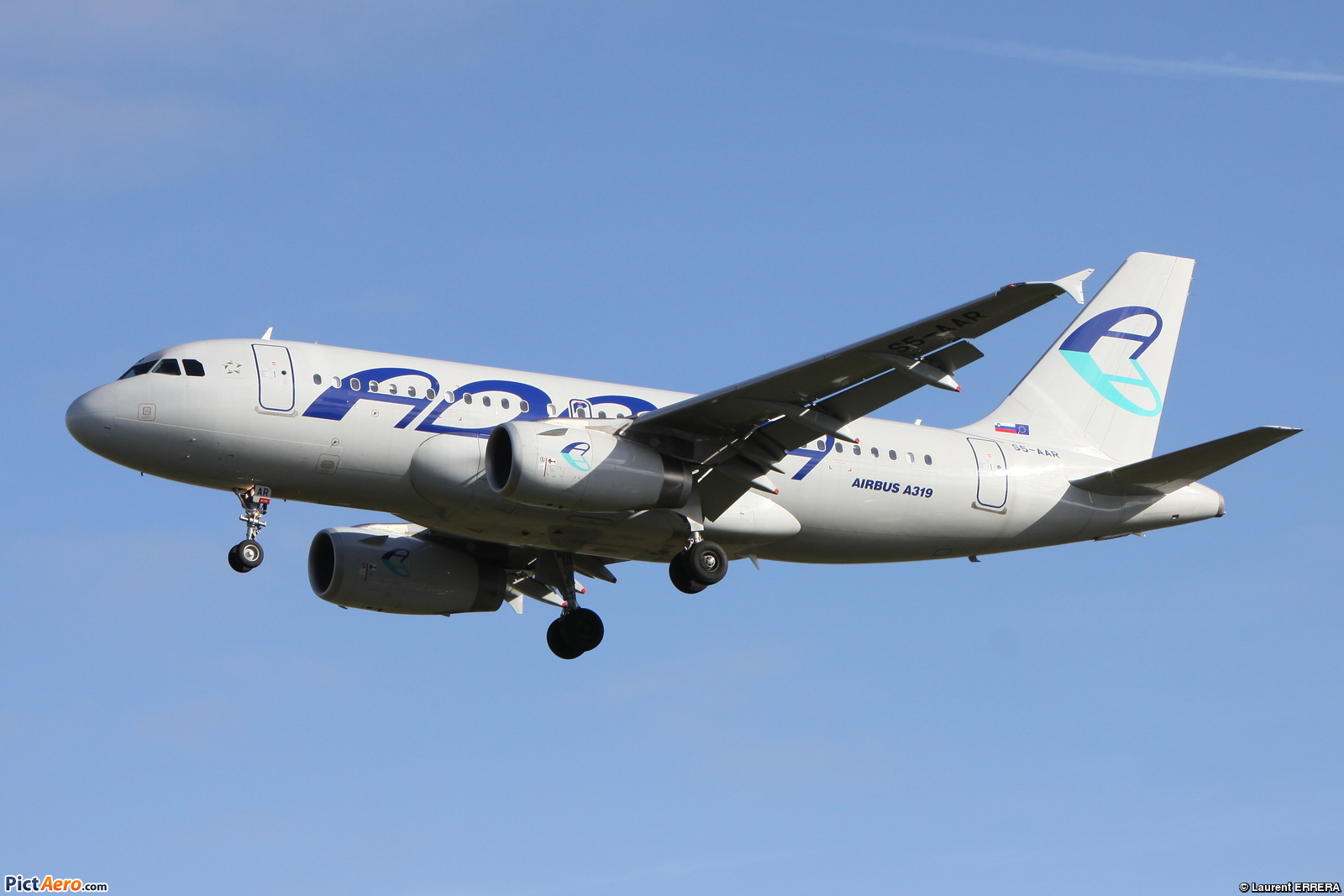
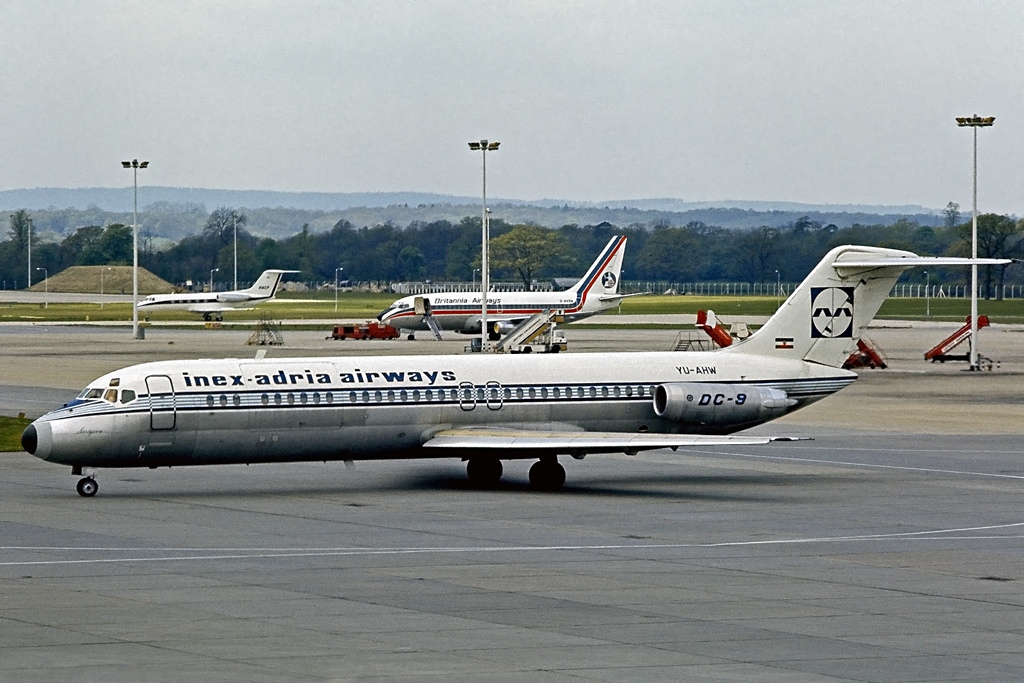
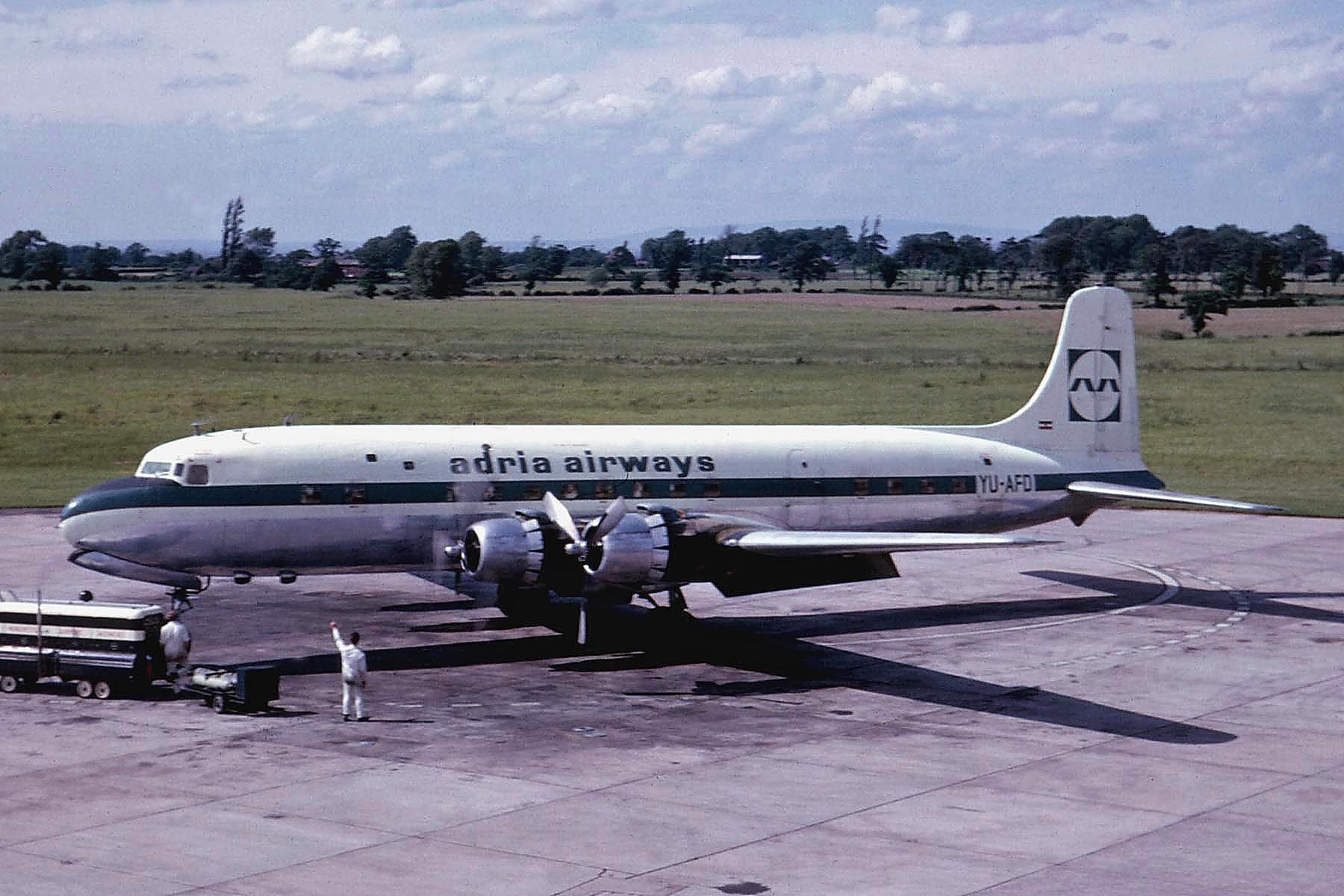
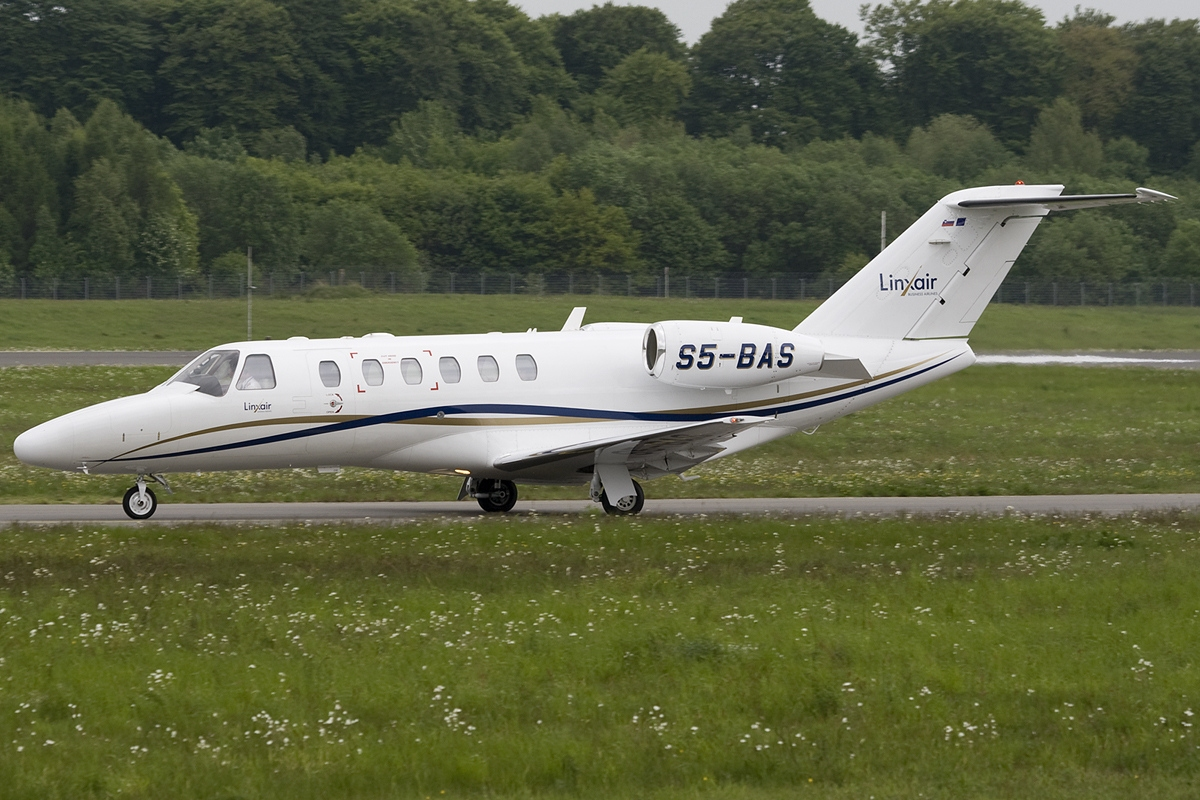
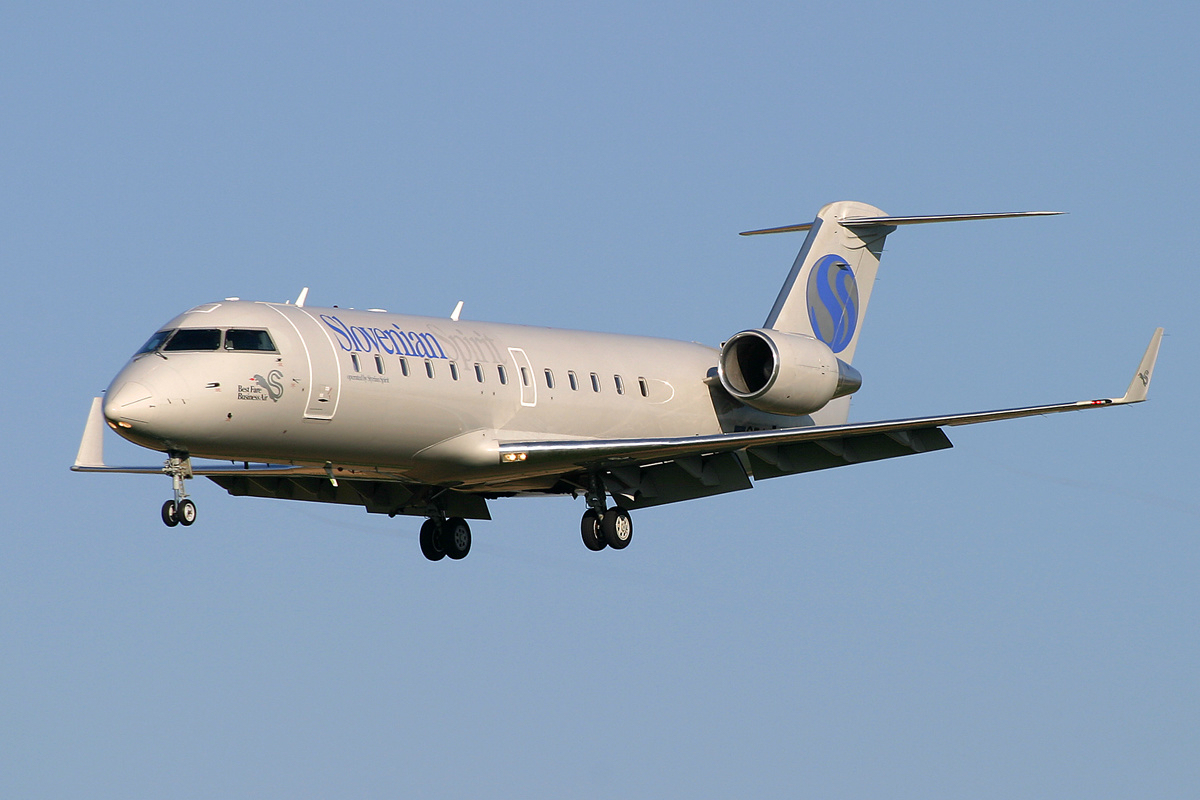
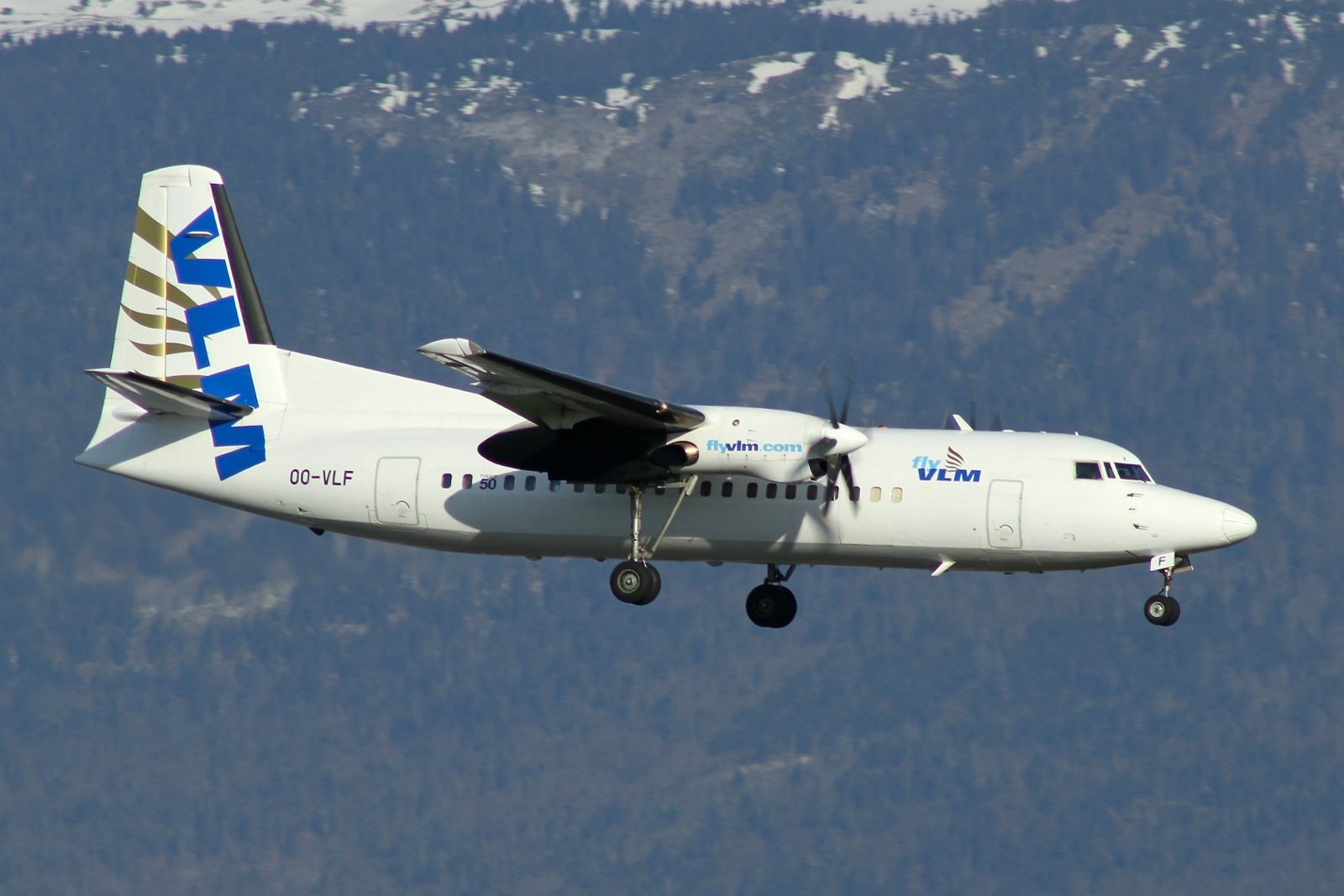
Airline	Image	IATA	ICAO	Callsign	Commenced operations	Ceased operations	Notes
Alpe Air			LPS		1999	2006
Alpavia					2022	2026
Aurora Airlines			URR	AIR AURORA	2005	2009
Express Airways			EPR	EMPEROR	1999	2016	AOC revoked
Golden Air					2011	2011
Adria Airways		JP	ADR	ADRIA	1986	2019	Went bankrupt
Inex Adria Airways		JP			1968	1986	Was Adria Airways from 1961-1968; rebranded as Inex-Adria Airways in 1968; rebranded as Adria Airways in 1986
Adria Aviopromet					1961	1968	In 1969 Adria Aviopromet merged with the Serbian company InterExport
Linxair			LIX		1999	2014	Business jet airline, went bankrupt
Slovenian Spirit		Z2	STY	SLOVENIAN	2004	2006
VLM Airlines Slovenia		VO	WLM	RIBICA	2017	2018

== See also ==
- List of airlines of Slovenia
- List of airports in Slovenia
- List of airlines of Yugoslavia
