= List of airlines of Montenegro =

List of airlines in Montenegro, grouped by type.

== Scheduled Airlines ==
| Airline | Image | ICAO | IATA | Callsign | Hub Airport(s) | Commenced Operation |
|---|---|---|---|---|---|---|
| Air Montenegro (formerly Montenegro Airlines) | | MNE | 4O | MOUNT EAGLE | Podgorica Airport | 2021 (1994) |

== Charter airlines ==
- Di Air (Podgorica Airport, Tivat Airport)
- OKI Air International (Podgorica Airport)
- Vektra Aviation (Podgorica Airport)

== See also ==
- List of airlines of Yugoslavia
