= Fly Air41 Airways =

Croatian airline

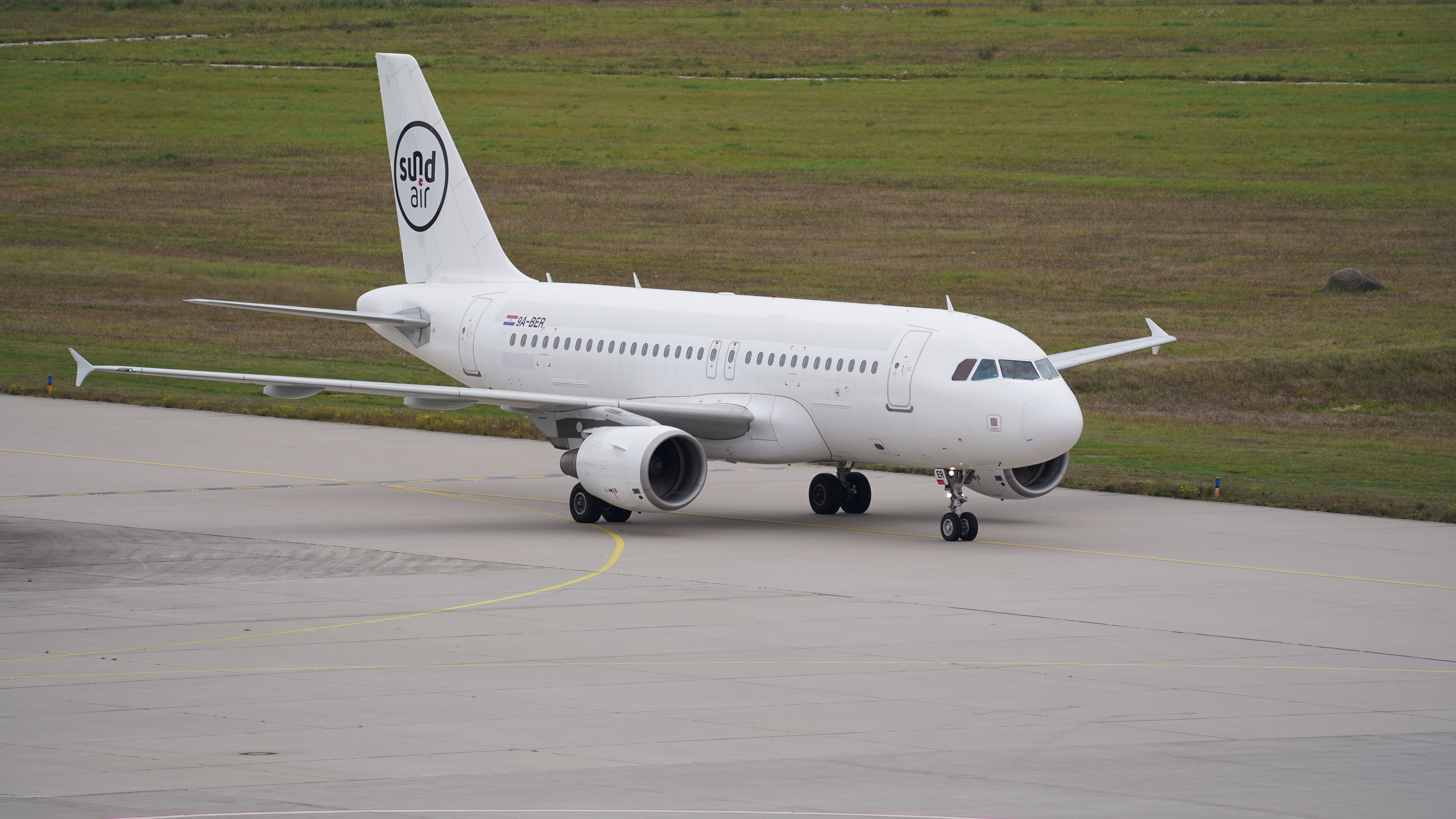
- Fly Air41 Airways Airbus A319‑100 operated by Sundair
IATA	ICAO	Call sign
–	BER	BERLIN
- Founded: 2021
- Commenced operations: 20 August 2021
- Fleet size: 7
- Destinations: ACMI/charter destinations in Europe (incl. Greece, Spain, Canary Islands, Madeira, Red Sea) and Condor‑operated routes
- Parent company: Schauinsland‑Reisen (via sister‑company Sundair)
- Headquarters: Zagreb, Croatia
- Key people: Branimir Vuković; Marcos Rossello
- Website: flyair41.com

Fly Air41 Airways is a Croatian ACMI and charter airline headquartered in Zagreb. Founded in 2021 as a sister company of Germany’s Sundair. It operates a fleet of six narrow body aircraft and holds IOSA certification since 2024. In the summer season, it operates select scheduled services for Condor from Düsseldorf and Frankfurt.

== History ==
Fly Air41 Airways received its Air Operator’s Certificate (AOC) from the Croatian Civil Aviation Agency on 18 August 2021 and commenced operations two days later, beginning flights for Sundair from Zagreb and Leipzig. Initially operating Airbus A319s, the carrier added two Airbus A320s shortly thereafter. By summer 2023, it had begun operating two Airbus A320 for Condor out of Düsseldorf to destinations in Greece and Spain. In 2024, the airline achieved IOSA certification.

== Corporate affairs ==
=== Ownership and structure ===
Fly Air41 is majority‑owned by German tour operator Schauinsland-Reisen and is a sister company to Sundair. While operating under its own Croatian AOC, it frequently leverages Sundair’s commercial relationships and bases.

=== Headquarters and operations ===
Fly Air41 Airways is headquartered in Zagreb, Croatia, where it also holds its Air Operator’s Certificate (AOC) issued by the Croatian Civil Aviation Agency. While Zagreb serves as the administrative center, the airline does not operate regular scheduled services under its own brand, instead functioning as an ACMI and charter provider for European carriers.

Operationally, Fly Air41 maintains seasonal and contract-based operating bases across Europe, depending on the partner airline it is serving at a given time.

For German partner airlines, primarily Condor and Sundair, from 2021 until now Fly Air41 has had its aircraft and crews based at several German airports, including:

- Bremen
- Dresden
- Düsseldorf
- Frankfurt
- Kassel
- Lübeck
- Berlin Branderburg
- Leipzig

During the summer 2024 season, the airline also operated on behalf of:

- Croatia Airlines, with flights based out of Zagreb
- Cyprus Airways, with aircraft based in Larnaca

In the winter 2024–2025 season, from October 2024 to April 2025, Fly Air41 provided ACMI operations for Aeroitalia, with active bases at:

- Rome Fiumicino
- Comiso
- Catania
- Lamezia Terme

== Destinations ==
Fly Air41 Airways provides long‑term and short‑term ACMI services and charter flights across Europe, notably to Mediterranean destinations, Canary Islands, Red Sea, and operates scheduled flights for Condor, especially in summer. Condor‑branded operations from Düsseldorf and Frankfurt serve mostly Greece and Spain, and as of 2025 summer season they include Portugal, Armenia and Cyprus as well.

== Fleet ==
=== Current fleet ===
As of July 2026, Fly Air41 Airways operates the following aircraft:

Aircraft	In service	Orders	Passengers
Airbus A319	4	—	
Airbus A320	3	—	
Total	7	—	

=== Former fleet ===
As of May 2025, Fly Air41 Airways operated six aircraft—four Airbus A319‑100s (144–150 seats) and two Airbus A320‑200s (180 seats)—with an average fleet age of approximately 15.5 years.

- Airbus A319‑100 – registrations 9A‑BER, 9A‑ZAG, 9A‑BWK, 9A‑MUC
- Airbus A320‑200 – registrations 9A‑IRM, 9A‑SHO

Two A320s (9A‑IRM, 9A‑SHO) were regularly deployed on Condor wet‑lease operations.

== Certifications ==
The airline received IOSA (IATA Operational Safety Audit) certification in 2024.

== Operations for Condor ==
Fly Air41 Airways began operating on behalf of Condor in the summer of 2023 under an ACMI (Aircraft, Crew, Maintenance, and Insurance) wet-lease agreement deploying two Airbus A320-200 aircraft to support Condor’s leisure network from Düsseldorf Airport. The cooperation continued into the 2024 and 2025, with Fly Air41 deploying two additional Airbus A319-100 from Frankfurt Airport in summer season 2025.

The aircraft, 9A‑IRM and 9A‑SHO, are painted in Condor’s branding style. The aircraft are crewed and maintained by Fly Air41 but operate under Condor’s flight numbers and booking system.

During the summer 2025 season (1 May to 25 October), Fly Air41 operates flights from Düsseldorf Airport and Frankfurt Airport to the following destinations on behalf of Condor:

=== Greece ===
- Chania
- Corfu
- Heraklion
- Kalamata
- Kavala
- Preveza
- Rhodes
- Samos
- Zakynthos

=== Spain ===
- Jerez de la Frontera
- Palma de Mallorca
- Tenerife
- Las Palmas
- Lanzarote

=== Cyprus ===
- Larnaca

=== Armenia ===
- Yerevan

=== Portugal ===
- Faro
- Madeira

=== Czech Republic ===
- Prague

Fly Air41’s operations for Condor are part of the German leisure carrier’s broader strategy to maintain network flexibility and reduce operational costs by outsourcing select short- and medium-haul services to partner airlines. The agreement allows Condor to scale up capacity during the peak holiday season without expanding its own fleet.

All flights operated by Fly Air41 for Condor depart from Düsseldorf and Frankfurt, Condor’s key bases for leisure operations alongside Munich. Onboard services, such as catering and passenger handling, adhere to Condor’s service standards.

== See also ==
- Sundair
- List of airlines of Croatia
