= List of airlines of Croatia =

This is a list of airlines which have an Air Operator Certificate issued by the Civil Aviation Authority of Croatia.

== Scheduled airlines ==
Airline	IATA	ICAO	Callsign	Image	Commenced operations	Hub airport(s)	Notes
Croatia Airlines	OU	CTN	CROATIA		1990	Zagreb Airport	Flag carrier

== Charter airlines ==
Airline	IATA	ICAO	Callsign	Image	Commenced operations	Hub airport(s)	Notes
Air Pannonia						Osijek Airport	Currently three Cessna 525A CJ2 in fleet
ETF Airways	LI	EZZ	ENTERPRIZE		2021	Zagreb Airport	Currently three Boeing 737-800 in fleet
Fly Air41 Airways		BER	BERLIN		2021		Currently four Airbus A319-100 and two Airbus A320-200 in fleet
Jung Sky		JSY				Zagreb Airport	Currently three Cessna 525A CJ2 in fleet
Trade Air	C3	TDR	TRADEAIR		1995	Zagreb Airport	Currently three Airbus A320-200, one Airbus A319-100, and one SAAB 340 in fleet

== See also ==
- List of defunct airlines of Croatia
- List of airlines of Europe
- List of defunct airlines of Europe
- List of airlines of Yugoslavia
