= Banja Luka International Airport =

Banja Luka International Airport Међународни аеродром Бања Лука Međunarodna zračna luka Banja Luka
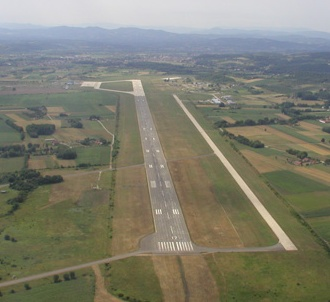
- IATA: BNX; ICAO: LQBK

Summary
- Airport type: Public
- Operator: Bosnia and Herzegovina Directorate of Civil Aviation (BHDCA)
- Serves: Banja Luka, Bosnia and Herzegovina
- Location: Mahovljani
- Elevation AMSL: 122 m (400 ft)
- Coordinates: 44°56′10″N 17°17′57″E
- Website: bnx.aero

Map
- Location of the airport in Bosnia and Herzegovina

Runways
Direction	Length		Surface
Direction	m	ft	Surface
17/35	2,500	8,202	Asphalt/Concrete

Statistics (2025)
- Passengers: 484,711 ▲7,7%
- Aircraft Movements: 4,244▼3,1%
- Freight (in tons): 23,8▲1,730,7%
- Source: Bosnian and Herzegovinian Directorate of Civil Aviation BHDCA

Banja Luka International Airport (IATA: BNX, ICAO: LQBK), also known as Mahovljani Airport, after the nearby village of the same name, is an airport located 18 km (11 mi) north northeast of the railway station in the city of Banja Luka, the second largest city in Bosnia and Herzegovina. The airport is managed by the government-owned company "Aerodromi Republike Srpske".

== History ==
The construction of the Banja Luka International Airport began in 1976. In accordance with the development plans, capacities were built defining Banja Luka as an airport of secondary importance, restricted to domestic air traffic on the territory of Socialist Federal Republic of Yugoslavia. After the Bosnian War, Republika Srpska was established with Banja Luka as the de facto capital. That gave Banja Luka Airport new importance and a completely different role. Banja Luka International Airport was opened for civilian air traffic on 18 November 1997. From 1999 to 2003 the airport served as the main hub of Air Srpska, which was the official flag carrier of Republika Srpska. The company was founded by Jat Airways and Government of Republika Srpska. The company ceased all operations in 2003 after increasing debt, and the withdrawal of Jat Airways from the partnership. There were plans for Sky Srpska, a state-owned airline founded in 2007, to start flights, however, the airline, which never had any aircraft, was closed in 2013. The airport's facilities were greatly improved in 2002 and 2003, ahead of the visit by Pope John Paul II to Banja Luka in June 2003.

On 15 December 2010, to celebrate the abolition of visa requirements for Bosnian citizens traveling to the Schengen Area countries, a symbolic charter flight was organised from Banja Luka to Brussels. In 2011, Banja Luka airport handled 8,367 passengers, a rise of 74% compared to 2010. Over the years, the airport has had flights connecting Banja Luka to Athens, Belgrade, Copenhagen, Frankfurt, Ljubljana, Salzburg, Tivat, and Vienna, partly thanks to Air Srpska which was an airline based at the airport. Austrian Airlines and Montenegro Airlines served Banja Luka during the late 1990s and early 2000s from their respective bases in Vienna and Tivat. Since Air Srpska stopped operations, the Government of Republika Srpska has tried to attract new airlines to fly to Banja Luka through various subsidies. Subsidised flights included Jat Airways flights to Belgrade between November 2007 and December 2009, operated with ATR 72, Austrojet flights to Salzburg and Tivat between July and December 2008, operated 3 times a week with Dash 8-100, and Adria Airways flights to Ljubljana between July 2010 and November 2011, operated 4 times a week with CRJ 200. B&H Airlines operated flights to Zürich for many years until airline went out of business in June 2015. BH Airlines operated seasonal charter flights to Tivat in Montenegro.

Passenger numbers more than doubled in 2014, as Air Serbia restarted flights to Belgrade, but suffered in 2015 due to BH Airlines' bankruptcy and the suspension of the Zurich route. Banja Luka airport owner Government of RS subsidises Air Serbia flights to Belgrade. In April 2018, Ryanair announced that it would start its first ever flight from Banja Luka (and Bosnia as a whole) with twice-weekly services to each of Brussels Charleroi and Memmingen, while in May, it added Stockholm Skavsta and, in December, Berlin-Schönefeld to its list of new routes. The flights began in October 2018. Overall, the airline expected 100,000 passengers in 2019. In April 2021, Wizz Air announced its arrival and launch of five routes from Banja Luka to Dortmund, Basel/Mulhouse, Eindhoven, Malmö and Stockholm Skavsta. In April 2026, Air Montenegro announced the relaunch of the Banja Luka - Tivat route after three years break.

== Airlines and destinations ==
The following airlines operate regular flights to and from Banja Luka:

Airlines	Destinations
Aegean Airlines	Seasonal charter: Athens
Air Cairo	Seasonal charter: Hurghada
Air Montenegro	Seasonal: Tivat
Air Serbia	Belgrade
Freebird Airlines	Seasonal charter: Antalya
Ryanair	Gothenburg, Karlsruhe/Baden-Baden, Memmingen, Stockholm–Arlanda, Vienna; Seasonal: Brussels-Charleroi
Tailwind Airlines	Seasonal charter: Antalya
Wizz Air	Basel/Mulhouse, Dortmund

== Statistics ==
Passenger statistics
Year/Month	Year total	Change
2025	484,711	▲7.7%
2024	399,174	▼13.4%
2023	460,720	▲34.3%
2022	342,988	▲157.5%
2021	139,886	▲188.2%
2020	43,775	▼70.7%
2019	149,693	▲313.7%
2018	36,180	▲73.3%
2017	20,867	▼3.8%
2016	21,694	▼4.9%
2015	22,800	▼17.5%
2014	27,636	▲212.7%
2013	8,837	▲37.6%
2012	6,424	▼23.2%
2011	8,367	▲74.4%
2010	4,798	

Passengers (in thousands) 2016–2026
Updated: 12 November 2026

=== Busiest operators ===
Busiest operators at Banja Luka Airport in 2023
Airline	Passengers	No of flights
Ryanair	236,947	1,706
Wizz Air	155,089	850
Air Serbia	10,135	210
Air Montenegro	3,009	-
Charter flights	26,622	248
Other flights	1,929	-

== Ground transportation ==
The airport was built in the area of Laktaši municipality, in a wide valley of the Vrbas expanding into Lijevče. It is connected to the Banja Luka – Gradiška and Laktaši – Doboj motorways.

== See also ==
- List of airports in Bosnia and Herzegovina
