= List of airlines of Slovenia =

This is a list of airlines currently operating in Slovenia.

== Charter airlines ==
Airline	Image	IATA	ICAO	Callsign	Commenced operations
Amelia International	Braunschweig Airport Aero4M Amelia International Embraer ERJ-145LU S5-ACJ (DSC06422)	8R	AIA	AMELIA	2019

== Cargo airlines ==
Airline	Image	IATA	ICAO	Callsign	Commenced operations
Solinair		ZS	SOP	SOLINAIR	1991
Lipican Aer		8I	LIP	LIPIZAN	2010

== See also ==
- List of airlines
- List of defunct airlines of Slovenia
- List of defunct airlines of Europe
- List of airlines of Yugoslavia
