= List of defunct airlines of Croatia =

This is a list of defunct airlines of Croatia.

Airline	Image	IATA	ICAO	Callsign	Commenced operations	Ceased operations	Notes
Adriatic Skyways				ADRIATIC SKY	2014	2015	
Adria Wings					2006	2007	Failed project. See Air Adriatic entry
Air Adriatic			AHR	ADRIATIC	2000	2007	
Air Adriatic Charter					2000	2001	Renamed Air Adriatic
Anic Airways		N3	ANR		1993	1996	Operated ATR 42
Air Croatia		J7	DNM		2013	2015	
Dalmatian Airlines					2005	2014	Never launched
Dubrovnik Airline		2D	DBK	DUBROVNIK AIR	2004	2011	Went bankrupt
European Coastal Airlines			ECB	COASTAL CLIPPER	2014	2016	
Istria Airlines					2007	2007	Never launched
Ivan Air			IVN	IVANAIR	1996	2001	
Laus Air			LSU	LAUS AIR	1999	2004	Operated Let L-410 Turbolet
Libertas Airways			DPT	LIBERTAS	2014		Never launched
Limitless Airways			LIM	LIMITLESS	2015	2016	
North Adria Aviation			NAI	NORTH ADRIA	1993	2006	Operated Let L-410 Turbolet
Sea Air					2015	2017	Operated leased Boeing 737-300, Embraer 145, Embraer 190
Zadal Airline					2006	2006	Never launched
Zagal - Zagreb Airlines					1989	1990	Renamed Croatia Airlines

== See also ==
- List of airlines of Croatia
- List of airports in Croatia
