= Sundair =

Charter airline in Germany

IATA	ICAO	Call sign
SR	SDR	SUNDAIR
- Founded: 2016; 10 years ago
- Commenced operations: 1 July 2017; 9 years ago
- Operating bases: Berlin Brandenburg; Bremen; Dresden
- Fleet size: 3
- Destinations: 23
- Parent company: Schauinsland Reisen
- Headquarters: Stralsund, Germany
- Key people: Marcos Rossello (CEO)
- Website: www.sundair.com

Sundair GmbH is a German charter airline headquartered in Stralsund. It operates flights to leisure destinations from its bases in Berlin, Bremen and Dresden.

== History ==
In September 2017, the airline received its air operator's certificate and commenced operations on 1 July 2017 with flights to Heraklion and Hurghada.

After the demise of Germania – an airline for which Sundair had previously operated wet-leases – in early 2019, Sundair announced it would base aircraft at Dresden Airport and Bremen Airport and take over several of Germania's routes.

In May 2023, German tour operator Schauinsland Reisen acquired a majority ownership in Sundair and its Croatian sister company FlyAir41, subsequently revising the airlines' corporate design. In August 2023, Sundair's CEO bought the Air Berlin brand.

In 2024, Sundair announced it would withdraw the aircraft it had based at Kassel Airport since 2017.

== Destinations ==
Sundair operates flights from Germany to holiday destinations in the Mediterranean and North Africa mainly from Berlin Brandenburg Airport, Bremen Airport and Dresden Airport. As of September 2021, the airline serves the following charter destinations:

Bulgaria

- Varna – Varna Airport
- Burgas – Burgas Airport

Croatia

- Bol – Brač Airport

Egypt

- Hurghada – Hurghada International Airport
- Marsa Alam – Marsa Alam International Airport

Germany

- Berlin – Berlin Brandenburg Airport base
- Bremen – Bremen Airport base
- Dresden – Dresden Airport base
- Hannover – Hannover Airport
- Kassel – Kassel Airport
- Lübeck – Lübeck Airport

Greece

- Corfu – Corfu Airport
- Kos – Kos Airport
- Rhodes – Rhodes Airport
- Heraklion – Heraklion International Airport
- Thessaloniki – Thessaloniki International Airport

Hungary

- Hévíz – Hévíz–Balaton Airport

Lebanon

- Beirut – Beirut–Rafic Hariri International Airport

Spain

- Fuerteventura – Fuerteventura Airport
- Mallorca – Palma de Mallorca Airport
- Gran Canaria – Gran Canaria Airport
- Tenerife – Tenerife South Airport

Syria

- Damascus – Damascus International Airport

Turkey

- Antalya – Antalya Airport

== Fleet ==
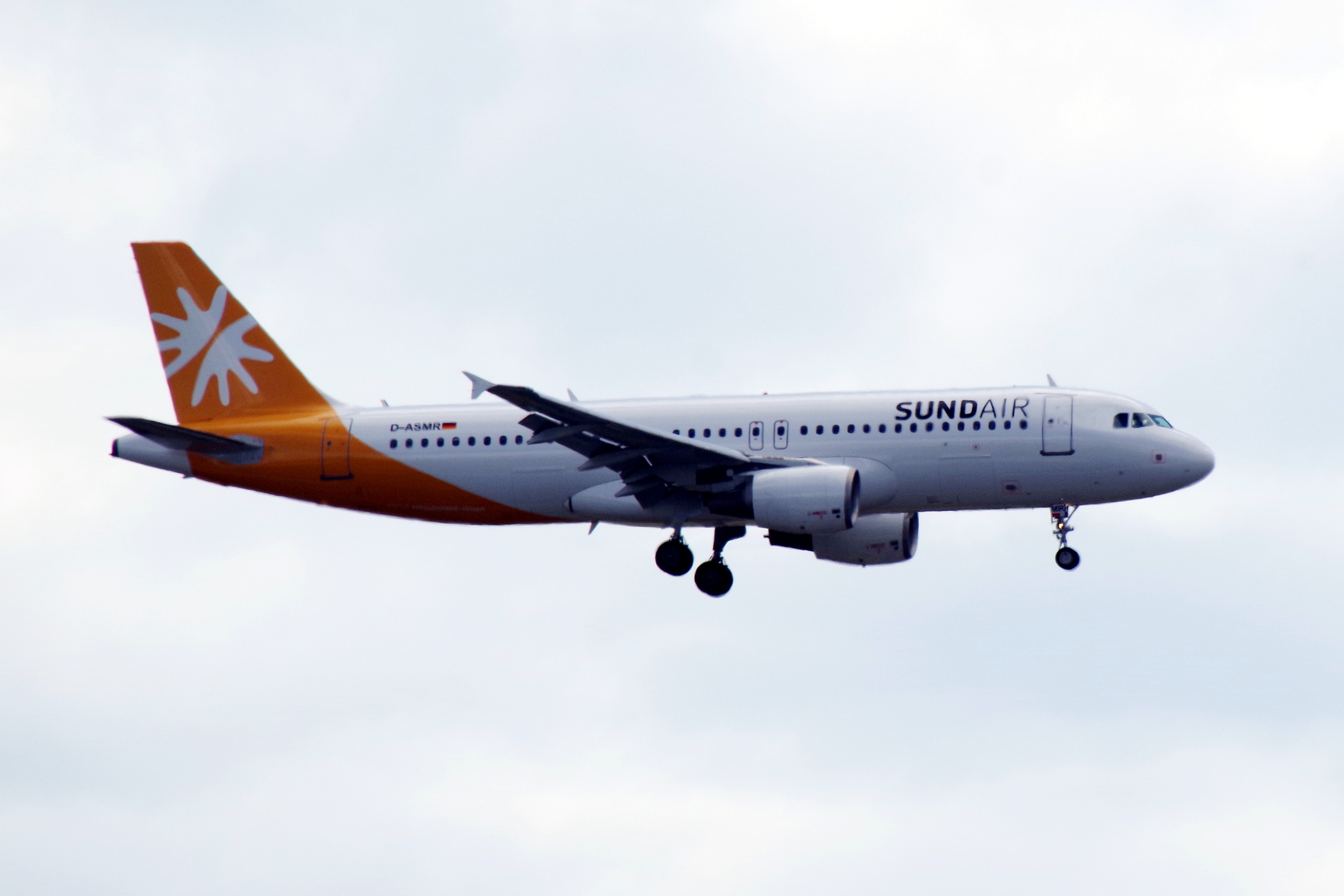
Sundair Airbus A320-200

=== Current fleet ===
As of July 2026, Sundair operates the following aircraft:

Sundair fleet
Aircraft	In service	Orders	Passengers	Notes
Airbus A320	3	–	180	
Total	3	–		

=== Former fleet ===
As of August 2025, Sundair operated two Airbus A319s and three Airbus A320s.
