= List of airlines of Bosnia and Herzegovina =

Airline list of Bosnian Airlines

This is a list of airlines currently operating in Bosnia and Herzegovina.

== Charter airlines ==
Airline	Image	IATA	ICAO	Callsign	Commenced operations
Icar Air			RAC	TUZLA AIR	2000

== See also ==
- List of defunct airlines of Bosnia and Herzegovina
- List of airlines of Yugoslavia
