= Pan Adria Airways =

Former Yugoslav airline, 1961–1978

- Founded: 1961
- Ceased operations: 1978
- Fleet size: 4
- Headquarters: Zagreb, Yugoslavia
- Employees: 134 (1971)

Pan Adria Airways (Serbo-Croatian: Aerotransportno Preduzeće JPTT / Аеротранспортно Предузеће ЈПТТ) was a Yugoslavian charter airliner based at Zagreb.

Pan Adria Airways was formed in 1961 by the Yugoslav Government as a domestic operator. It later operated night-mail flights as well as domestic and international passenger and cargo charter flights.

After the airline ceased operating the Yugoslav Government formed Trans Adria in 1978 to operate the Pan Adria routes.

== Fleet ==
The Pan Adria Airways fleet in 1974 consisted of

- 1 × Douglas DC-9-32
- 3 × Convair 440

The airline also operated a number of light aircraft for agricultural work.
