= Sky Bosnia =

Airline of Bosnia and Herzegovina

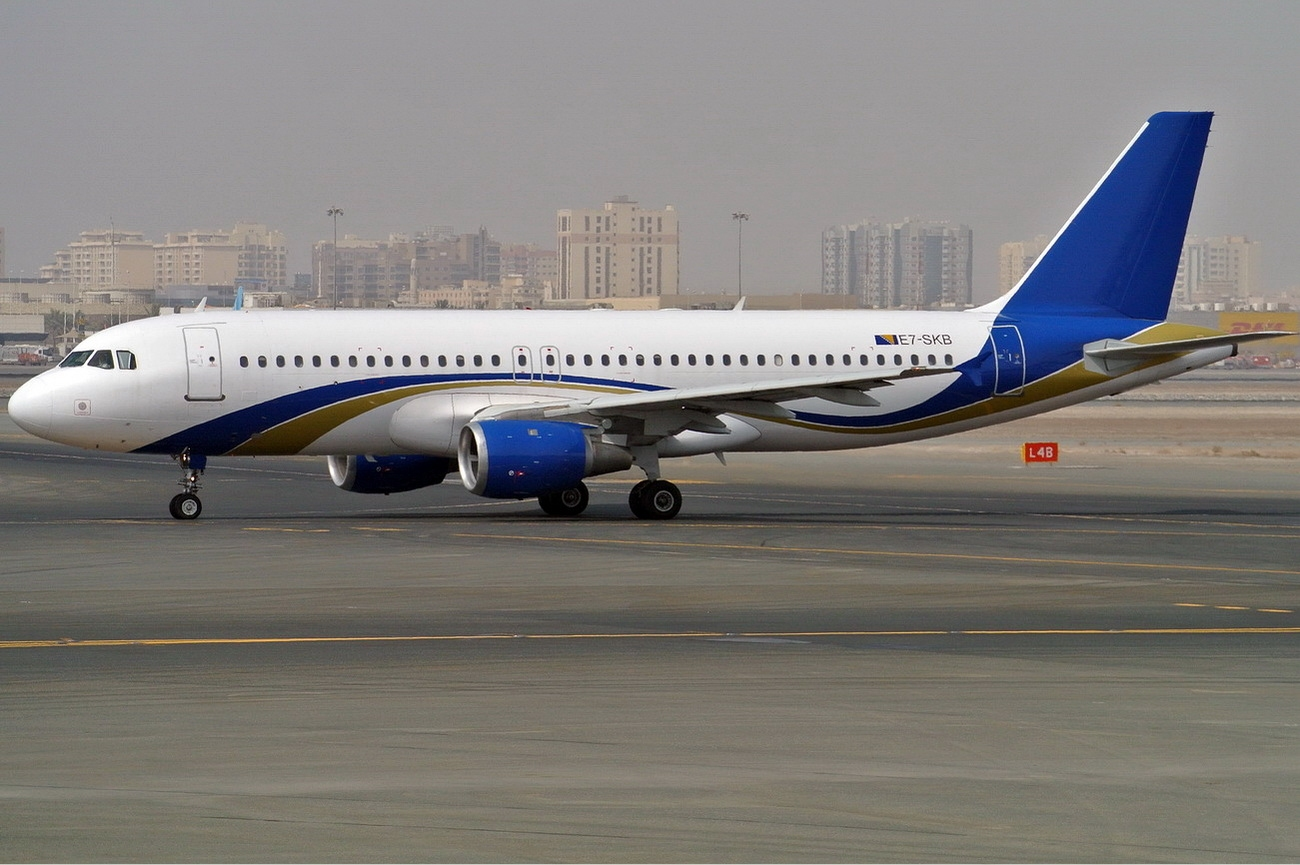
- Airbus A320
- Founded: 2011
- Commenced operations: 2012
- Hubs: Sarajevo International Airport
- Fleet size: 2
- Destinations: 2
- Headquarters: Sarajevo, Bosnia and Herzegovina

Sky Bosnia was an airline that operated from Bosnia and Herzegovina in 2011 until it ceased operations in 2012.

== History ==
Sky Bosnia was established on September 1, 2011 and operated from Bosnia and Herzegovina until 2012 with a single A320-200. Following a 3-month suspension from the Bosnia and Herzegovina Directorate of Civil Aviation in August 2012, all flights were stopped on 5 December of that same year.

== Fleet ==
The airline operated a total of two aircraft.

Aircraft	in service	Orders	notes
A320-200	2	0	
