= List of airlines of North Macedonia =

There are currently no operational airlines of North Macedonia.

== Defunct airlines ==
Airline	Image	IATA	ICAO	Callsign	Commenced operations	Ceased operations	Notes
Aeromak					2009	2009	Not launched
Air-Vardar			VDR		2003	2004	Not launched
Airlift Service		3I	LFM		2008	2011	
Avioimpex		M4	AXX	IMPEX	1999	2002	
Bosna Air			BAA		1992	1993	Renamed/merged to Vardar Bosna Air
Falcon Airlines		IO	FLO		1992	1993	
Interimpex-Avioimpex		M4	AXX	IMPEX	1992	1999	Renamed/merged to Avioimpex
Macedonia Air Service		M2	MDO		1992	1994	
MAT Airways		6F	MKD	MATAIRWAYS	2009	2011	
MAT Macedonian Airlines		IN	MAK	MAKAVIO	1994	2009	
Meta Aviotransport Macedonia Air Company		M5	MAM		1992	1994	
Palair		3D	PMK	PALAIR	1991	1996	
Star Airlines			STM		2008	2009	
Vardar Bosna Air		V7	BAA	VB Air	1993	1993	

== See also ==
- List of airlines
