= Air Adriatic =

Croatian charter airline

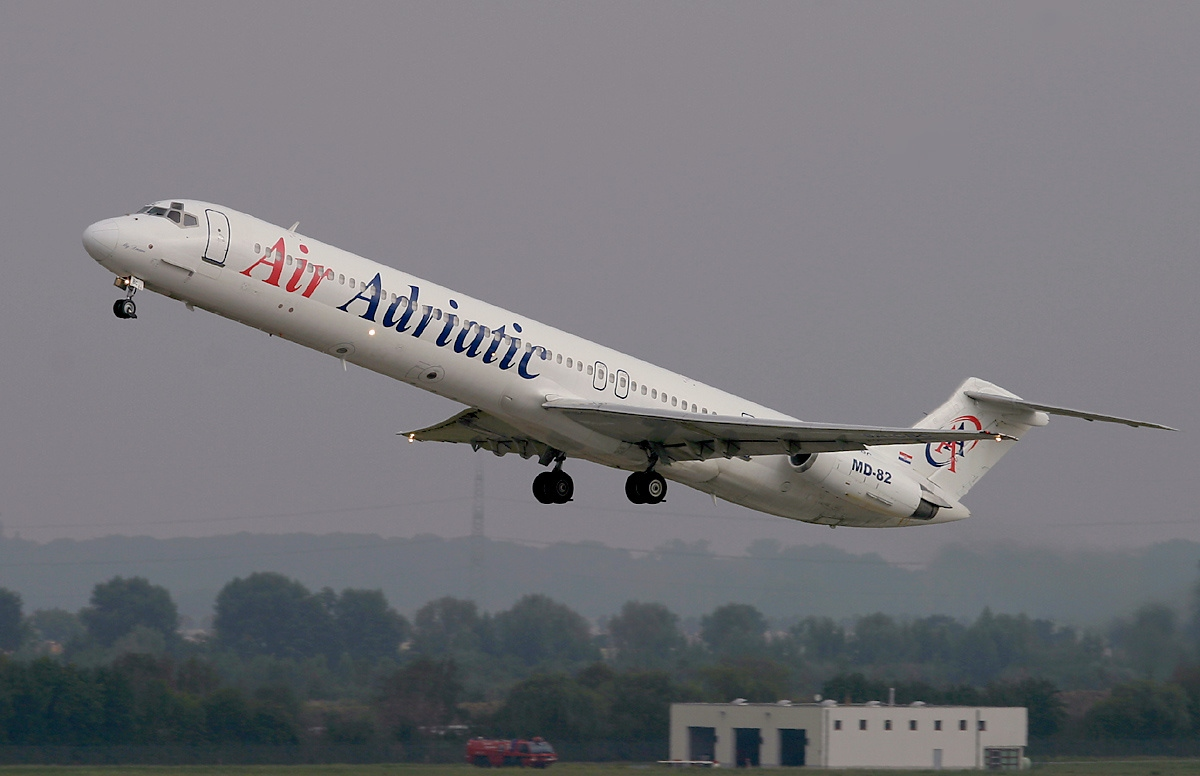
- McDonnell Douglas MD-82
IATA	ICAO	Call sign
—	AHR	ADRIATIC
- Founded: 2001
- Ceased operations: 2007
- Operating bases: Dubrovnik Airport; Pula Airport
- Fleet size: 4
- Headquarters: Rijeka, Croatia
- Key people: Marijan Tuskan
- Website: www.airadriatic.com (defunct)

Air Adriatic was a charter airline based in Rijeka, Croatia and was the first private Croatian airline. It operated charter services from northern Europe to Croatian holiday destinations. Its main bases were Pula Airport and Dubrovnik Airport. It ceased operations in March 2007 after it had lost its air operator certificate.

== History ==
Originally known as Air Adriatic Charter, the airline was established in October 2001 and started operations in March 2002.

It had its headquarters at Rijeka and technical operations based at Pula Airport. In 2004, charters were largely flown between Sweden and Croatia. In 2005, the company bought three additional used McDonnell Douglas MD-82 aircraft from Alitalia. In September 2006, the airline was planning to launch scheduled services and was considering adding Boeing 757-200s to its fleet.

Air Adriatic announced plans for 2007 to launch schedule services from Zagreb to Berlin, Düsseldorf, Malmö, Moscow, Pristina, Skopje and Zürich and to replace its McDonnell Douglas MD-82s with Boeing 737-700 aircraft. It also wet-leased one of its MD-82s to MyAir. Air Adriatic ceased operations in March 2007.

Adria Wings has been established by former Air Adriatic employees and was expected to resume charter operations with a single McDonnell Douglas MD-83 aircraft, but it folded before starting any service.

== Fleet ==
The airline previously operated:

- 1 McDonnell Douglas MD-83
