= Croatian Civil Aviation Agency =

Croatian Civil Aviation Authority
- Hrvatska agencija za civilno zrakoplovstvo
- Logo

Agency overview
- Formed: 20 April 2007; 19 years ago
- Jurisdiction: Croatia
- Headquarters: Buzinski krči 5, 10010 Zagreb, Croatia
- Agency executives: Ana Kapetanović, Director; Dejan Grahovac, Deputy Director
- Parent agency: National Airspace Management Commission
- Key document: Act on Amendments to the Air Traffic Act in 2007
- Website: www.ccaa.hr

The Croatian Civil Aviation Agency (CCAA, Croatian: Hrvatska agencija za civilno zrakoplovstvo) is the civil aviation agency of Croatia. Its head office is in Zagreb.

The Agency was founded under Act on Amendments to the Air Traffic Act in 2007 It began with its operation on 9th of March 2009.

The founding organisation of the Agency is the Republic of Croatia, with Government of the Republic of Croatia holding the founding rights pursuant to the afore-mentioned Act. The agency is an independent and non-profit legal entity which conducts activities in the interest of the Republic of Croatia within the scope defined in the Air Traffic Act and Statute of the Agency. The Agency reports to the Government of the Republic of Croatia by submitting Annual Work Report.
