= Linxair =

Slovenian business charter airline

IATA	ICAO	Call sign
-	LIX	-
- Founded: 1999
- Ceased operations: 2014 (bankruptcy)
- Hubs: Ljubljana Jože Pučnik Airport
- Secondary hubs: Moscow, Trieste, Zagreb
- Fleet size: 8
- Destinations: Europe, Africa, Asia
- Headquarters: Slovenj Gradec, Slovenia
- Key people: Niki Mušić CEO (until 2014); Barbara Podlogar CEO (2014)

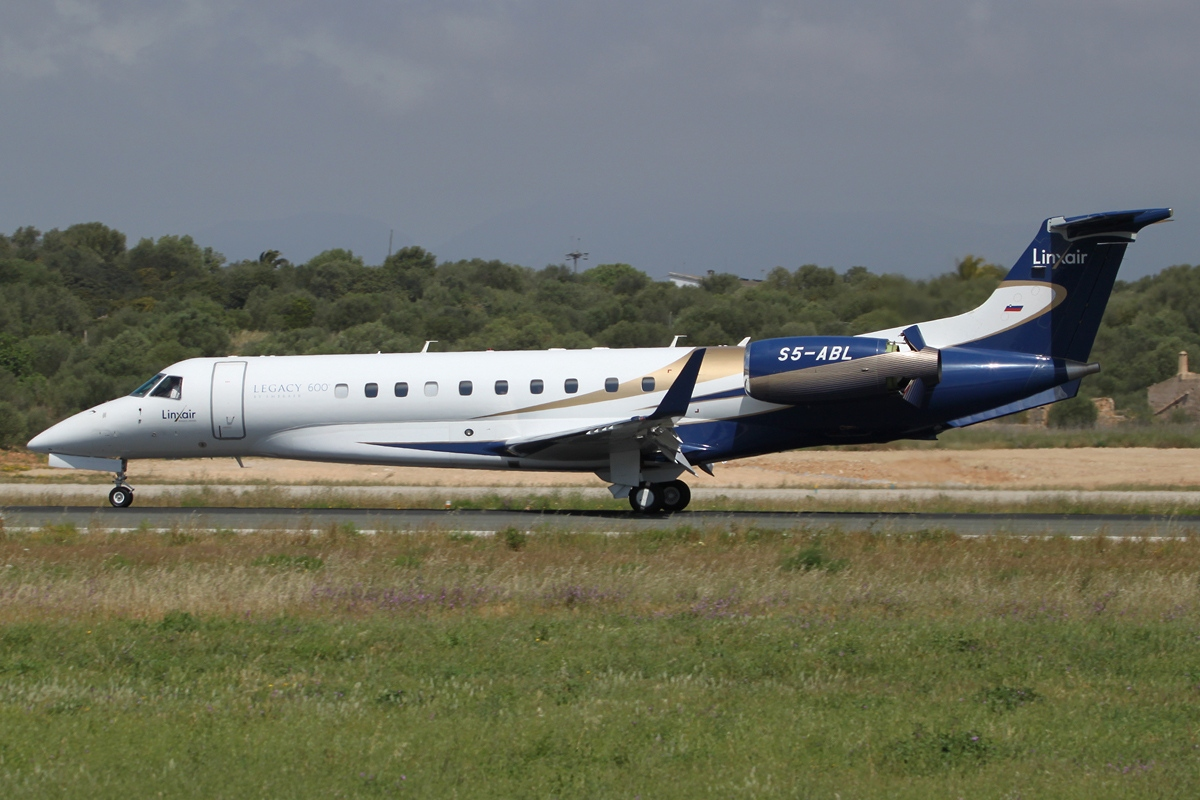
Linxair Embraer ERJ-135BJ Legacy 600

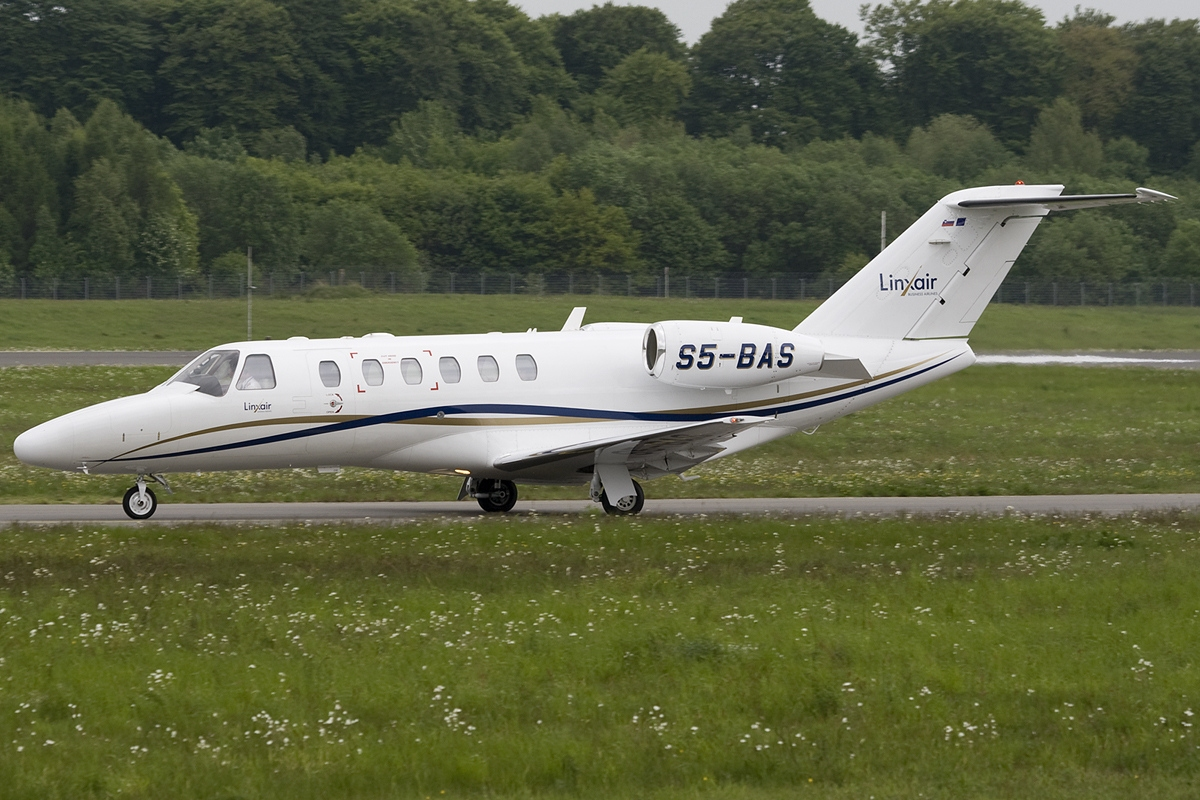
Linxair Cessna 525A CitationJet 2

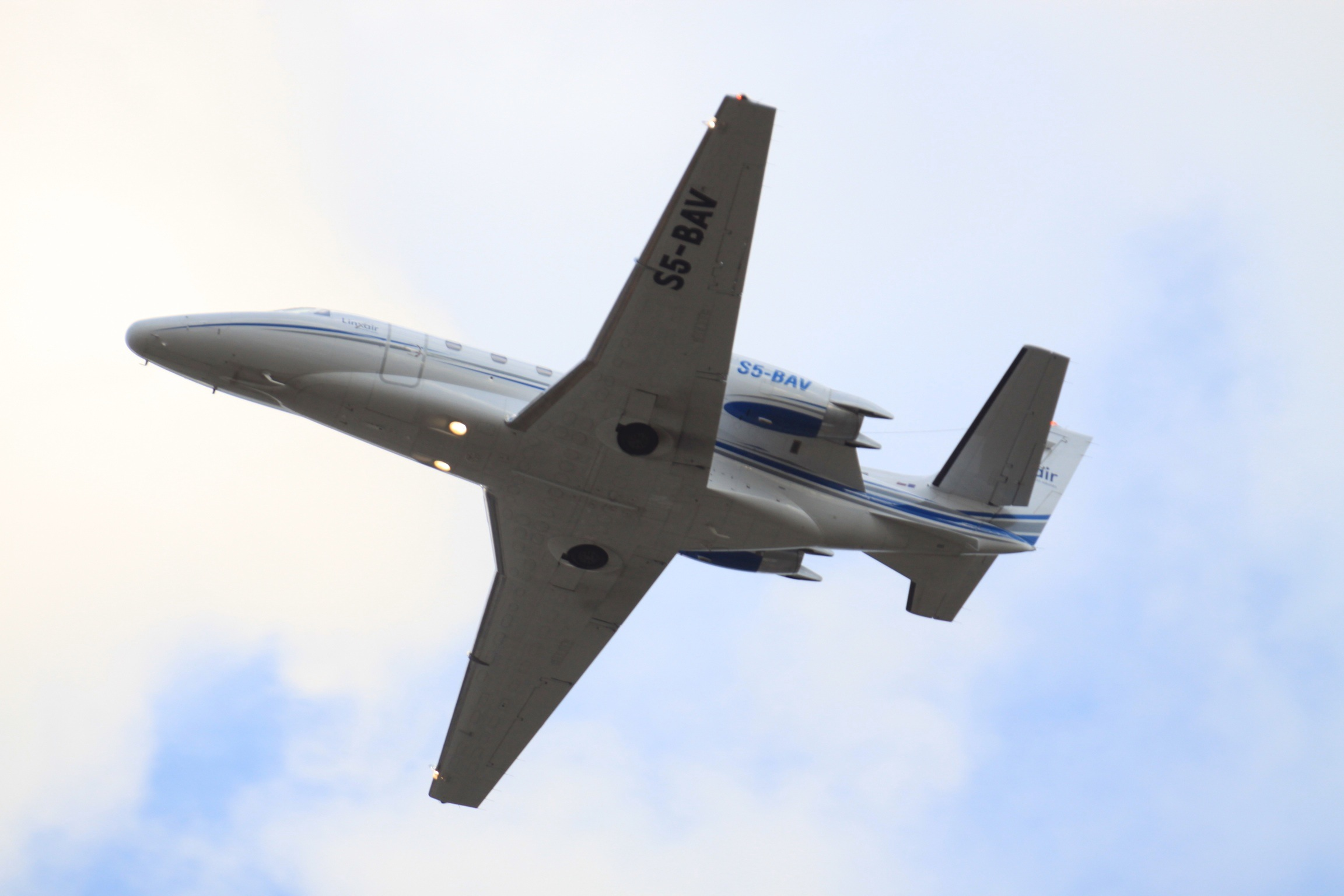
Linxair Cessna Citation Excel

Linxair was a business airline based in Slovenia. It was established and started operations in 1999 at its base, Ljubljana Jože Pučnik Airport (LJU). Linxair was the fastest-growing aviation company in Slovenian history and the biggest business aviation operator in the area of former Yugoslavia. Due to financial difficulties which started in 2009, the company declared bankruptcy in 2014. Shortly before bankruptcy, the company headquarters were moved from Ljubljana to Slovenj Gradec. A small part of the fleet continued operation under another operator, SiAvia. (Note: Allegedly, the Embraer Legacy 600 aircraft with the tail number RA-02795 was operated by Linxair from October 2007 until September 2015 when it was transferred to the Austrian airline International Jet Management and, then, in 2017, the aircraft was transferred to MNG Jet (Türkiye) and, in 2018, it was transferred to the Moscow based Autolex Transport and finally, in September 2020, it was owned by MNT-Aero LLC and operated by the Wagner Group.)

== Fleet (1999 - 2013) ==
- Piper PA-46-350P Malibu Mirage (from 1999 - 2004)
- Piper PA-46T JetProp Malibu (2001 - 2006)
- Cessna 525 CitationJet (2004 - 2007)
- Cessna 525 CitationJet1 (2007 - 2013)
- Cessna 525A CitationJet2+ (2007 - 2010)
- Cessna 525A CitationJet2+ (2008 - 2013)
- Cessna 525B CitationJet3 (2007 - 2012)
- Cessna 560XL Citation Excel (2005 - 2013)
- Cessna 560XL Citation Excel (2011 - 2012)
- Cessna 560XL Citation XLS (2007 - 2013)
- Embraer 135BJ Legacy 600 (2007 - 2012)
- Embraer 135BJ Legacy 600 (2008 - 2012)
- Embraer 145 ERJ (2011 - 2012)
- Embraer 145 ERJ (2012)
