= B&H Airlines =

Flag carrier of Bosnia and Herzegovina (1994–2015)

Coordinates: 30.9178°N 29.6964°E

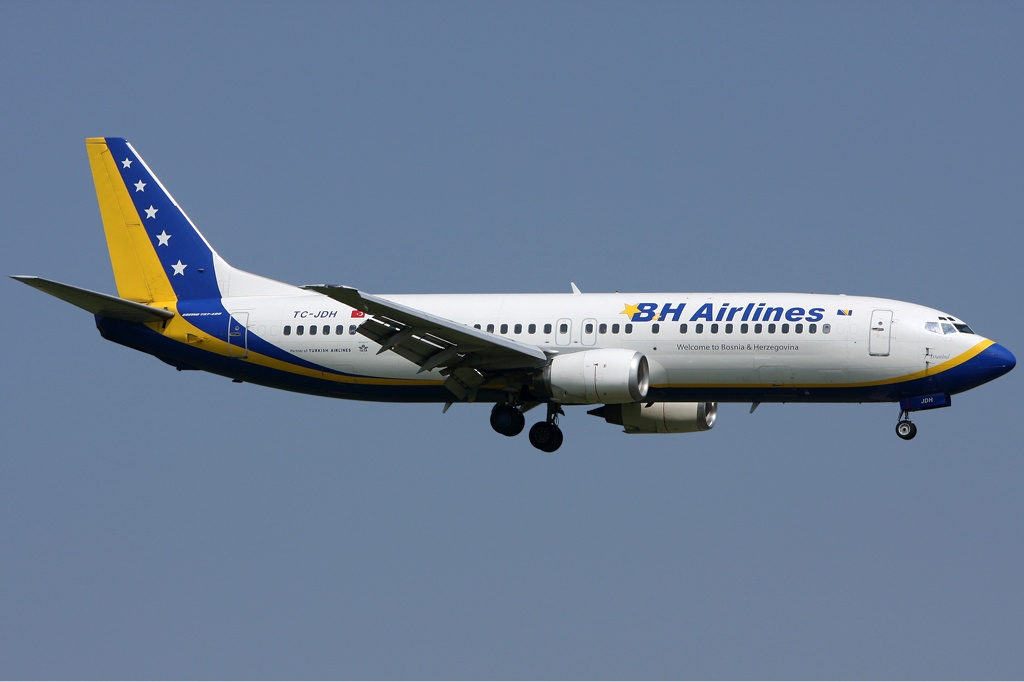
- Boeing 737-400
IATA	ICAO	Call sign
JA	BON	BH AIRLINES
- Founded: May 1994 (as Air Bosna)
- Ceased operations: 2 July 2015
- Hubs: Sarajevo International Airport
- Fleet size: 1 (as at time of closure)
- Destinations: 3
- Parent company: Government of the Federation of Bosnia and Herzegovina (99.93%)
- Headquarters: Sarajevo, Bosnia and Herzegovina
- Key people: Amir Jažić, CEO
- Website: bhairlines.ba

B&H Airlines d.o.o. was the flag carrier of Bosnia and Herzegovina with its headquarters in Sarajevo. It operated scheduled and charter passenger services, as well as small parcel services, from its base at Sarajevo International Airport. It ceased operations in June 2015.

== History ==
=== Early years ===
Air Bosna logo

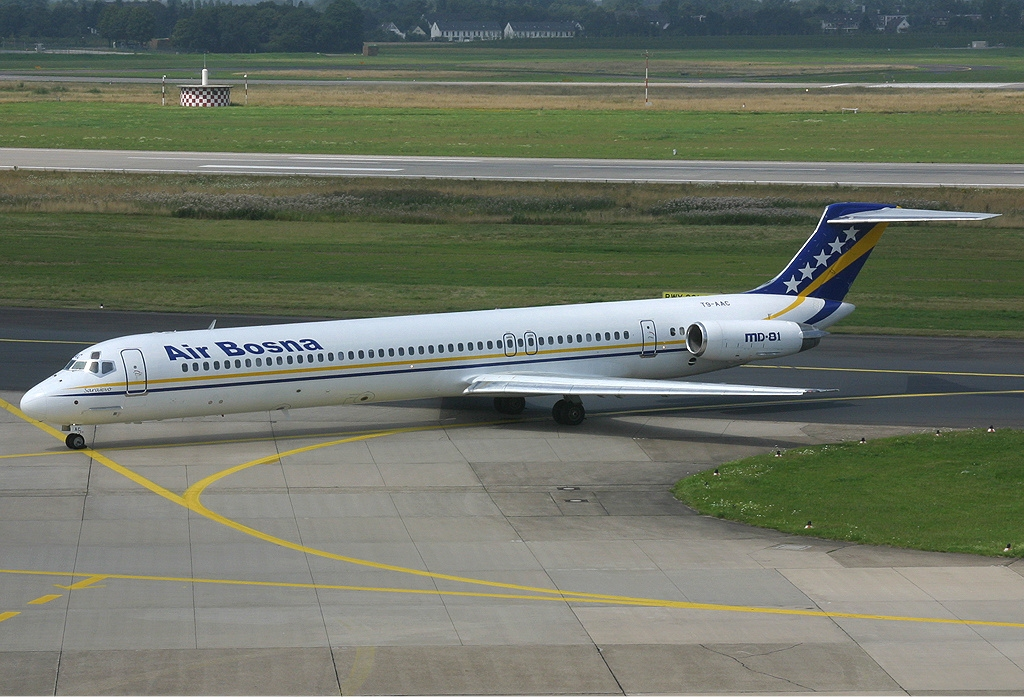
Air Bosna McDonnell Douglas MD-80 in 2002

The airline was founded as Air Bosna in May 1994 and officially registered on 12 August. The carrier initially experienced great difficulties because of the nation's tumultuous political situation. Flight operations began two years later, on 15 August 1996, using ad hoc leased aircraft. Regularly scheduled flights were launched on 19 February of the following year and stabilized after the Paris political agreements in December.

In September 2003, the airline ceased all operations due to its inability to repay its debts. It remained idle until May 2004, when the Government of the Federation of Bosnia and Herzegovina promised to revive it. In June 2005, it restarted operations, operating a pair of leased ATR-72 aircraft. Scheduled flights were restarted one month later.

Exactly a year later, its corporate name was changed to B&H Airlines. In late 2007, the Bosnian government announced it would sell its shares in the airline. On 23 February 2008, it was reported that Turkish Airlines was in negotiations to buy the airline, and on 30 March 2008, Croatia Airlines was also reported to be interested in a stake. The government of the Federation of Bosnia and Herzegovina also invited Comintel and MyAir (in addition to Turkish Airlines and Croatia Airlines) to recapitalise the airline.

Bids were received from Turkish Airlines, Malaysia's Comintel Corporation and a Jordanian consortium, which included Royal Jordanian. On 29 October 2008, the Bosnian government announced that Turkish Airlines had been picked as the best bidder in an auction for B&H Airlines shares. Turkish Airlines proposed to sub-lease B&H Airlines two Boeing aircraft, if requested by the airline, and in return for 49% of the shares of the company, covered the lease payments of the Boeing aircraft and participated in capital increase decisions. However, in June 2012, Turkish Airlines ended the joint venture following which the government of Bosnia and Herzegovina gave the airline a cash injection of €3.5 million.

=== Developments since 2012 ===
By mid-2012, the airline was jointly owned by the government of the Federation of Bosnia and Herzegovina (99.93%) and Energoinvest (0.07%), after the government's purchase of a former joint stake by Turkish Airlines (49%). In April 2013, the airline had to cancel flights when its only airworthy ATR-72 was withdrawn for maintenance. Its other ATR-72 had previously been grounded for similar reasons.

In June 2015, the Federation government decided to liquidate the carrier. The Federal Minister for Transport and Communication, Denis Lasić, said the best option would be for the airline to declare bankruptcy. "They [B&H Airlines] have eaten up everything they had and now they are in a situation where they must redirect all state funding to HETA". B&H has some eight million euros worth of debt owed to HETA, the asset management company, for the financial lease of its two ATR 72s. The Minister added, "I have held talks with the Prime Minister Fadil Novalić and the conclusion is to liquidate the carrier." B&H Airlines owed the airport of Sarajevo over 3,5 million Euros and the lessor of their aircraft over 7,5 million Euros. The total debt was over 17 million US-Dollars at the time of closure.

The airline flew its final commercial service on 11 June 2015. The company's Air operator's certificate was revoked on 2 July 2015.

== Destinations ==
As of March 2015, B&H Airlines operated scheduled flights to the following destinations:

Bosnia and Herzegovina

- Sarajevo - Sarajevo International Airport base
- Banja Luka - Banja Luka International Airport

Switzerland

- Zürich - Zürich Airport

== Fleet ==
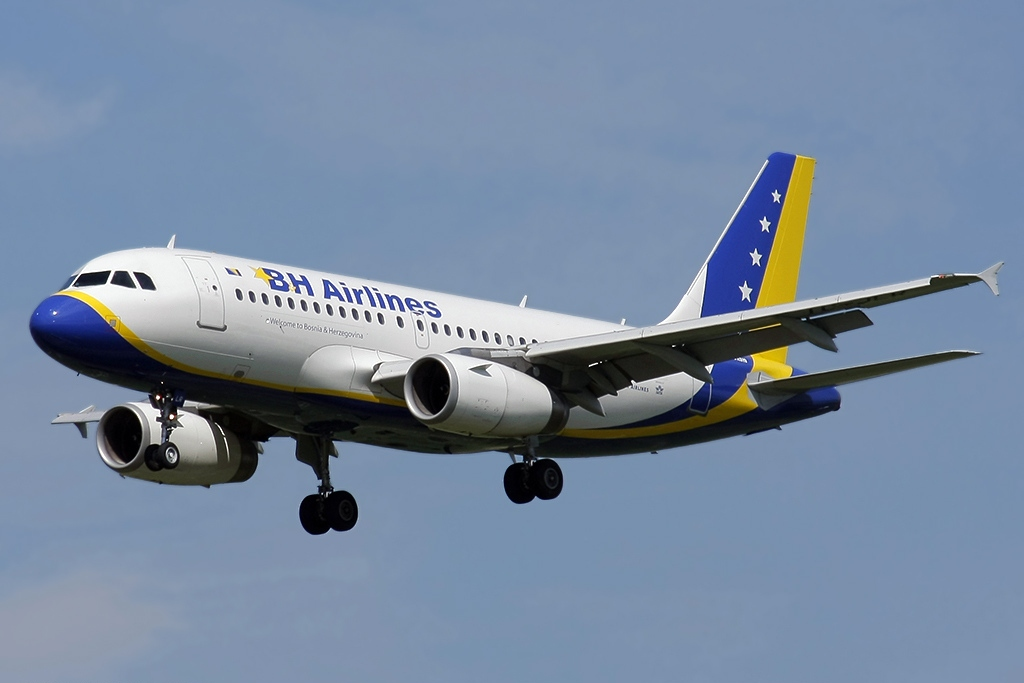
Airbus A319-100

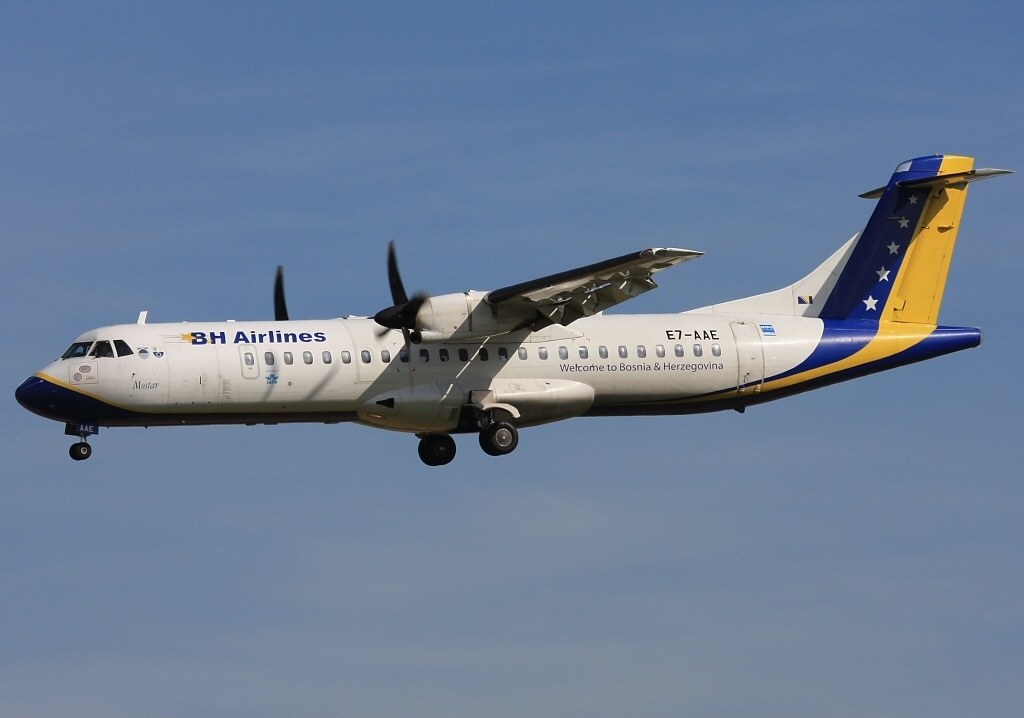
ATR 72-200

Previously, B&H Airlines operated the following aircraft:

- Airbus A319-100
- ATR 72-200
- Boeing 737-200
- Boeing 737-400
- CASA C-212 Aviocar
- Fokker 50
- McDonnell Douglas MD-80
- Yakovlev Yak-42
- Piper Seneca II

== Statistics ==
Passenger numbers
2005	2006	2007	2008	2009	2010	2011	2012	2013	2014	2015 Q1
24,906	59,792	68,222	61,904	87,158	138,241	129,435	59,697	31,705	35,606	3,604
	▲140.1%	▲14.1%	▼9.2%	▲40.8%	▲58.6%	▼6.7%	▼53.6%	▼46.9%	▲12.3%	▼42.3%

== See also ==
- Sarajevo International Airport
- Banja Luka International Airport
- List of airports in Bosnia and Herzegovina
- Turkish Airlines
