= Sky Srpska =

Airline project of Bosnia and Herzegovina

IATA	ICAO	Call sign
-	-	-
- Founded: 2007
- Ceased operations: 2011
- Hubs: Banja Luka International Airport
- Fleet size: 0
- Destinations: 0
- Headquarters: Banja Luka, Bosnia and Herzegovina
- Website: www.skysrpska.aero

Sky Srpska was a planned airline in the Republika Srpska, Bosnia and Herzegovina. The airline was a public enterprise owned by the entity government and had its hub at the Banja Luka International Airport. The airline launched international services in July 2010 after a cooperation agreement with Adria Airways from Slovenia, selling flights from Banja Luka to Ljubljana. The Republika Srpska government delayed the launch of the airline several times, but ultimately decided to end its support in 2012 due to the airlines lack of funds to lease a proper aircraft.
