= ETF Airways =

Croatian airline

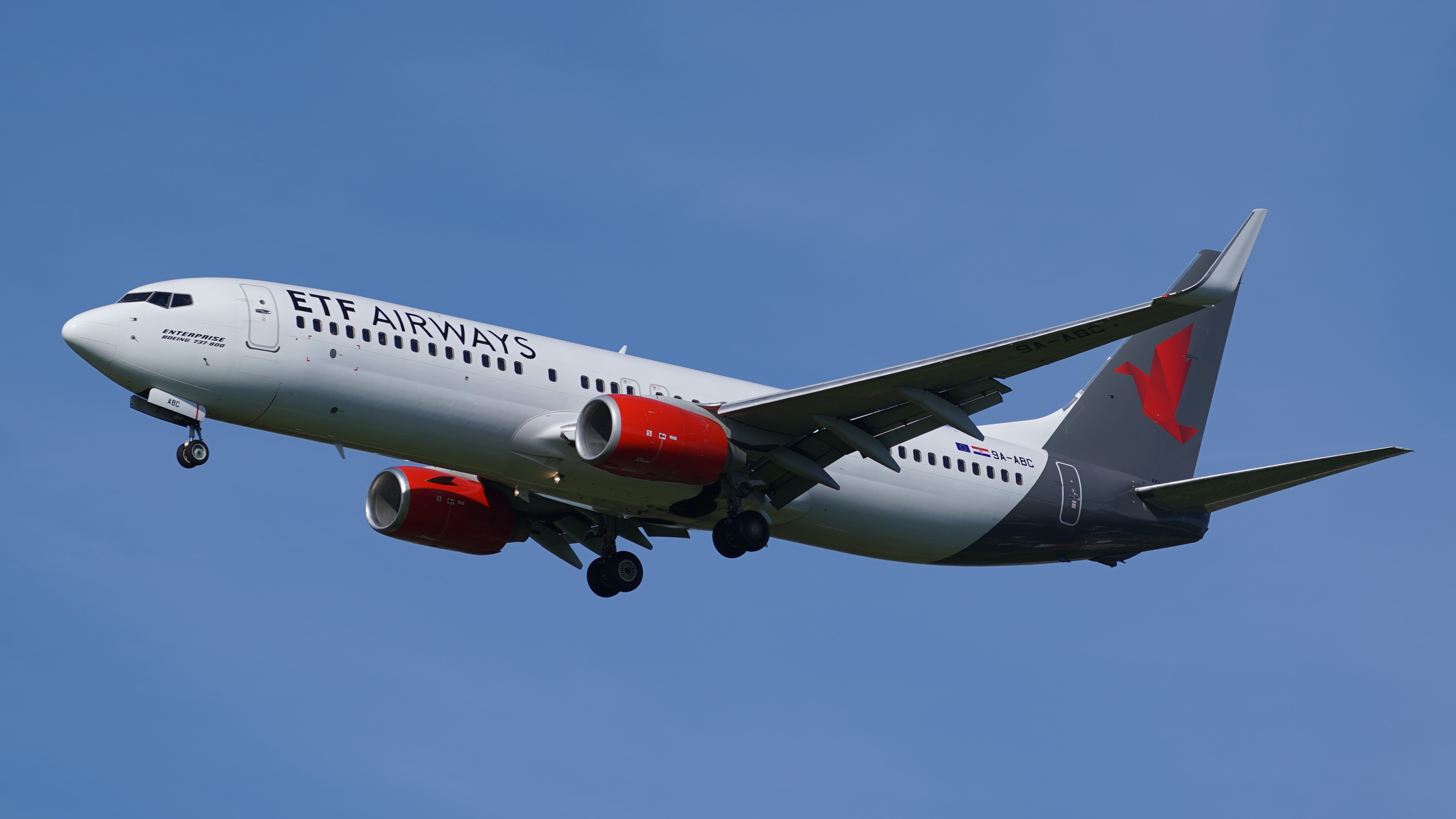
- Boeing 737-800 (9A-ABC) in ETF Airways livery
IATA	ICAO	Call sign
2E	EZZ	ENTERPRISE
- Founded: 2020
- Commenced operations: 4 June 2021
- AOC #: HR-105
- Fleet size: 5
- Headquarters: Zagreb, Croatia
- Key people: Stjepan Bedić (Chief Executive Officer); Marko Banković (Board Member); Kristijan Starčević (Board Member)
- Website: www.etfairways.com

ETF Airways is a Croatian charter and ACMI (wet lease) airline headquartered in Zagreb. The company was registered in November 2020 and received its air operator's certificate from the Croatian Civil Aviation Agency on 28 May 2021. The airline operates Boeing 737-800 aircraft for other carriers and tour operators, and added its first ATR 72-600 in March 2026.

== History ==
The airline was officially registered in November 2020, aiming to be operational with a Boeing 737-800 aircraft by summer 2021 on charter flights from several European countries to holiday destinations along the Adriatic coast of Croatia.

Certification was completed on 28 May 2021, when both its air operator's certificate (number HR-105) and operating license (number HR-OL-29) were issued by the Croatian Civil Aviation Agency.

Revenue operations commenced on 4 June 2021 with a flight between Pristina and Helsinki.

At the same time, the young airline secured an operating contract from French airline Corsair for its second Boeing 737. Starting 22 December 2021, it was utilized on daily round-trips between Reunion and Mayotte on behalf of the French carrier.

A third plane arrived in April 2022, registered 9A-KOR and nicknamed "Discovery". Since then, the airline operated for major European operators such as TUI, Transavia, JET2.COM, Neos and many others.

In addition to EASA, the airline holds IOSA, FAA and Transport Canada certificates.

The airline prides itself of refusing "pay to fly" pilot schemes, a high social score and one simulator training session per year more than required by the law.

=== 2026 ===
On 1 January 2026 the 737-800 9A-LAB was damaged by hail at Córdoba, Argentina, and remained grounded a month later.

In March 2026 the airline took delivery of its first ATR 72-600, 9A-ATR (msn 1387), formerly operated by Mandarin Airlines as B-16852. It was ferried from Ho Chi Minh City to Zagreb on 27–29 March. ch-aviation reported that the airline already had an ACMI contract for the aircraft and planned to add a fourth 737-800. In April 2026 the ATR began flying for Croatia Airlines under a wet lease, replacing the airline's retired Dash 8 turboprops; on 16 April it operated a service to Osijek Airport.

== Fleet ==
=== Current fleet ===
As of July 2026, ETF Airways operates the following aircraft:

Aircraft	In service	Orders	Passengers
ATR 72-600	1	—	
Boeing 737-800	4	—	
Total	5	—	

=== Former fleet ===
As of August 2025, ETF Airways operated 2 Boeing 737-800 and 1 ATR 72-600

== Accidents and incidents ==
- During summer high peak, in early August 2021, one of its aircraft (9A-LAB) suffered a left hand engine failure after sucking in a rabbit during landing at Bremen Airport in Germany. As a consequence, the aircraft was out of service for 12 days, reportedly causing one million euros in expenses for repairs and replacement aircraft. The aircraft returned to service with a replacement engine, while the affected one was sent to the shop for repairs. The Croatian airline blamed Bremen Airport authorities for negligence allowing wildlife to enter the active runway, an occurrence that reportedly happened on many occasions.
- On 1st of January 2026 aircraft 9A-LAB which was operating that day Flybondi flight FO5491, was damaged by hail while on the ground on arrival at Córdoba. The aircraft vacated the runway and stopped on the taxiway for about an hour when the hail appeared and then it continued to the apron. The aircraft sustained damage to wings and flaps. The severity of the impact has left the aircraft grounded ever since. The province of Cordoba experienced extreme weather conditions on New Year’s Day, with winds reaching up to seventy kilometres per hour, heavy rainfall and intense hail.
