= OKI Air International =

Privately owned charter airline based in Podgorica, Montenegro

OKI Air Group
- Founded: 1993
- Hubs: Podgorica Airport
- Headquarters: Podgorica, Montenegro
- Key people: Orhan Hodžić
- Website: http://www.oki.me

OKI Air International is an airline based in Podgorica, Montenegro, it was established on 28th of April 1993. It is a privately owned charter airline operating within Montenegro and the surrounding area. Its main base is Podgorica Airport.

== Fleet ==
As of January 2005 the OKI Air International fleet includes:
