= Di Air =

Adriatic Airways
IATA	ICAO	Call sign
-	9AW	Adriatic Airways
- Founded: 1997
- Hubs: Podgorica Airport; Tivat Airport
- Fleet size: 8
- Destinations: Europe
- Headquarters: Podgorica, Montenegro
- Key people: Capt.Dragan Ivančević - Owner
- Website: http://www.adriaticairways.com

Adriatic Airways is an airline based in Podgorica, Montenegro. It operates international charter flights from Podgorica and Tivat to neighbouring countries. Its main base is Podgorica Airport, with a hub at Tivat Airport.

== History ==
The airline was established in 1997 and started operations in 2000. Owner by Dragan Ivančević and has 4 employees (at April 2026).

== Destinations ==
Adriatic Airways operates scheduled flights from these cities/airport:

=== Domestic ===
- Montenegro
  - Podgorica (Podgorica Airport)
  - Tivat (Tivat Airport)

== Fleet ==
The Adriatic Airways fleet includes the following aircraft (at Jan 2026)

- 1 Cessna Citation 551SP YU-BTT
- 1 Cessna Citation 551SP YU-TBB
- 1 BE76 Duchess Z3-DZZ
- 1 Cessna 172M YU-DWW
- 1 Piper 28A YU-CGS
- 1 R22 YU-SCG
- 1 R44 YU-HMM
- 1 R44 SP-SPM
