= Vlaisavljević =

Vlaisavljević is a Serbian surname. Notable people with the surname include:

- Dušan Vlaisavljević (born 1961), Montenegrin football manager and player
- Milan Vlaisavljević (born 1974) Serbian politician
- Saša Vlaisavljević (born 1968), Serbian engineer, business executive, and a politician
