= Radio Jat =

Radio Jat logo

Radio Jat (Serbian Cyrillic: Радио Јат) is a radio station in Serbia and was a subsidiary of national air carrier Jat Airways which operates in the Belgrade metropolitan area. The radio station was sold to the "Happy media company". The station is still a partner of the national carrier and it has been decided for the name to stay the same rather than change it.

== History ==
Radio Jat was established on 1 April 1999 operating on 95.7 MHz in the Belgrade metropolitan area. It is an urban, informative, musical and commercial radio station. It has also since 2005 managed to be broadcast throughout Serbia on 102.7 MHz.

The Radio Head award is given to companies that have contributed to tourism and business has been given to Radio Jat two times in the last year.

According to latest rating results compiled in June 2006, Jat is the 5th most listened to radio station in Belgrade. It takes the 13th position in Belgrade for the most listened radio station by the younger generation (in age group of 16 to 25) and it is the 11th most listened to radio station in Serbia.

In late 2006, the radio station was sold to the “Happy media group”. A new logo and website was introduced as a result.

== 2009 Relaunch ==
On 1 September 2009, Radio Jat got a broadcasting license from the Serbian Republic Broadcasting Agency (RRA). Playlist consists of Serbian pop music and a news update on every hour. The broadcasts can be heard on 90.2 MHz in Belgrade, and over the internet. The new owner is Radio TDI, also from Belgrade.
