= YRG =

YRG is a three-letter abbreviation with multiple meanings, as described below:

- The IATA Code for Rigolet Airport, Canada
- The ICAO Code for Air Yugoslavia, Serbia
- Yoga for Regular Guys (or Gals) - A fitness system created by pro-wrestler Diamond Dallas Page.
