= Žika Petrović =

Serbian engineer and business executive

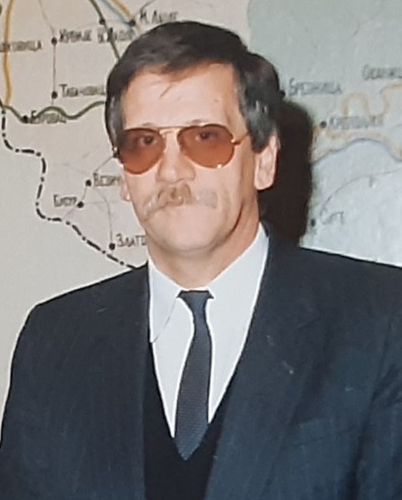
- Born: Živorad Petrović; 1939; Požarevac, Kingdom of Yugoslavia
- Died: 25 April 2000 (aged 60–61); Belgrade, Serbia, FR Yugoslavia
- Education: University of Belgrade
- Occupations: Engineer, business executive
- Employer: Jat Airways (CEO)

Živorad "Žika" Petrović (Serbian Cyrillic: Живорад Жика Петровић; 1939 – 25 April 2000) was a Serbian engineer and business executive. He was assassinated in the spring of 2000. At the time of his death, Petrović was the CEO of Serbian flag carrier Jat Airways. The crime remains unsolved to this day.

Petrović graduated from the University of Belgrade's Faculty of Transport in 1968. He became Jat's CEO in 1992.

He was a member of the Socialist Party of Serbia (SPS), a political party headed at the time by Slobodan Milošević.

== Murder ==
On Tuesday night, 25 April 2000, around 21:30 CET, Petrović was killed by unknown assassin(s) in front of his parents' home at 20 Jaša Prodanović Street in Belgrade. Petrović was reportedly parking his JAT-issued metallic gray Audi in front of the house when two assailants killed him from behind with four bullets to the head and back. A B92 reporter on the scene counted five bullet shells, while Blic reported that more than ten bullets were fired at Petrović. The killers likely used a silencer as nobody in the area reported hearing any gun noise. According to neighbours, the police showed up very quickly after the murder and blocked off the street. Radomir Marković, the head of the State Security Service, came to the crime scene as well.

Western publications speculated about the reasons for Petrović's murder, especially in light of the fact that it came amidst a 2000 crime wave during which many prominent figures in the country were assassinated. These include mobsters Željko "Arkan" Ražnatović (15 January), Radoslav "Bata Trlaja" Trlajić (25 February), Branislav "Dugi" Lainović (20 March), Zoran "Ćanda" Davidović (23 March), and Zoran "Skole" Uskoković (27 April), politicians Pavle Bulatović (7 February 2000) and Ivan Stambolić (25 August 2000), even two unsuccessful attempts on the life of opposition politician Vuk Drašković.

== See also ==
- List of unsolved murders (2000–present)
