= Saša Vlaisavljević =

Serbian engineer, executive, politician (born 1968)

- Саша Влаисављевић
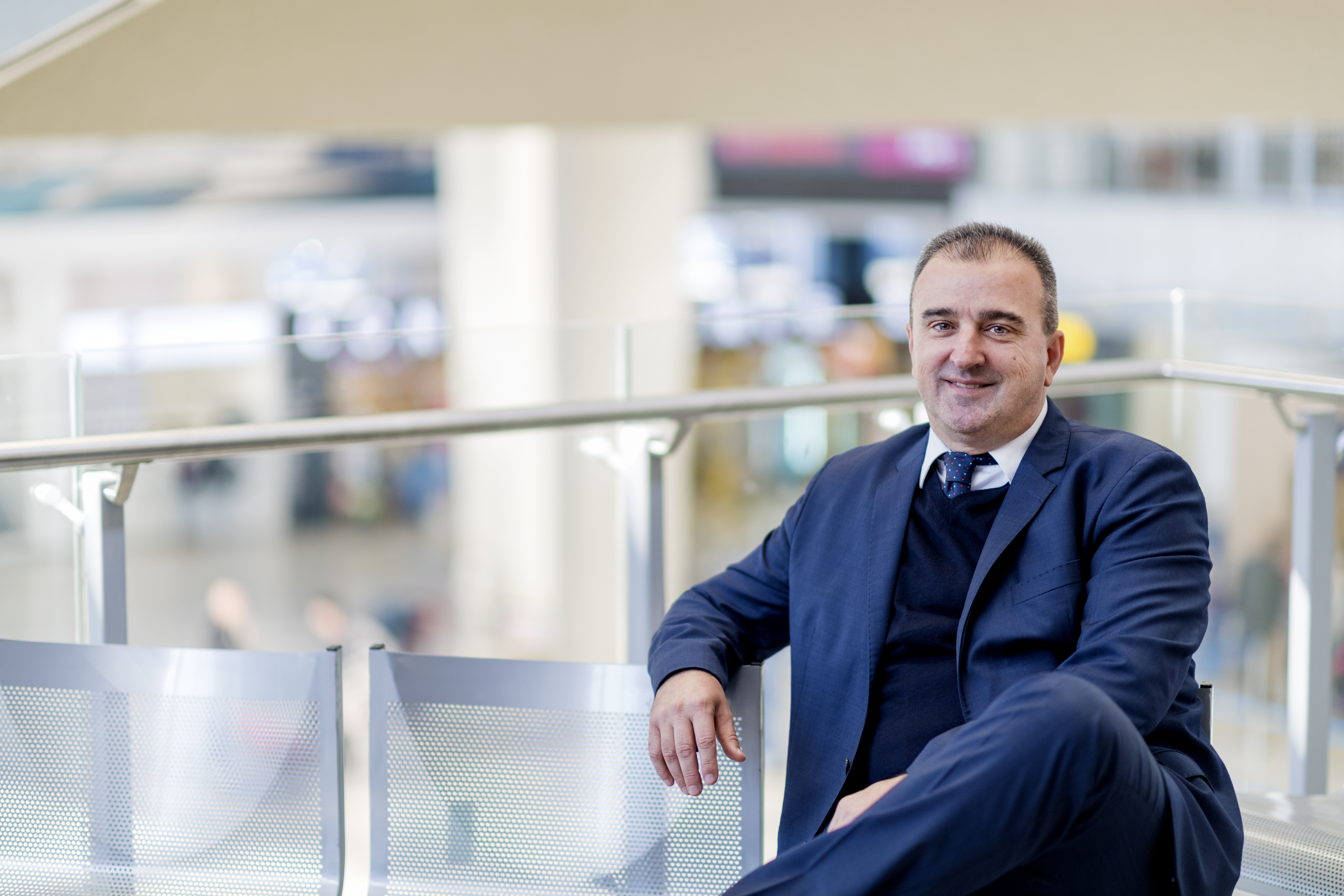

Personal details
- Born: 27 April 1968 (age 58) Bihać, SR Bosnia and Herzegovina, SFR Yugoslavia
- Children: 2
- Education: University of Belgrade; University of Zagreb
- Website: www.antb.rs

Saša Vlaisavljević (born April 27, 1968, in Bihać, SR Bosnia-Herzegovina, SFR Yugoslavia) is a CEO and the President of Executive Board of Belgrade Nikola Tesla Airport He is a Serbian engineer, business executive, and a politician.

Vlaisavljević obtained his transport engineering degree from the University of Belgrade's Faculty of Transport, at the Air Traffic department. Also he is holding a degree of the Faculty of Traffic Sciences of University in Zagreb.

== Career ==
=== Jat Airways ===
He started working at Jat Airways, Serbian flag carrier, in 1995. He soon rose to the position of sector chief and later ground control director. On October 31, 2007, Serbian government named him to the post of Jat Airways CEO (generalni direktor). Early on in his leadership of the airline, Vlaisavljević benefited from the positive business outcomes he inherited in terms of passenger growth, allowing Jat to end the year 2007 with a profit and 1.3 million passengers transported, its best results since the year 1990. He also presided over three new destination additions: Oslo, as well as Pula and Thessaloniki during 2008 summer season.

However, the privatization efforts were ultimately unsuccessful despite some public interest from Aeroflot and Air India. The privatization tender was opened on July 31, 2008, by the Serbian Government's Privatization Agency with a starting price for 51% stake set at US$51 million. Prospective buyers could buy from 51% up to 70% stake in the company. But, until the tender's closing date on September 26, 2008, no one submitted an offer. As a result, Serbian Government decided to restructure the company, rather than calling another tender with a lower starting price.

Earlier, in March 2008, Vlaisavljević estimated Jat's fleet to be worth around US$100–120 million. He also mentioned on the same occasion that the amount owed to Jat by other parties (MAT Macedonian Airlines, Nigerian Sosoliso Airlines, unused advance paid to Airbus, General Sales Agent for Middle Eastern destinations, etc.) adds up to a combined US$50 million. Among the additional assets in company's ownership, he listed 14 slots at London's Heathrow Airport as well as slots at other European airports. On the other hand, he confirmed Jat's debt to be around US$209 million.

Overall, calendar year 2008 was very bad for Jat with an annual posted loss of US$80 million, mostly because of high fuel prices and decreased passenger loads during the 2008 financial crisis.

=== City of Belgrade ===
In early July 2009, Vlaisavljević started working for the City of Belgrade administration as their city manager, answering directly to mayor Dragan Đilas. Đilas actually hired him in late 2008, but Vlaisavljević remained at Jat for another 6 months due to the company's ongoing restructuring effort at the time following its failed privatization attempt during the 2008 financial crisis. He resigned after only after three weeks in office due to personal dispute with mayor Dragan Đilas.

=== Serbian Chamber of commerce ===
In December 2009, he was appointed a Vice President of Serbian Chamber of Commerce' and Industry of Serbia (abbr. CCIS or PKS). He remained in the position of Vice president until 2013, when he became its director. During his work in Serbian Chamber of Commerce, he gained experience that gives a completely new dimension to the development path of each manager. That experience enabled him, after returning to the domain of responsibility for one system, to start looking at it far more broadly.

=== Belgrade Nikola Tesla Airport ===
After the successful work in Serbian Chamber of Commerce, in 2014 he took over Belgrade Nikola Tesla Airport (Serbian: Аеродром Никола Тесла Београд, romanized: Aerodrom Nikola Tesla Beograd) or Belgrade Airport (Serbian: Аеродром Београд, romanized: Aerodrom Beograd) (IATA: BEG, ICAO: LYBE). Under his leadership, the airport records the best years of business development (2014-2018). The value of the airport has increased from € 200m to € 1.5 billion, while the number of passengers has increased by more than a million passengers. More than 10 new airlines have started flights from Belgrade. The net profit of airport every year, starting from 2014 and ending in 2018, was over € 25 million. The increase in net profit was about 200 times higher compared to the one in 2013.

The period from 2013 is considered the most successful business period since the establishment of Nikola Tesla Belgrade Airport. Prior to 2012, the capacity of Nikola Tesla Belgrade Airport was not sufficient to serve the 5.3 million passengers recorded in 2017. Infrastructure investments have increased the capacity to receive and dispatch passengers from 5 to 7.5 million passengers annually. Due to a profit of more than 120 million euros in the last 4.5 years, since 2014, more than €85 million have been invested in the development of infrastructure, technology and capacity from its own funds, without credit borrowing and interference on regular air traffic operation. The value of the airport's share has increased by 5 times since 2013, while the value of ANT has increased by several hundred million euros.

During the 2018 summer season, passengers were offered regular and charter flights by 39 airlines operating from Belgrade to 96 destinations in 37 countries in Europe, the United States, the Middle and Far East and North Africa. Belgrade Airport is the first airport in the region to re-establish regular intercontinental flights, and the only one in the region to have long-haul traffic to both America and China, as a result of China's strong economic ties with Serbia.

=== Nikola Tesla Airport ===
The Republic of Serbia, represented by the Government of the Republic of Serbia and Nikola Tesla Airport Belgrade, during 2017, conducted a procedure aimed at granting concessions for financing, development through construction and reconstruction, maintenance and management of the infrastructure of the airport and performing the activities of the airport operator (hereinafter referred to as "Concession").

On March 22, 2018, the Concession Agreement on Financing, Development through Construction and Reconstruction, Maintenance and Management of the Infrastructure of AD Nikola Tesla Airport Belgrade was concluded and the activities of the Airport Operator at the Nikola Tesla Airport in Belgrade, between the Republic of Serbia, represented by the Government of the Republic of Serbia and AD Nikola Tesla Airport Belgrade, on the one hand, as Concession Provider and VINCI Airports Serbia doo Belgrade, a legal entity established in accordance with the laws of the Republic of Serbia.

Bearing in mind that the contracting parties fulfilled all the requirements during the transitional period, the certificate of the airport was transferred from Nikola Tesla Airport Belgrade to Vinci Airports Serbia Ltd. Belgrade and the concession started on December 22, 2018. This led to a change in the predominant activity and composition of the managing bodies of airport.

== Other business activities ==
- From 2019 - A member of a Council of Faculty of Transport and Traffic Engineering
- From 2018 - A member of the presidency of Serbian Association of Employers
- From 2018 - Vice President of Basketball club Crvena Zvezda
- From 2018 - President of the Assembly of the Water polo Association of Serbia
- From 2016 - A member of Association of Corporate Directors of Serbia
- From 2014 - A president of Financial Commission of Chamber of Commerce and Industry of Serbia

== Award and recognition ==
=== Personal awards ===
| Award or recognition | Awarded by | Year |
|---|---|---|
| Serbia - Inspirational Leader of the Year | ACQ5 Global Awards | 2018 |
| Business Leader of the Year | Chamber of Commerce and Industry of Serbia | 2018 |
| The best European Manager BiH | European Association of Managers in BiH | 2018 |
| Most Influential CEO of the Year 2018 | Corporate Excellence Award | 2018 |
| Serbia - Inspirational Leader of the Year | ACQ5 Global Awards | 2017 |
| Best European Manager and Best Company | European Association of Managers | 2017 |
| Award for the achieved results in the development and improvement of the economy | Chamber of Commerce and Industry of Serbia | 2015 |
| plaque Najevropljanin Srbije 2014 | European Movement Serbia | 2014 |

=== Airport awards ===
Under the leadership of Saša Vlaisavljević, AD Belgrade Nikola Tesla Airport has won numerous international, regional and domestic awards for business success:

| Award or recognition | Awarded by | Year |
|---|---|---|
| 100 Najvećih, Aerodrom Nikola Tesla Beograd | Poslovne novine | 2019 |
| Rising star Airport 2018 - South Eastern Europe | Air Transport Awards Best International Airport 2018 | 2018 |
| Best International Airport | Balkan Enterprise Awards 2018 | 2018 |
| Leaders in Passenger Air Transport | Global Excellence Award | 2018 |
| Best International Airport | Air Transport Awards | 2017 |
| Airport of the Year - Serbia | Eastern European Business Elite Awards | 2016 |
| Eastern and Central Europe - Company of the Year | ACQ5 Global Awards | 2017 |
| Award for regional excellence in innovation | LeFonti Awards | 2017 |
| Award Најбоље из Србије 2016 - The best of Serbia | Chamber of Commerce and Industry of Serbia | 2016 |
| Superbrandsaward in the category of transport | Superbrands | 2016 |
| Award for its contribution to improving competitiveness in the field of transport and logistics | Brand Leader Award | 2016, 2015 |
| 5th place among the best airports in Eastern Europe | Skytrax | 2016, 2015 |
| for the largest increase in passenger numbers | Euro Annie | 2014 |
| Award Београдски победник | Chamber of Commerce and Industry of Serbia | 2014 |
| Најбоље из Србије 2014 - The best of Serbia | Chamber of Commerce and Industry of Serbia | 2014 |
| Award Капетан Миша Анастасијевић for the best company 2014 | agency Media Invent in collaboration with the University of Novi Sad | 2014 |
| Plaque for the results achieved in the development and improvement of the economy | Chamber of Commerce and Industry of Serbia | 2014 |
| Air Force and Air Defense Plaque for many years of successful cooperation | Air Force and Air Defense | 2014 |
