= Srđan Radovanović =

Serbian lawyer and business executive

Srđan Radovanović (born 1959 in Belgrade) is a Serbian lawyer and business executive. He was employed at the Secretariat for Internal Affairs in Belgrade and he also worked as an attorney. He was part of the management teams at "Grand kafa" and "Droga Kolinska", a member of the board of directors of "Soko Štark" and the board president of "Palanački kiseljak".

On July 2, 2009, he became the chief executive officer (generalni direktor) of Jat Airways, the Serbian state-owned flag carrier. He had been appointed to the post by the Democratic Party (DS). This appointment marked a break with the unwritten tradition that Jat CEOs should come from within the company and should have transport engineering backgrounds.

In his first press interview after his appointment, Radovanović stated that Jat's loss during the calendar year 2008 was €80 million.

During a brief interview in September 2009, Radovanović said that in 2010, Jat Airways was expected to increase revenues to 150 million euros, and that there would be a further reduction in the company's losses. It was necessary to make large savings and this would be done by reducing the number of employees and introducing financial discipline in the company. Radovanovic also announced the renewal of a contract with the European aircraft manufacturer Airbus to renew the fleet and the acquisition of new aircraft.

== Controversy ==
Barely weeks into the job at Jat, Radovanović got embroiled in controversy when Serbian print media claimed that he had enabled his brother Radovan Radovanović, news editor of 24 sata newspaper, to travel on a special flight from Hurghada to Luxor in Egypt. The flight was carrying the grieving family members of Serbian tourists who had been killed in a bus accident on July 16, 2009, and was sponsored by the government. The flight took off from Belgrade to Hurghada on July 20, 2009, so that the families could claim the bodies of their loved ones who had been involved in the accident. Radovan Radovanović had been sent by his newspaper to report from the accident site. The media claimed that, despite explicit orders from the Serbian Government that no one except family members should be on the flight, Radovanović had obtained a free ticket for his brother, thereby bypassing the added security.
