= Air Yugoslavia =

Yugoslavian airline (1969–2005)

IATA	ICAO	Call sign
—	YRG	Yugair
- Founded: 1969; 57 years ago
- Ceased operations: 2005; 21 years ago
- Hubs: Belgrade Airport
- Parent company: JAT Yugoslav Airlines
- Headquarters: Belgrade, Yugoslavia

Air Yugoslavia (Serbian: Ер Југославија / Er Jugoslavija) was an airline based in Belgrade, Yugoslavia (now Serbia). It was established in 1969 and operated numerous international charter passenger services, using aircraft from parent airline JAT Yugoslav Airlines. Its main base was Belgrade Nikola Tesla Airport.

Air Yugoslavia officially existed as a subsidiary of JAT. The division called "Air Yugoslavia" has been replaced with the Charter and Tourism Department within Jat Airways in 2005.

In 1973, it operated four Boeing 707 and three Sud Aviation Caravelle. In 1975, the company operated two Boeing 707-320C and three Sud Aviation Caravelle.

In summer 1989, Air Yugoslavia operated flights from Belgrade to Niš, Priština, Skopje, Ohrid, Titograd, Tivat, Dubrovnik, Sarajevo, Split, Zadar, Pula, Rijeka, Zagreb and Maribor, and from Zagreb to Belgrade, Tivat, Dubrovnik, Split, Zadar, Pula, Ljubljana, Düsseldorf, Stuttgart and Hamburg.

== Code data ==
- ICAO Code: YRG
- Callsign: Yugair

== See also ==
- Jat Airways
