= Serbian Chamber of Commerce =

- Привредна Комора Србије
- Official logo
- Formation: 1857; 169 years ago
- Type: Advocacy group
- Headquarters: Belgrade, Serbia
- Region served: Serbia
- Methods: Media attention Direct-appeal campaigns Political lobbying
- President: Marko Čadež
- Website: www.pks.rs

The Chamber of Commerce and Industry of Serbia (abbr. CCIS or PKS) is an independent, and non-budget institution. Its stated objectives are to support the national association of all Serbian businesses; to establish Serbia as a country with great investment potential, free market economy, and open borders; and prepare Serbia to be competitively integrated into the European mainstream. The CCIS operates a widely spread chamber network encompassing sixteen Regional Chamber of Commerce, two Provincial Chambers, the Belgrade Chamber of Commerce, and Industry, and nine representative offices abroad.

== History ==
Serbian Chamber of Commerce was founded in 1857. It was the first commercial association called " Trade Board ". In 1870 the trade committees were formed in Šabac, Smederevo, Valjevo. Later, in 1910 they founded the Industrial, Commercial and Workers Association. In 1931 the chambers were recognized as public law organizations and advisory bodies of the state administration. After the Second World War in 1945 begins with the establishment of branch chambers. In 1962 the reversed branch of commerce were established and uniform Chamber of Commerce also. In 2001 the effective Reform Act chambers happened. The changes were made to the Law on Chambers of Commerce in 2009. In 2013 came into force the new Law on Chambers of Commerce.

== Main activities ==
Main activities of Serbian Chamber of Commerce are representing the interests of members in front of the state authorities and institutions, carrying out the public powers by the issuance of various documents, improvement of the international economic relations and promotion of the economy both in the country and abroad. Another also important activities are in providing business information and consulting services. Business training is included in activities that Serbian Chamber of Commerce is providing, fostering good business practices and business ethics. Courts and Court of Arbitration at the CCIS also.

=== Assembly ===
The Assembly is the supreme body of the Chamber of Commerce and Industry of Serbia counting 144 members who are being elected in accordance with four criteria: region, territory, branch and section. The CCIS Assembly adopts the Statute of the Chamber of Commerce and Industry of Serbia, the Chamber Work Program, the Financial program, the Annual financial report of the Chamber, the Decision on the amount of membership dues and payment deadlines, the Codex and other codes of conducting. The Chamber defines its opinion and gives further directions of functioning to the authorities and bodies of the Chamber in the field of economic development, the economic system and macroeconomic policy and improvement of the international economic relations, etc.

=== Managing Board ===
The Regulatory Board of the Chamber is a regulatory body of the Chamber that controls the legislation of the Chamber work, the implementation of the Statute and other acts of the Chamber. It controls the Budget of the Chamber and its Professional departments. It counts seven members. They are elected from the list of the members of the Chamber and recognized by the Managing Board. The term of the office of the members of Regulatory Board is up to four years and it may be renewable just once.

=== Regulatory Board ===
The Regulatory Board of the Chamber controls the legislation of the Chamber work, the implementation of the Statute and other general acts of the Chamber. It controls the Budget of the Chamber and all Professional Departments. It counts seven members who are elected from the list of the members of the Chamber and on suggestion of the Managing Board. The term of the office of the members of Regulatory Board is up to four years and it may be renewable just once.

=== President ===
The President of the Chamber of Commerce and Industry of Serbia is nominated by the Chamber Assembly from the list of successful businessmen and at the proposal of the Managing Board. The term of the office of the President is up to four years. It may be prolonged just once for another period of up to four years. The President is in charge of his activities to the Chamber Assembly. The President represents the Chamber and is responsible for the legislation of its work, organizes and coordinates the cooperation with the National Assembly and the Government of the Republic of Serbia and other authorities and organizations, cooperates with chambers of commerce in Serbia and abroad and with other international and national economic organizations and associations. The President of the Chamber of Commerce and Industry of Serbia is Željko Sertić .

== Association ==
- Association of Energy and Energy Mining
- Association of Construction, Building Material Industry and Housing
- Association of Chemical and Pharmaceutical Industry, Rubber and Non-Metal Industry
- Association of Textile, Garments, Leather and Footwear Industry
- Association of IT Industry
- Association of Communal Activity
- Association of Metal Mines, Ferrous and Non-Ferous Metallurgy
- Association of Creative Industry
- Association of Metal and Electro Industry
- Association of Agriculture, food Industry, Tobacco Industry and Water Management
- Association of Forestry and Wood Processing Industry, Cellulose and Paper
- Association of Trade
- Association of Tourism and Hospitality Business
- Association of Transport and Telecommunications
- Association of Private Security

=== International Chamber Associations ===
Serbia, road commerce between east and west.

- ICC
- Eurochambres
- ABC

== Regional cooperation ==
- CEFTA
- BSEC

== See also ==
- Serbia Investment and Export Promotion Agency
