= Milan Vlaisavljević =

Serbian politician

Milan Vlaisavljević (Serbian Cyrillic: Милан Влаисављевић; born 1974) is a politician in Serbia. He has served in the Assembly of Vojvodina since 2012 as a member of the Serbian Progressive Party.

== Private career ==
Vlaisavljević holds a Bachelor of Science degree in Psychology. He is the director of the Vita addictions centre in Novi Sad and often speaks about addiction issues in the Serbian media.

In late 2019, N1 reported that Vlaisavljević was the owner of the Fontana hotel in Vrnjacka Banja, which received significant funding from the Serbian ministry of economy for renovations.

== Politician ==
Vlaisavljević received the second position on the Progressive Party's electoral list in the 2012 Vojvodina provincial election and was elected when the list won fourteen mandates. The election was won by the Democratic Party and its allies, and Vlaisavljević served in opposition for the next four years.

Vojvodina adopted a system of full proportional representation for the 2016 provincial election. Vlaisavljević this time received the twentieth position on the Progressive list and was re-elected when the list won a majority victory with sixty-three out of 120 mandates. He won a third term in the 2020 provincial election, in which the Progressives and their allies won an increased majority.

He is now the president of the assembly committee on administrative and mandatory issues and a member of the committee on security.
