= JAT (airline) =

Airline of Yugoslavia and Serbia (1947–2013)

Jat Airways

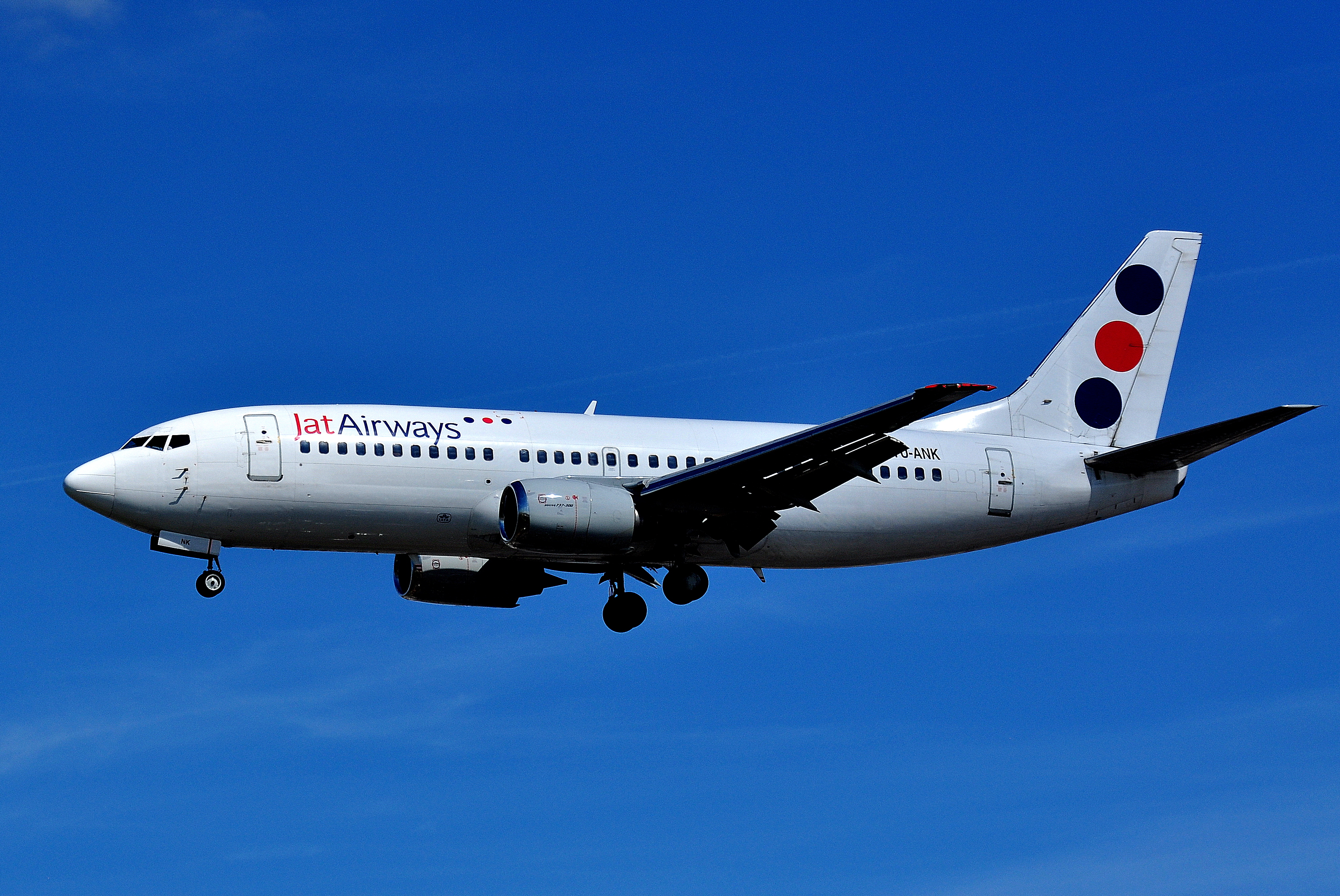
- A Jat Airways Boeing 737-300
IATA	ICAO	Call sign
JU	JAT	JAT
- Founded: 17 June 1927; 99 years ago (as Aeroput) (Note: The company that is today known as Jat Airways was founded as JAT Yugoslav Airlines in January 1947. It sees itself in the tradition of Aeroput, the Yugoslav national airline founded in 1927, which suspended all services at the start of World War II in Yugoslavia in April 1941. After the war, Aeroput renewed work on 2 July 1945, when the general meeting of shareholders elected the first post-war management of the company. The meeting was attended by delegates of the new government of Democratic Federal Yugoslavia (DFY) including its head of state Ivan Ribar, who was a pre-war shareholder and board member. The work permit was a farce, since the Communist government adopted a decree prohibiting private joint-stock companies. On 24 December 1948 the Aeroput was liquidated and all of its property, pilots and mechanics where transferred to the new airline. As such, Jat Airways considered Aeroput as its historical predecessor and thus often cited "1927" as its foundation date.)
- Commenced operations: 1 April 1947; 79 years ago (as JAT Yugoslav Airlines)
- Ceased operations: 26 October 2013; 12 years ago (became Air Serbia)
- Hubs: Belgrade Nikola Tesla Airport
- Frequent-flyer program: Extra Flight Club
- Fleet size: 17
- Destinations: 35
- Parent company: Jat Airways shareholding (owned by Government of Serbia)
- Headquarters: Belgrade, Serbia
- Key people: Dane Kondić (last CEO)
- Revenue: ▲€135.30 million (2013)
- Net income: ▼ -€69.30 million (2013)
- Total assets: ▲€304.97 million (2013)
- Total equity: €0 (2013)
- Employees: 1,527 (2013)

Jat Airways (stylized as JatAirways; Serbo-Croatian: Jat ervejz / Јат ервејз) was the national flag carrier and largest airline of Yugoslavia and later Serbia and Montenegro and finally Serbia. Founded in 1927 as Aeroput, the airline ceased operations during World War II. After resuming flights in 1947, the airline was renamed Jugoslovenski Aerotransport (abbreviated JAT, pronounced [jât]; "Yugoslav Air Transport") on 1 April 1947. The airline was renamed again on 8 August 2003. Jat Airways and their predecessors were one of the oldest airlines still in operation. Flight operations were based at Belgrade Nikola Tesla Airport, and the airline operated scheduled services to 72 international destinations, outside the areas formerly part of Yugoslavia, as well as charters and wet leases. Jat Airways was owned by the government of Serbia and had 1,250 employees.

On 1 August 2013, the Government of Serbia and Etihad Airways entered into an agreement that reorganized the operations of Jat Airways, and renamed it Air Serbia after the transitional period ended. Certain assets, such as the ATR 72 aircraft, would be transitioned to Air Serbia, while other assets (such as the 737-300s) would remain in JAT Airways branding until retired. The change marked the end of 66 years of the JAT brand.

== History ==
=== Aeroput ===
Six Aeroput Potez 29/2 biplanes at the old Belgrade–Dojno Polje airport, 1929

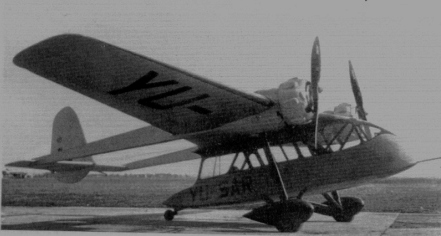
Aeroput MMS-3 made in Aeroput workshops in Zemun, 1935

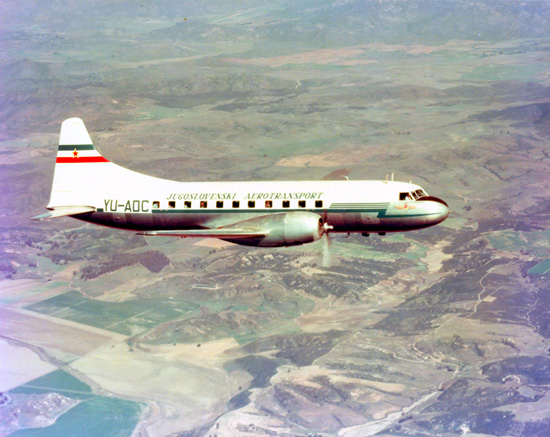
JAT Convair CV-340

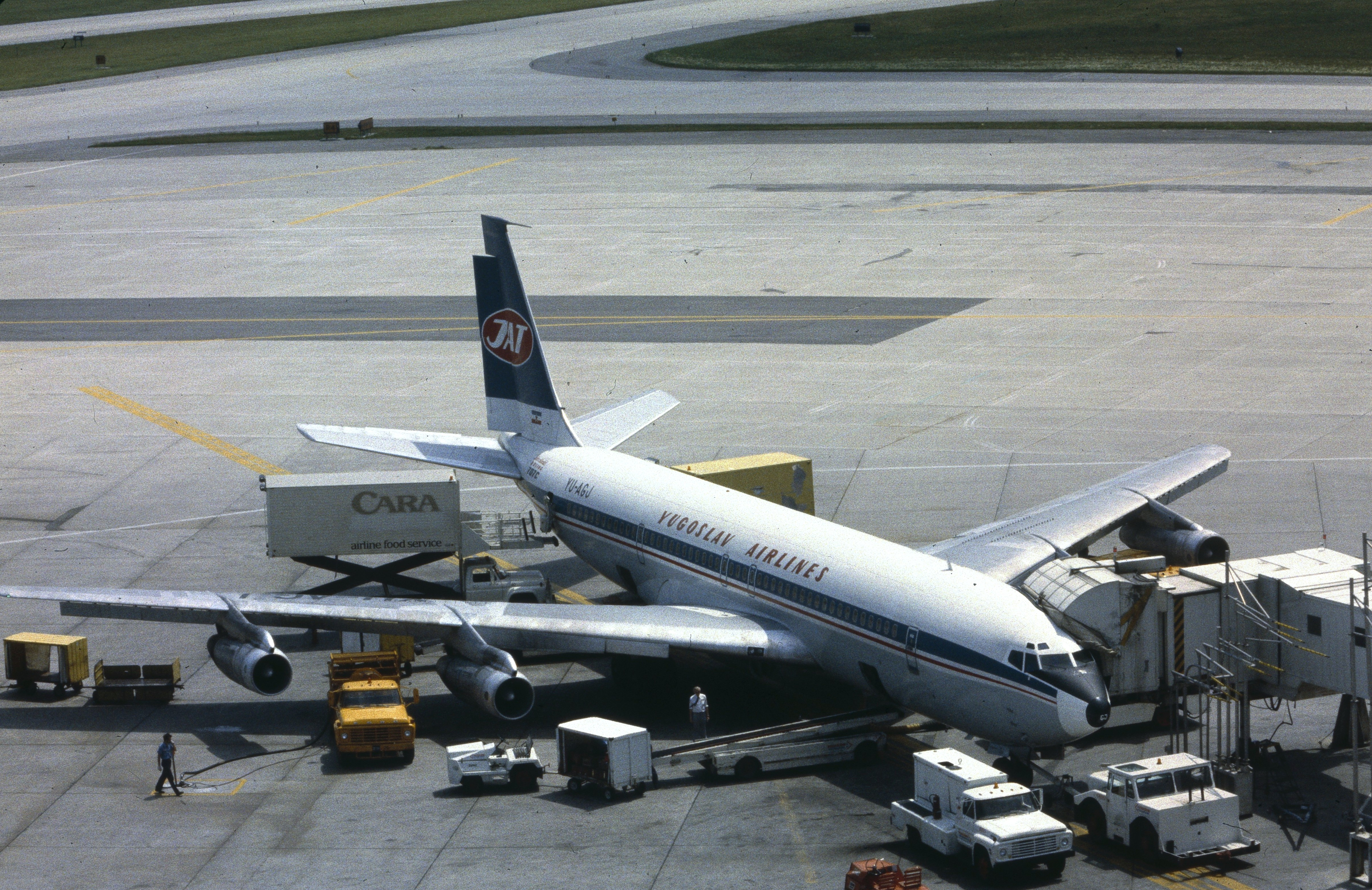
JAT Boeing 707 at Toronto Airport in 1984

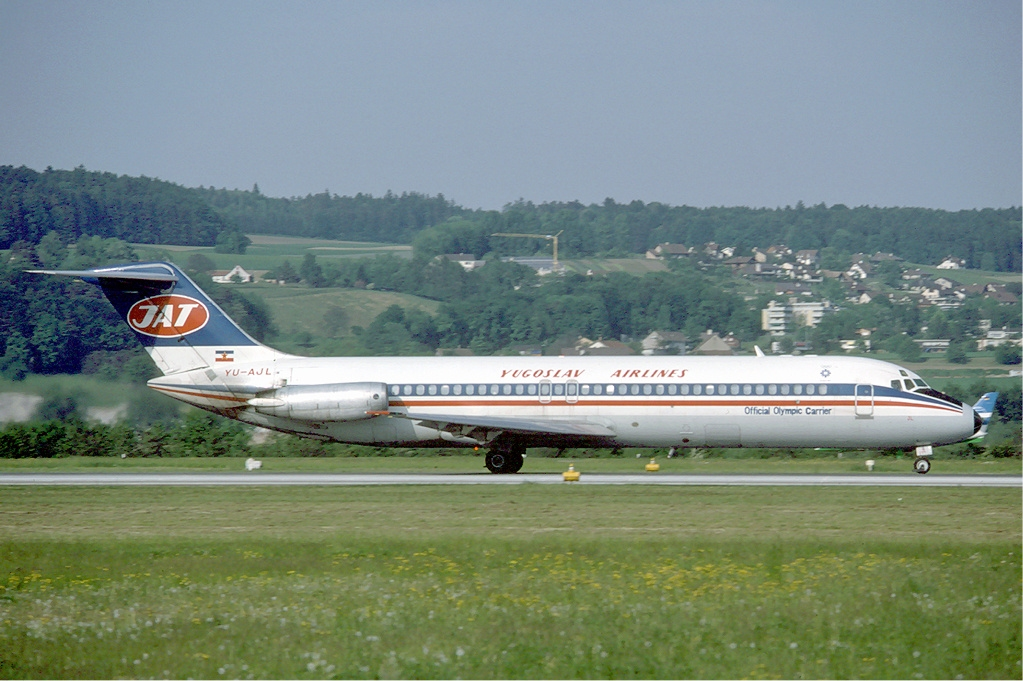
JAT McDonnell Douglas DC-9-32 at Zurich Airport in May 1985

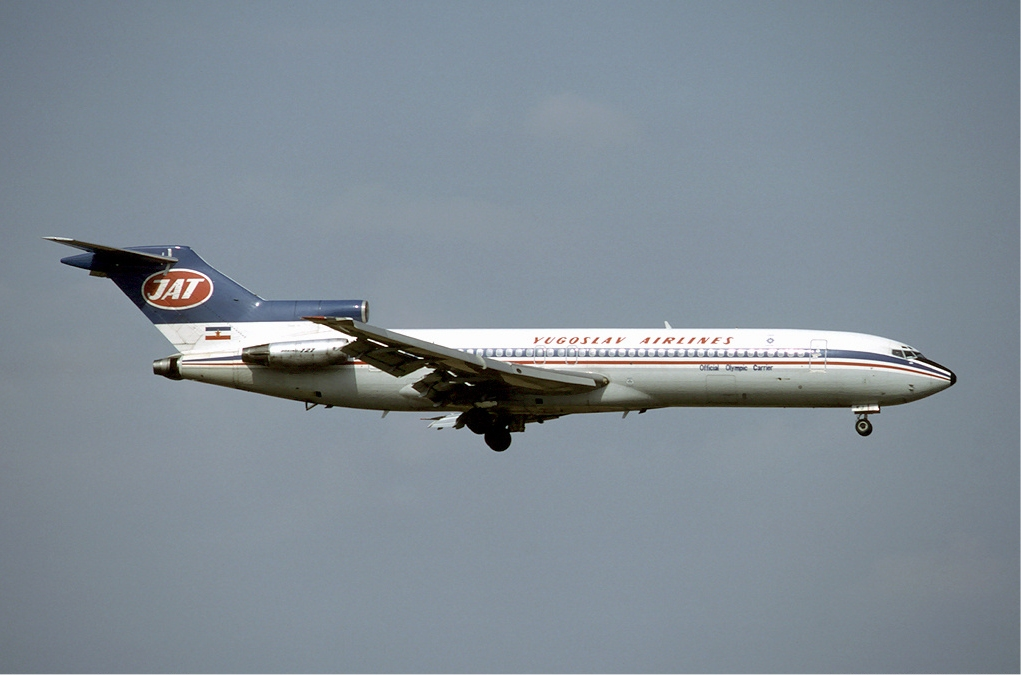
JAT Boeing 727-200 at Zurich Airport in May 1985

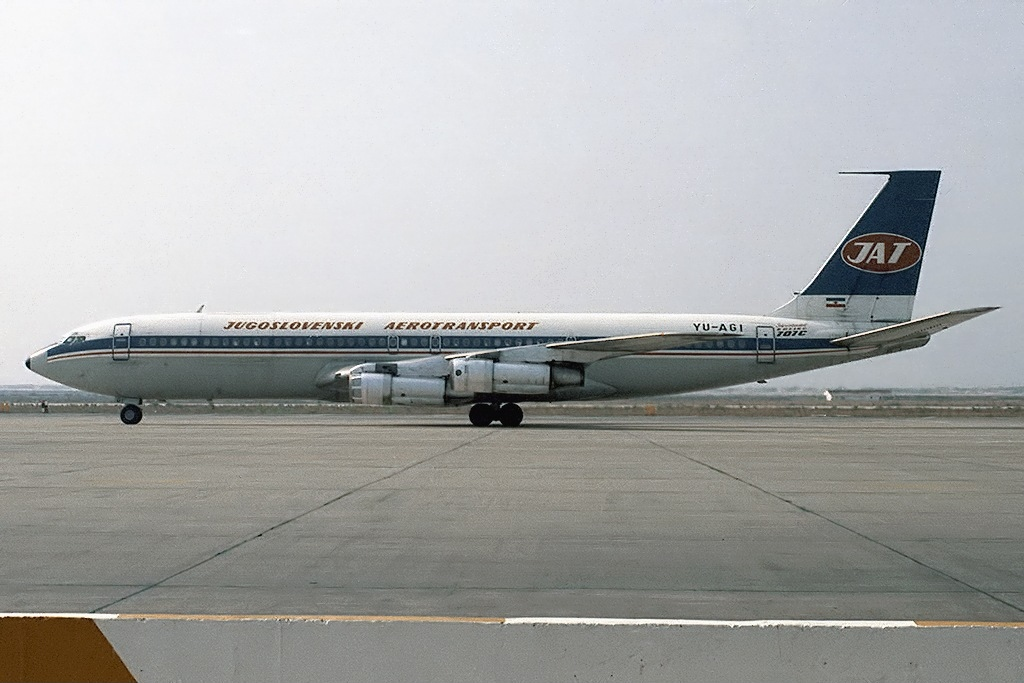
JAT Boeing 707 at Faro Airport in November 1985

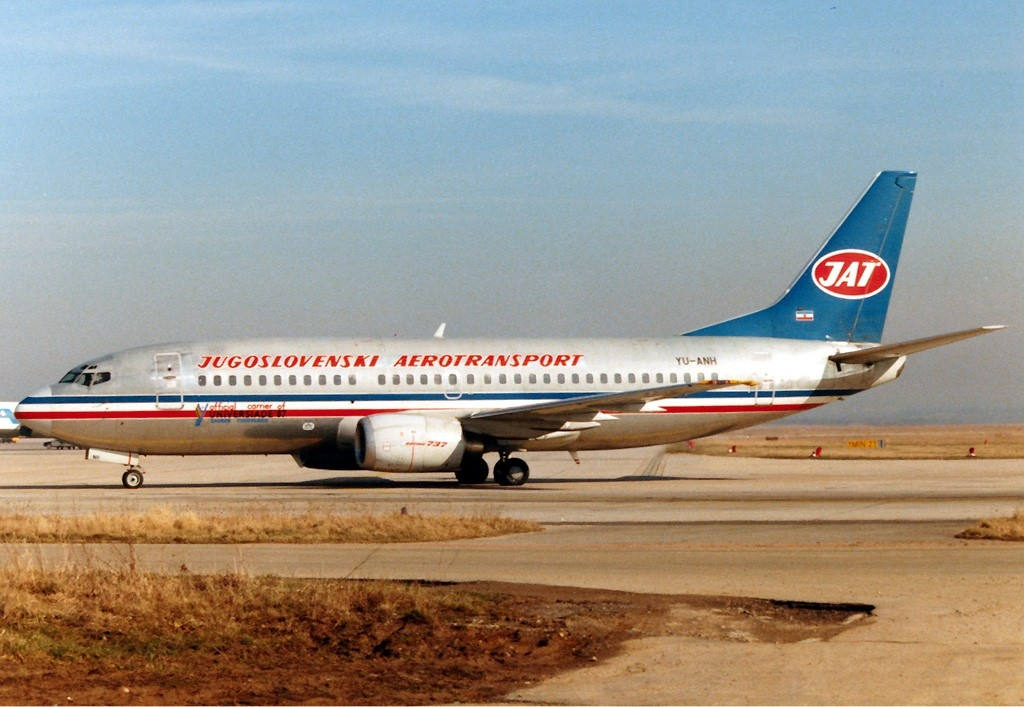
JAT Boeing 737-300 at Stuttgart Airport, 1988

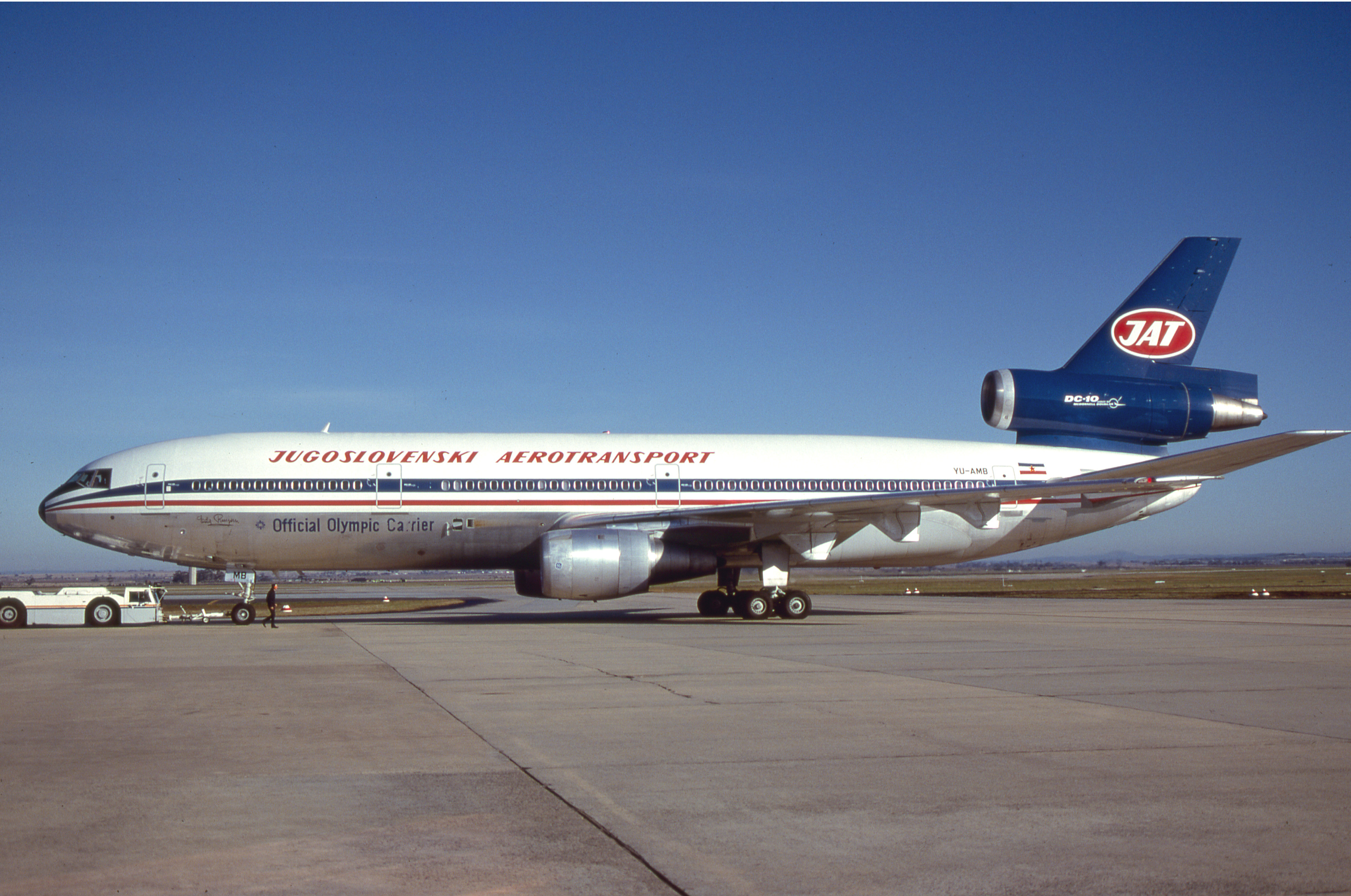
JAT McDonnell Douglas DC-10-30 at Sydney Airport, 1985, with a classic livery

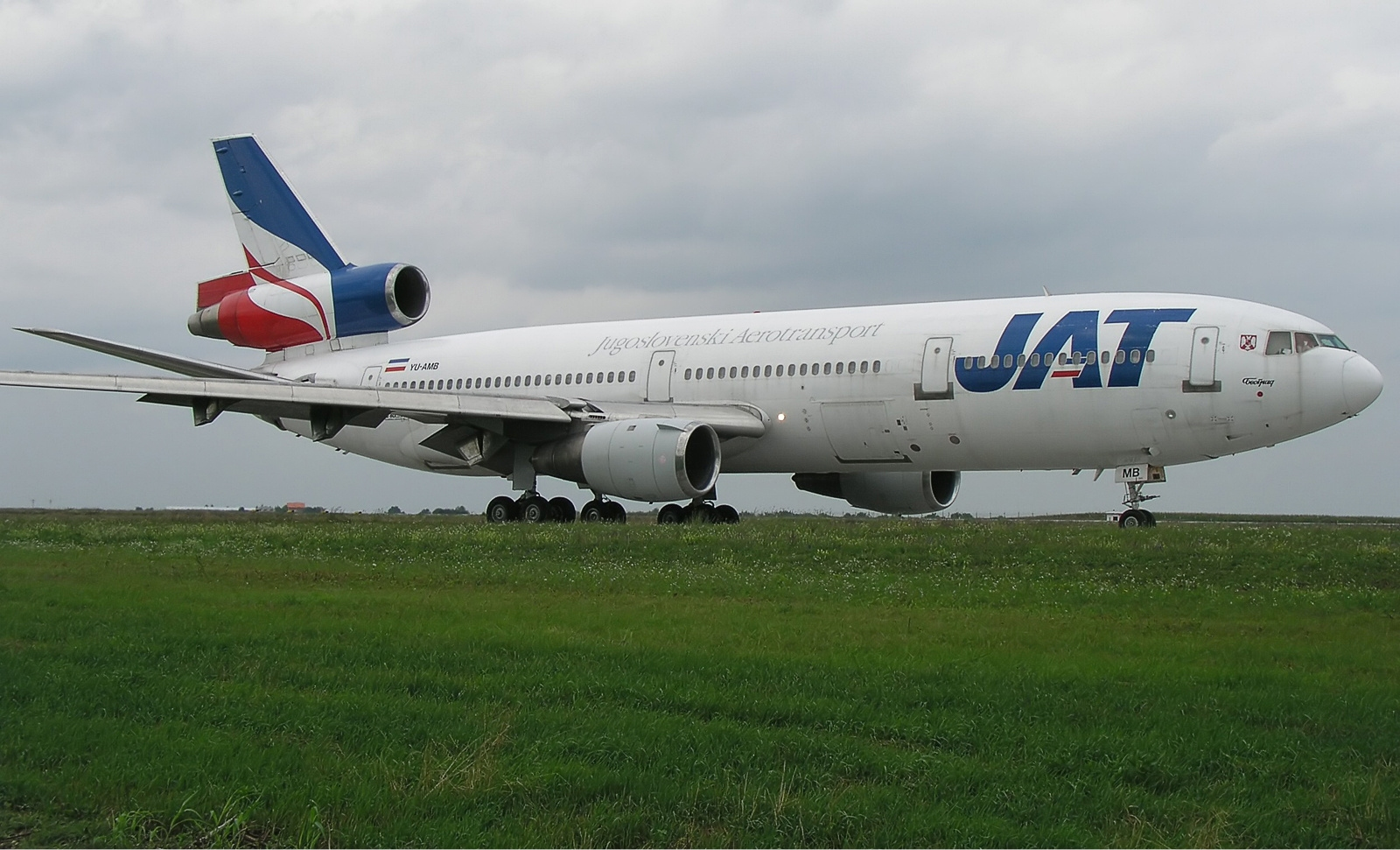
JAT Yugoslav Airlines McDonnell Douglas DC-10-30 at Belgrade Nikola Tesla Airport, 2003

JAT traces its heritage back to 1927 when Aeroput, the first civil airline in Yugoslavia was founded. Their first international flight was in 1929 between Belgrade and Graz. In 1937, the expansion of international routes and an increase in passenger numbers enabled Aeroput to acquire the Lockheed Model 10 Electra. Aeroput continued to operate until the start of World War II. JAT Yugoslav Airlines was launched on 1 April 1947 and replaced Aeroput in 1948. the name was changed to Jugoslovenski Aerotransport (abbreviated JAT; "Yugoslavian Air Transport"), then to JAT Yugoslav Airlines and finally to Jat Airways on 8 August 2003.

=== JAT – Yugoslav Airlines ===
In 1946, it was apparent that the Yugoslav Air Force could not be involved in the nation's post-war build-up of civil aviation. Consequently, preparations were made for the formation of an air transport company. Three Douglas C-47 Skytrain and three Junkers Ju 52 were converted to carry passengers. The airline was officially renamed Jugoslovenski Aerotransport (JAT) on 1 April 1947.

In 1949, Yugoslavia was faced with a dire international position: isolated both by the West and the East. This caused further rationing of fuel, difficulties in procuring spare parts, and the cancellation of all flights to Eastern European destinations. JAT was forced to survive on six domestic lines. When Yugoslavia turned to the West, an agreement was made with Swissair to open the Belgrade-Zürich route, which was inaugurated on 24 August 1949. Company stagnation marked operations in 1949 because the traffic volume was well below fleet potentials and transport needs in the country. However, 1954 was in many ways a turning point. Convair CV-340 and Convair CV-440 Metropolitan aircraft were purchased for short-haul and medium-haul routes, after which the Douglas DC-3 was used only on domestic routes. Multiple international and domestic routes were opened soon after. In 1957, six Ilyushin Il-14M aircraft were purchased. JAT purchased several Douglas DC-6Bs for long-haul routes in 1959.

=== Jet age ===
In 1963, the first Sud Aviation Caravelle joined the JAT fleet. In 1969, the first McDonnell Douglas DC-9-32 (of 16) arrived, followed by Boeing 707 in 1970, McDonnell Douglas DC-10 in 1971 (of 7), and in 1974 by the first two (of nine) Boeing 727-200s.

=== 1970s ===
Long-haul routes to North America, Australia, and the Far East were flown by Boeing 707s, introduced in 1970.

In 1975, Belgrade was connected with Karachi, Singapore and Sydney. Same year three brand new Boeing 727s were introduced. In 1976 fleet consisted of 4 Boeing 707, 13 McDonnell Douglas DC-9, 3 Boeing 727, 5 Caravelle and one Convair.

In 1976, two more Boeing 727s joined the fleet, for a total of five. The same year, Belgrade was connected with New York City, Malta, Baghdad, Kuwait City and Damascus. All Caravelles were withdrawn from the fleet, while the line to Karachi was terminated. That year JAT had almost three million passengers.

In 1977, new routes to Madrid and Lyon were introduced.

In 1978, a wide-body McDonnell Douglas DC-10-30 (which was chosen over the Boeing 747-200) was purchased to succeed the Boeing 707s on longer-haul routes, although the 707s remained in service into the 1980s on ad hoc charters and as scheduled-flight replacement aircraft. The purchase of a DC-10-30 was followed several years later by the purchase of a medium-range aircraft. The same year, a new route to Beijing was added.

In 1979, JAT carried almost 4 million passengers.

=== 1980s ===
In 1980, the route Belgrade–Chicago was established. Two more brand new Boeing 727s were added to the fleet.

In 1981, Cleveland was added as a stopover on route Belgrade–Chicago. The same year the JAT fleet counted 28 planes 2 DC-10, 13 DC-9, 4 Boeing 707 and 9 Boeing 727.

In 1983, Jat introduced new routes to Alger and Thessaloniki and ceasing route to Beijing.

In 1984, the Belgrade–Toronto route was established. Jat was the official carrier and sponsor of the 1984 Winter Olympics.

In 1985, JAT was the first European airline to purchase Boeing 737-300s. During those years, the company carried five million passengers annually and served 80 destinations on five continents (19 domestic, 45 medium-haul and 16 long haul routes). JAT also constructed a large hangar to accommodate wide-body aircraft and a jet-engine test stand at their Belgrade hub. The same year, Bombay and Calcutta were connected with Belgrade.

In 1987, Belgrade was connected with Melbourne, Perth, Montreal, Los Angeles, and Hong Kong. Profit that year was $205 million.

=== 1990s ===
In 1992, the Socialist Federal Republic of Yugoslavia broke apart, resulting in the Yugoslav Wars. JAT was forced to stop all domestic services. The United Nations imposed sanctions on 20 May 1992 against the Federal Republic of Yugoslavia (Serbia and Montenegro); for the first time since World War II, international transport was forcibly terminated. This was preceded by the decisions of Germany and Italy to interrupt any traffic with Yugoslavia: on 21 December 1991 — Germany, the largest market for JAT in Europe, with seven flights daily and 40& million German marks gross annual profit, followed by Italy on 10 January 1992. The United States imposed an embargo on air traffic with Yugoslavia on 2 May 1992: the last JAT flights to the United States were to Chicago and New York. JAT management decided to re-route North American long-range flights to Canada. However, Canada quickly followed and banned all JAT flights entering the country, terminating all JAT operations across the North Atlantic.

During that time, JAT operated only domestic services between Belgrade, Podgorica, Tivat, Niš, Priština and — for a very short time — Užice–Ponikve Airport. In 1994, JAT resumed some of their international services. In 1998, JAT ordered eight Airbus A319s. This was seen as a political stunt by the president, Slobodan Milošević. The original delivery date was June 2000, but this date had been postponed until a total of $23.5 million was paid off to Airbus while JAT was hoping to divert the deal to another airline. Soon after, all flights were canceled as Europe introduced a new ban and the Federal Republic of Yugoslavia was bombed for 78 days during the Kosovo War.

In April 2000, director general Žika Petrović was gunned down in front of his home in Belgrade.

=== 2000s ===
International sanctions were lifted in 2000, and JAT resumed regular flight services. To celebrate the move that coincided with the country restructuring from FR Yugoslavia to Serbia and Montenegro, JAT Yugoslav Airlines changed their name to Jat Airways on 8 August 2003. In 2004, Belgrade based Intair Link Airlines was merged into Jat, one year after Intair Link had begun service. Jat sold its last DC-10-30 on 24 June 2005 to France-based company TAT Industries. During 2005, the company also phased out all remaining Boeing 727s and DC-9s. The last airworthy DC-9-32 was leased to the United Arab Emirates company Eastern SkyJets.

By then, Jat Airways was not a member of any alliances or partnerships but did code share on some routes with Adria Airways, Aeroflot, Air France, Alitalia, Austrian Airlines, B&H Airlines, KLM, LOT Polish Airlines and TAROM.

Jat Airways introduced their online booking system in September 2006 and electronic tickets in April 2007. Jat Airways celebrated 80 years of service on 17 June 2007. In 2007 and 2008 the airline received an award as one of the five best brands from Serbia. They also received an award for their television advertisements celebrating 80 years of service. On 3 July 2008 the Jat Airways reestablished air links with neighbouring Croatia after a 17-year absence.

In 2012, Jat celebrated their 85th birthday and began refurbishing their cabins in both business and economy class, at the same time introducing a new frequent flyer program.

=== Privatization attempts ===
The government of Serbia made two unsuccessful attempts to privatize Jat Airways, in 2008 and 2011.

On 16 January 2008, the government of Serbia announced it would sell a 51% stake in the airline. The starting price for the airline's 51% share was €51 million, decreased from the earlier announced €150 million in order to increase interest. The tender was canceled after no company had submitted an offer following the deadline.

In 2011, the Serbian government announced that it would create a successor to Jat Airways with a strategic partner. The new airline would assume all of Jat's healthy assets, codeshare agreements, aircraft and airport slots. Baltic Aviation Systems was the only company to purchase the tender documentation but decided not to pursue the partnership further. The tender was again canceled due to a lack of interested buyers.

=== Strategic partnership with Etihad Airways ===
In March 2013, Serbia's Minister of Finance Mlađan Dinkić traveled to Abu Dhabi to propose that Etihad Airways take a stake in Jat in order to renew their fleet. In April it was confirmed that Etihad added Belgrade to their summer timetable as a part of the initiative to become a co-owner of Jat alongside the Serbian government. A purchase of a 49% stake in Jat by Etihad is widely suggested by observing media, which is dependent on whether a memorandum of understanding (MoU) is signed with the government of Serbia, possibly in May 2013. On 17 June 2013, an MoU was signed with Etihad and the Serbian government on exploring the possibility of an equity investment in Jat Airways.

On 1 August 2013, the Serbian Government and Etihad Airways formalised an agreement which will see a reorganisation and rebranding of the airline's operations to Air Serbia, an entity in which the Serbian Government will have a 51% stake and Etihad Airways will own 49%. Etihad Airways was also granted management rights over the carrier for an initial five-year period.

By then, Serbia had only one airline carrier, Jat Airways shareholding, a company with its own statute, Board of Directors and management bodies. Air Serbia is the result of a strategic partnership agreement between the Etihad Airways and Jat Airways, making the company to fulfill regulatory requirements, and got registered with the Business Registers Agency (APR). Subsequently, Jat Airways changed its name to Air Serbia and everything else was kept unchanged, continuing to be a joint stock company, the commercial entity registered in the APR, and with all the rights and obligations of Jat Airways. At that moment, Jat Airways was working at full power and fulfilling the obligations of regular and chartered passenger transportation, as agreed in its business plan for 2013.

== Liveries ==
=== Yugoslav Airlines ===
When the name Yugoslav Airlines first appeared on aircraft in 1950, the airline had a simple, mainly white livery. During these years there was a Yugoslav flag on the tail, and on the body the words Jugoslovenski Aerotransport. Shortly afterwards the airline changed its livery and added a logo on the tail section with a red shaped egg on the tail in which JAT was written in white, a logo kept for the rest of the SFR Yugoslavia period. The rest of the tail was blue, with Yugoslav Airlines written on the fuselage in red. There were variations of this livery during the 1960s, 1970s and 1980s. The biggest change in this period was when the first Boeing 737-300 aircraft arrived with a silver body, and were kept as such, with just logo and basic livery added.

=== JAT Yugoslav Airlines ===
The logo of the airline used from 1963 till 1994

With the reintroduction of international flights in 1994 after two years of economic sanctions, JAT introduced a new livery and corporate image. A "euro-white" livery was adopted and the centre-piece was a new tail logo which contained a stylized Yugoslav flag with the white colour being represented by a pair of white wings, the larger wing symbolizing Serbia and the smaller Montenegro. For the first time, the word JAT was written on the aircraft in small blue letters. The words Jugoslovenski Aerotransport were painted on the starboard side and Yugoslav Airlines on the port side and these were written in silver italic script. In 1996, the livery was slightly modified, with JAT being painted in billboard size at the front with a small Yugoslav flag in the "A" in JAT. During this time, as a result of the extensive leasing of aircraft by JAT, most aircraft lost the tail logo completely. The livery was updated again in 2001 with the flag in the billboard titles disappearing, and the words Yugoslav Airlines and Jugoslovenski Aerotransport being painted in blue using the same font as the main logo. Not all of the aircraft received this update as the livery was updated again with the introduction of the new name "Jat Airways".

=== Jat Airways ===
On 20 March 2003, the airline changed its name to Jat Airways. A national competition was held to design the new logo and livery. The winning design had three dots on the tail: blue, red and blue. The fuselage of the aircraft had a large Jat Airways title, with Jat in red and Airways in blue. The new logo was the name Jat Airways written with three dots in blue, red and blue following it. Jat Airways painted only one aircraft in these colours, a Boeing 737-300.

Jat started painting its aircraft all white and in 2006, most aircraft were white with a small Jat Airways logo. In December 2006 the airline decided to return to its dot livery. By August 2007, all aircraft had been painted. The livery is slightly different from the previous dot livery. It has the dots on the tail, but the small Jat titles remain rather than the big Jat Airways logo across the fuselage.

Jat Airways livery timeline

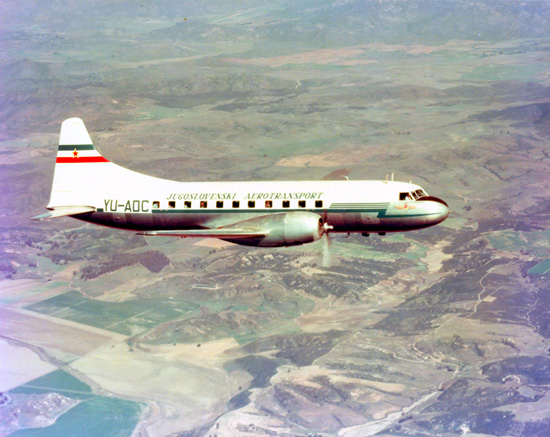
1950s–1963

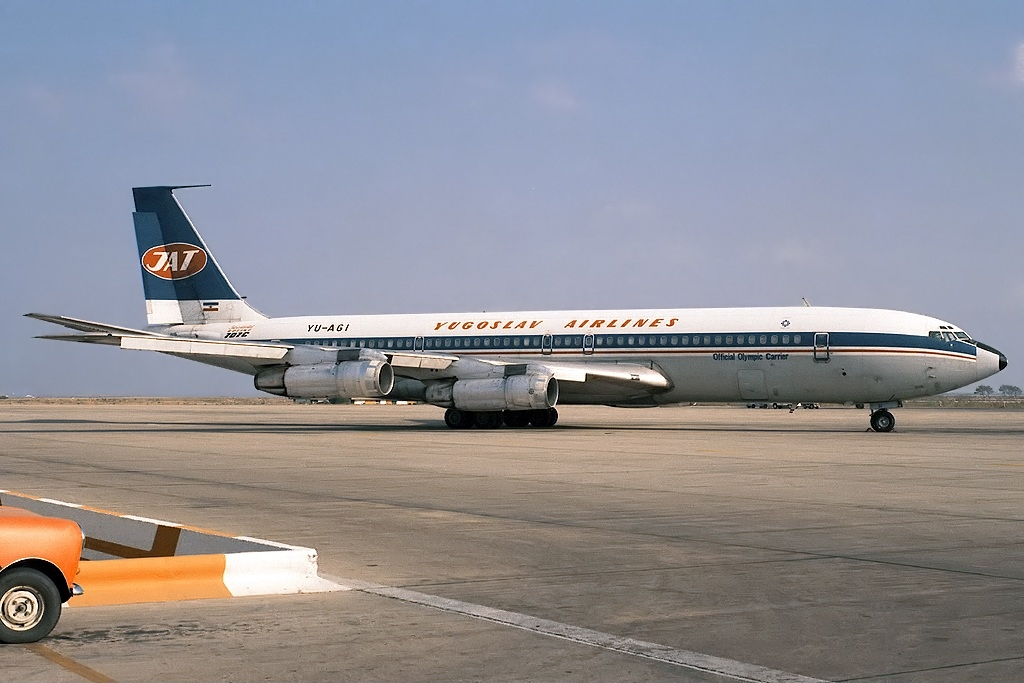
1963–1994

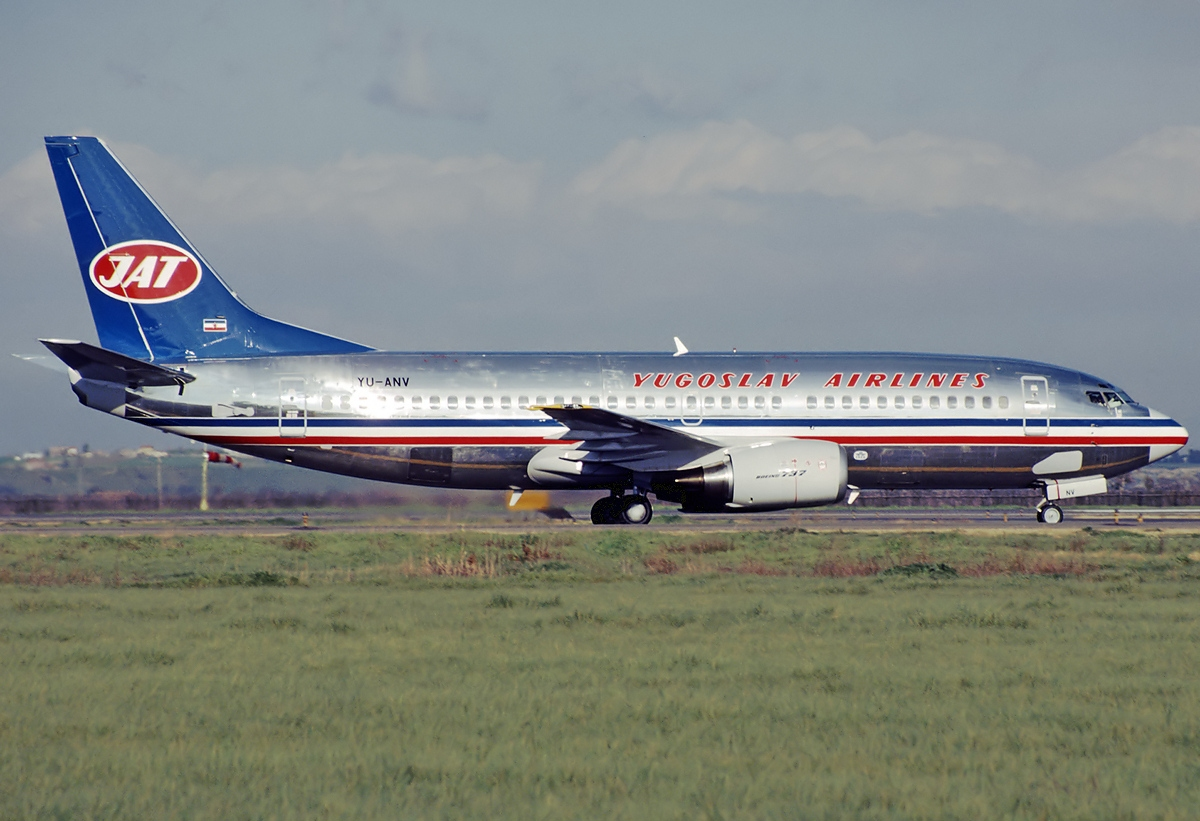
1963–1994
Special silver livery exclusive to 737 model

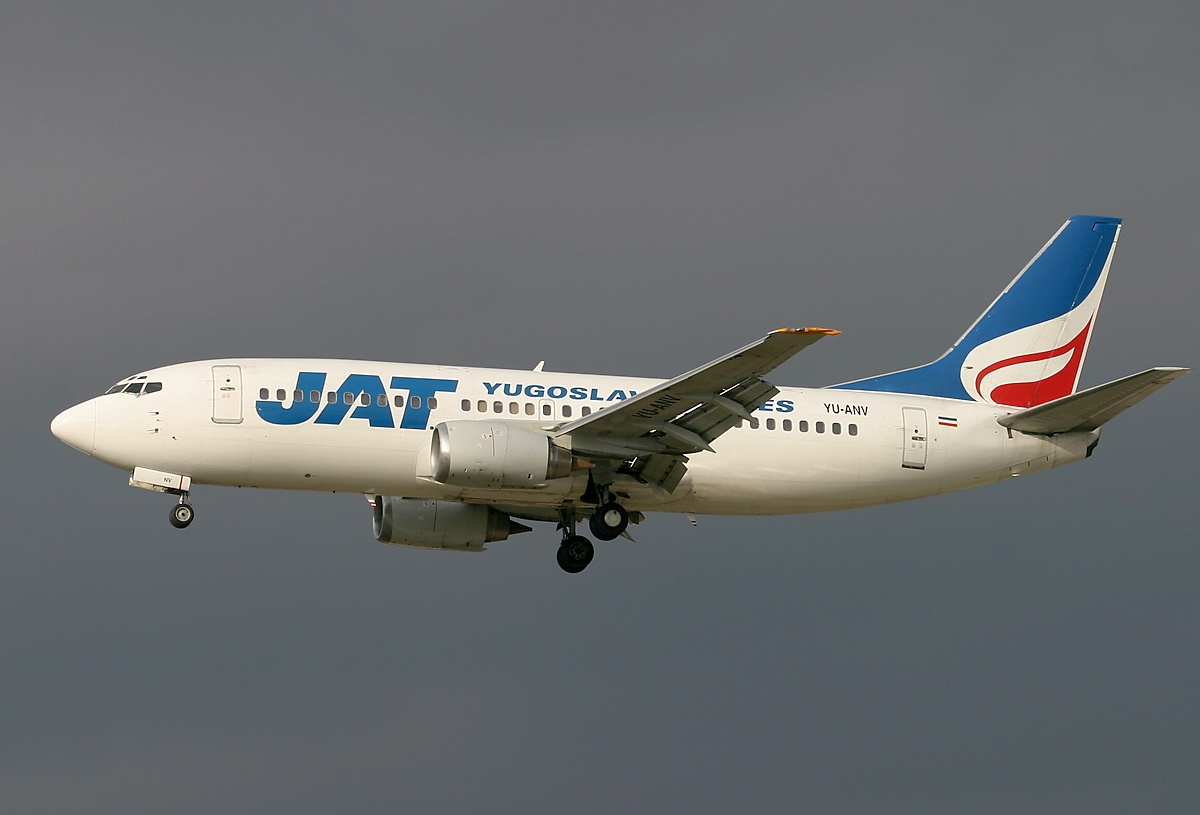
1994–2003

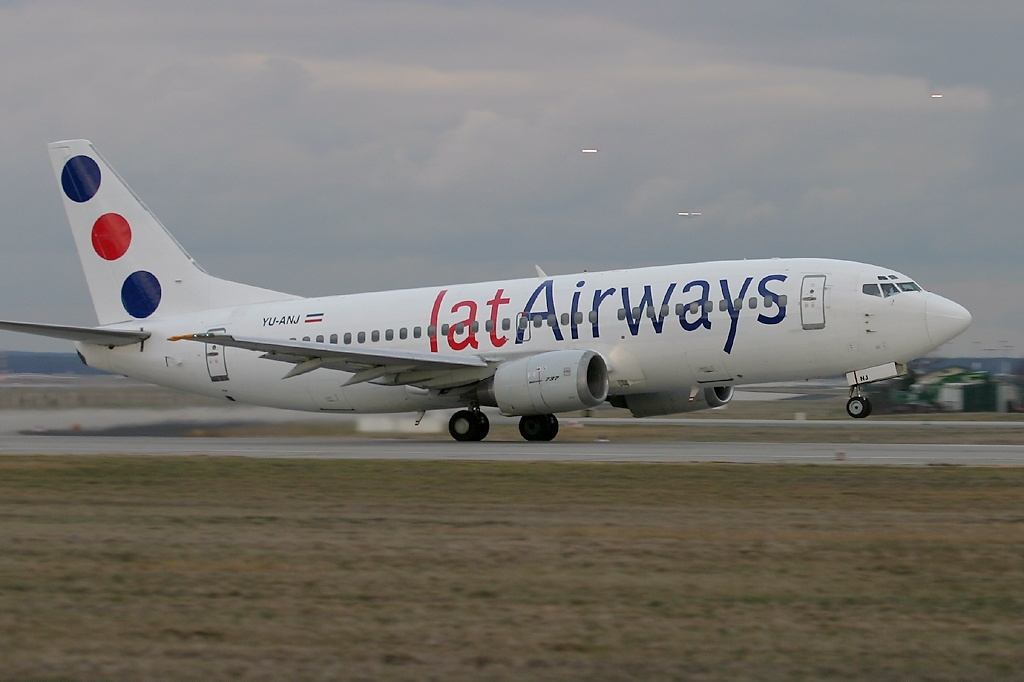
2003–2006

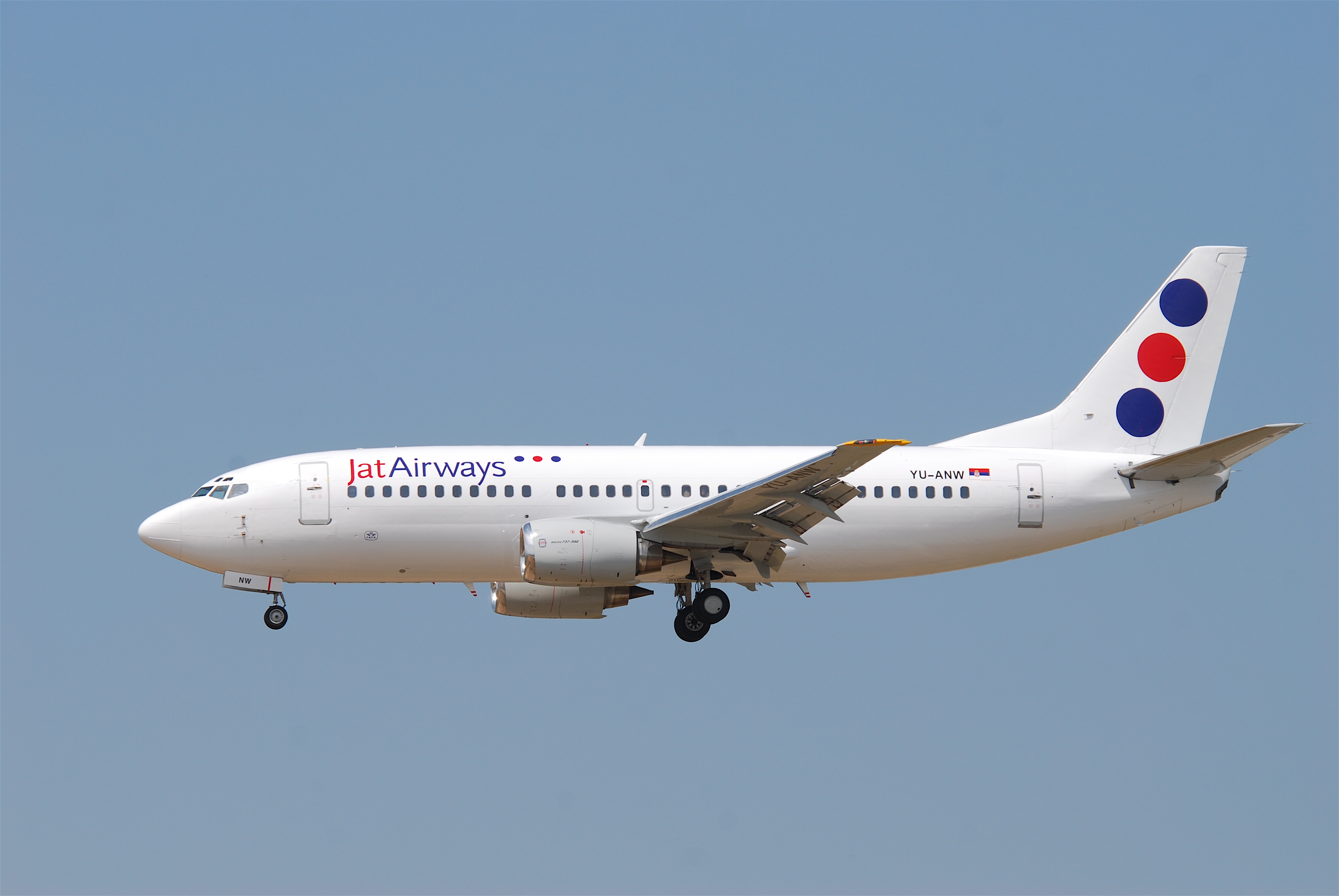
2006–2013

== Destinations ==
=== Codeshare agreements ===
Jat Airways had codeshare agreements with the following airlines:

- Adria Airways (Star Alliance)
- Aeroflot (SkyTeam)
- Air France (SkyTeam)
- Alitalia (SkyTeam)
- Austrian Airlines (Star Alliance)
- Etihad Airways
- KLM (SkyTeam)
- LOT Polish Airlines (Star Alliance)
- TAROM (SkyTeam)

== Services ==
=== Jat Catering ===
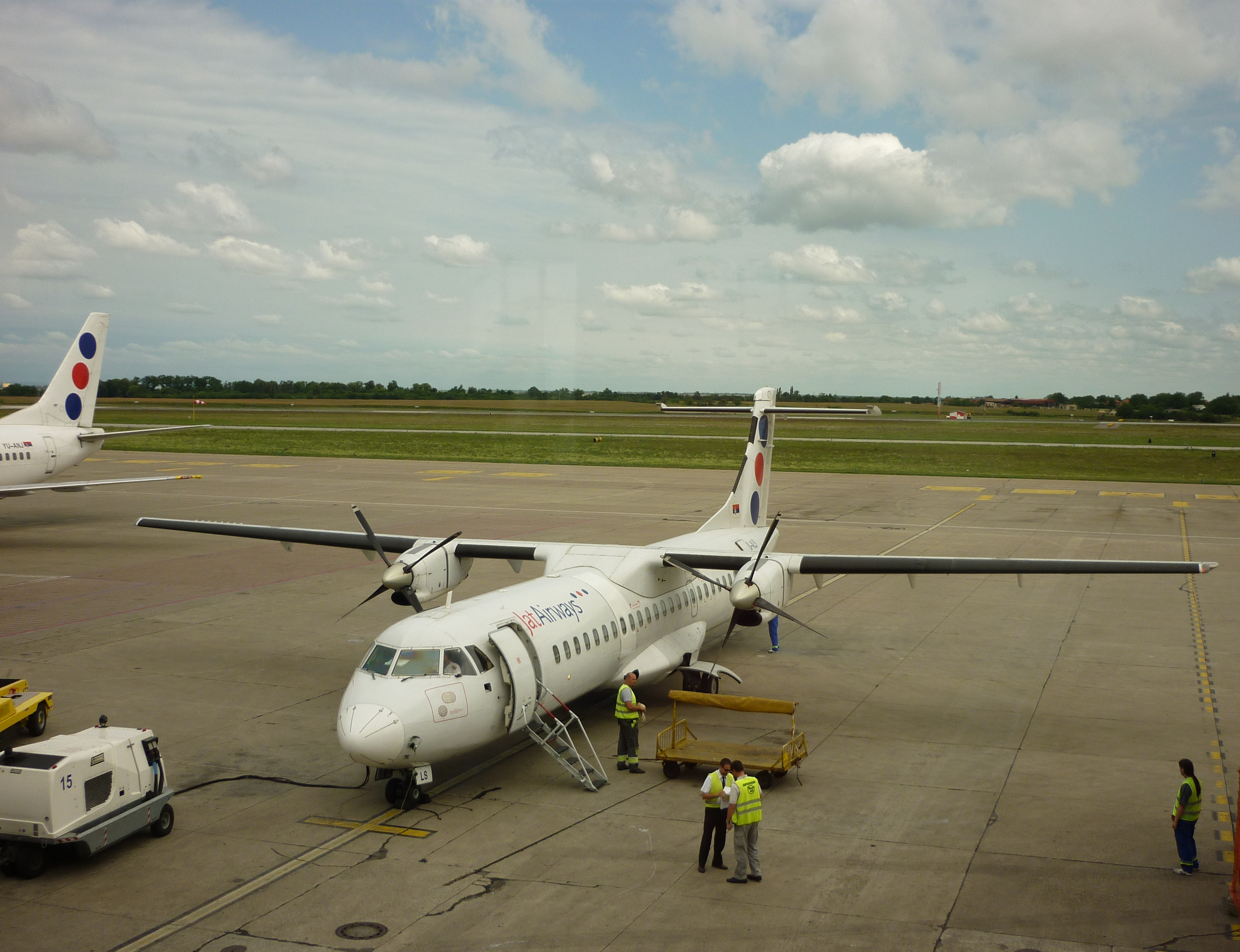
A Jat Airways ATR 72-201 at Belgrade Nikola Tesla Airport

Jat Catering is a subsidiary of Jat Airways, providing in-flight meals for Jat Airways. Jat Catering offices and kitchens are situated in the industrial area of Belgrade Nikola Tesla Airport. Jat Catering offers special meals for vegetarians, vegans and toddlers.

=== On board ===
The aircraft of Jat Airways are fitted out in a two-class configuration. In the Boeing aircraft, Jat has a business-class section and an economy-class section. On ATR 72 aircraft, the airline offers a one-class all economy configuration with the business class section, which used to be located in the back removed in mid-2008. Every passenger gets a complimentary copy of Jat's in-flight magazine "Jat Airways Review". All drinks, food and duty-free items are available during the flight.

- Jat Business Class

Includes copy of Jat Airways Review magazine, large black leather seats with limited reclining capabilities, and stowaway tray tables. From August 2012 the business class seats will be progressively replaced by economy class grey leather seats. However, the middle seat will be left unoccupied for greater leg space and comfort.

- Jat Economy Class

Includes copy of Jat Airways Review magazine, dark blue leather seats with limited reclining capabilities, and stowaway tray tables. From August 2012, the airline began refurbishing its Boeing 737-300 economy class section by replacing the seats with grey leather seating.

=== Frequent Flyer ===
"Extra Flight Club" is Jat Airways frequent-flyer program. The program works whereby passengers register each time they fly with Jat, gaining bonus points in return. After the appropriate number of points is collected, passengers are issued a free ticket.

=== Charters ===
Jat Airways organizes individual and group charter flights on all types of Jat Airways aircraft, both domestic and international. The users of this service include tourist agencies, sports teams and fans, artistic groups and ensembles, as well as participants of congresses and fairs. Most charters take place during the summer time to Greek, Turkish, Egyptian, Tunisian, Spanish, Italian, Portuguese, French and Bulgarian holiday resorts.

=== Freight ===
Jat Airways offers cargo services on all destinations in its network with special cargo only flights to Podgorica and Tivat in Montenegro, in addition to passenger flights as well.

=== Jat Tehnika ===
Legally a separate company from Jat Airways, Jat Tehnika provides services and maintenance for Jat's fleet and other airline companies, such as Jet2.com

== Fleet ==
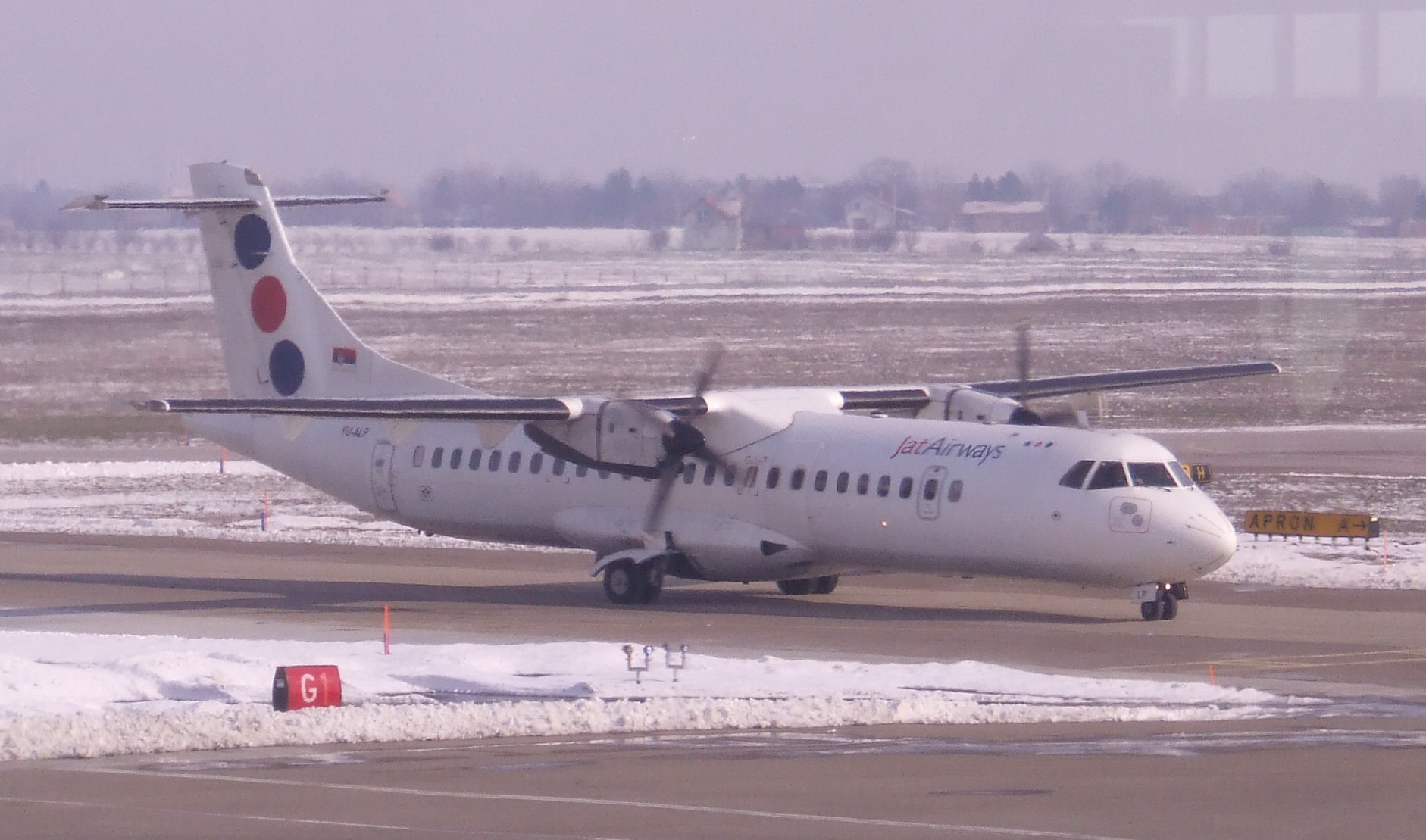
A Jat Airways ATR 72-202 at Belgrade Nikola Tesla Airport

At the time of rebranding and before ceasing operations under the old name in October 2013, the Jat Airways fleet consisted of the following aircraft:

Jat Airways fleet
Aircraft	In Fleet	Orders	Passengers			Notes
Aircraft	In Fleet	Orders	J	Y	Total	Notes
ATR 72-202	3	0	0	66	66	
ATR 72-500	2	0	0	70	70	
Boeing 737-300	10	0	8	126	134	Two units are stored for spare parts.
Boeing 737-300	2	0	12	110	122	Leased from Bulgaria Air
Total	17	0				

=== Historical fleet ===
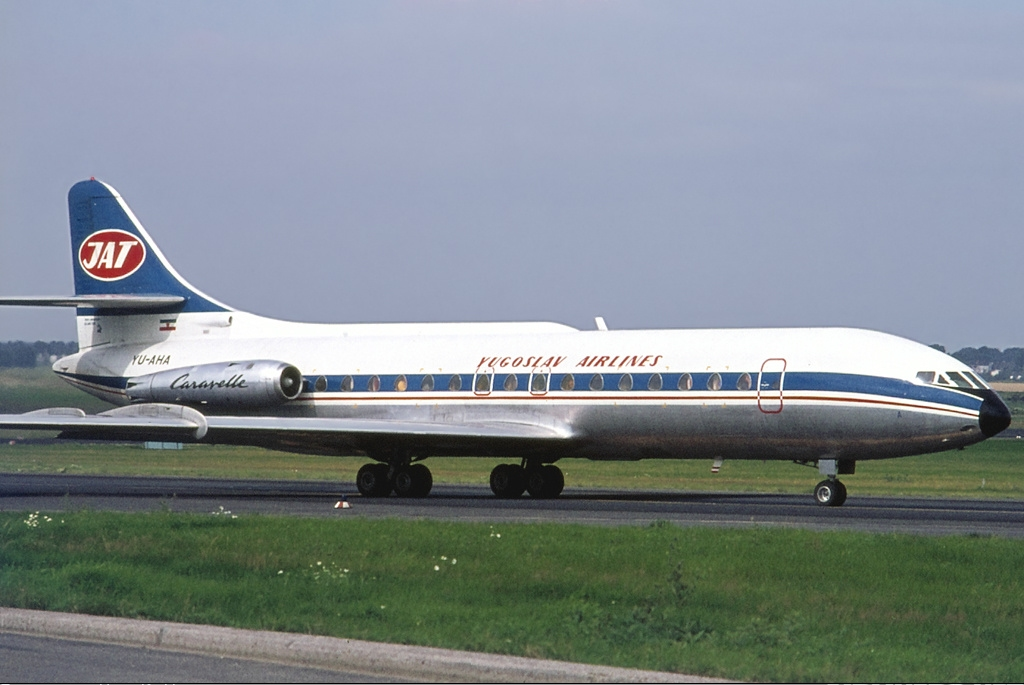
A JAT Sud Aviation SE-210 Caravelle VI-N at Düsseldorf Airport, June 1973

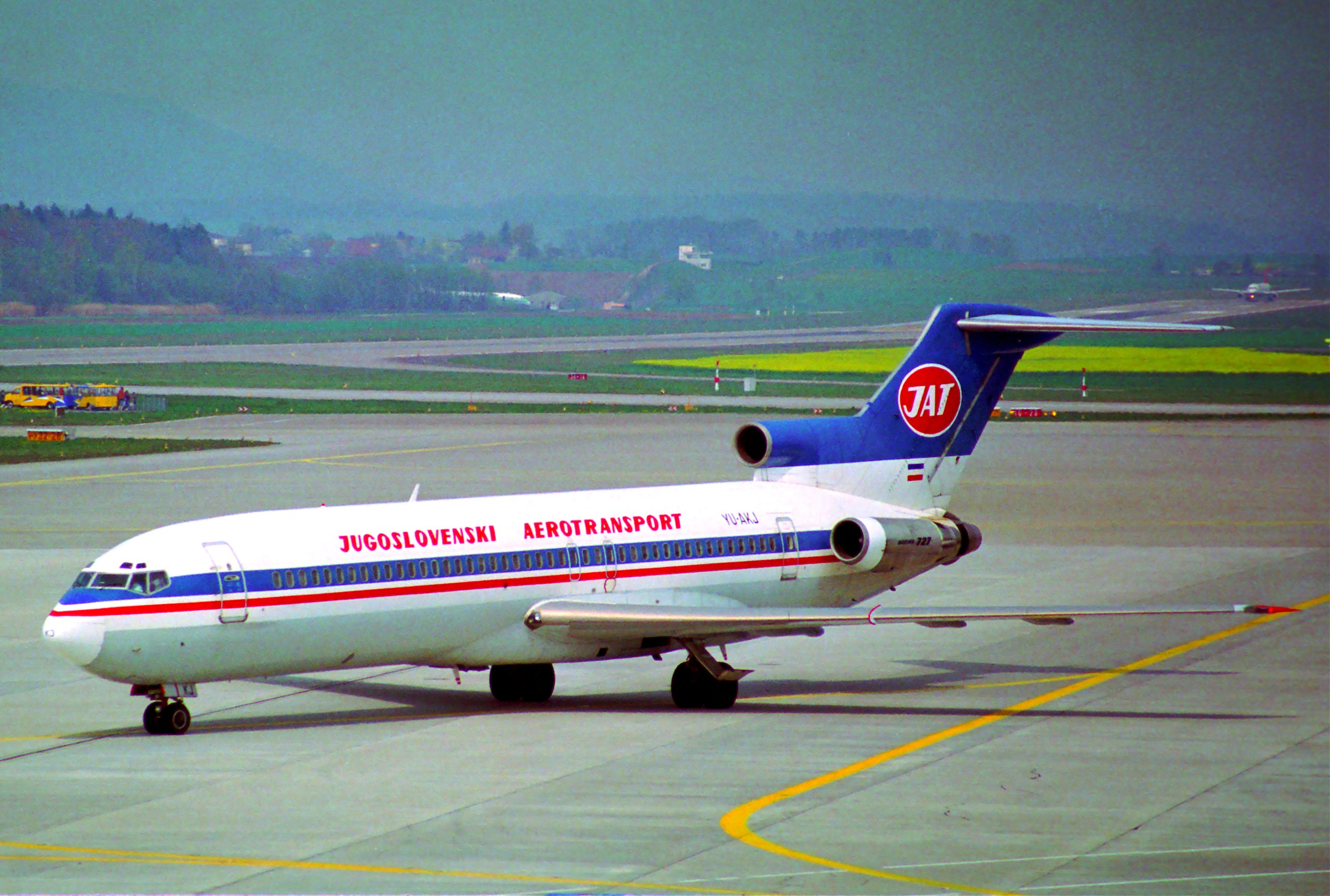
JAT Yugoslav Airlines Boeing 727 with a classic livery at Zurich Airport, 1995

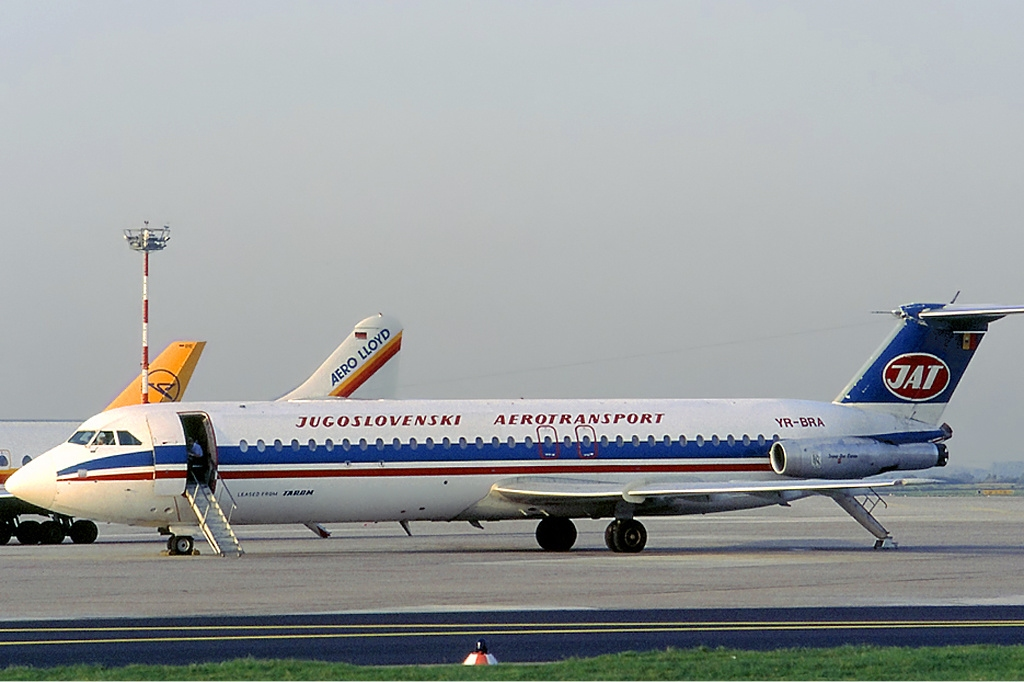
JAT Yugoslav Airlines BAC One-Eleven at Düsseldorf Airport, November 1989

Over the years, Jat Airways (JAT Yugoslav Airlines) has operated the following aircraft types:

JAT Yugoslav Airlines and Jat Airways historical fleet since 1947
Aircraft	Introduced	Retired	Notes
ATR 42-300	1987	1990	
ATR 72-201	1991	2011	
Boeing 707-300C	1971	1988	
Boeing 707-321	1970s	1980s	
Boeing 707-340C	1970s	1980s	
Boeing 707-351C	1970s	1980s	
Boeing 727-200	1974	2005	
Boeing 737-300	1985	2021	Retired on 17 February 2021
Boeing 737-400	2003	2010	Leased from Air One and US Airways
Convair CV-340	1950s	1960s	
Convair CV-440 Metropolitan	1950s	1960s	
Douglas C-47 Skytrain	1947	1950s	
Douglas DC-3	1947	1950s	
Douglas DC-6B	1958	1975	Personal transport of Josip Broz Tito
Ilyushin Il-14M	1950s	1960s	
Junkers Ju 52	1947	1950s	
Lockheed L-1011-500 TriStar	1989	1989	Leased from Royal Jordanian
McDonnell Douglas DC-9-32	1969	2005	
McDonnell Douglas DC-10-30	1978	2005	
Rombac 1-11-561RC	1990	1990	Leased from TAROM
Sud Aviation SE-210 Caravelle VI-N	1963	1976	

== Miscellaneous ==
The Aeroput MMS-3 (reg. as YU-SAR) became the first passenger aircraft designed and made in Serbia in 1934 under Aeroput's brand name. Also Aeroput ordered two Spartan Cruiser II aircraft and a licence to build further aircraft of the same type. In 1935 one Cruiser II (reg. as YU-SAP) was built under Spartan's licence for Aeroput by Zmaj aircraft company in Zemun.

In 1953, JAT began organizing their flights with the introduction of flight codes. The first code, JU720 was used on the Belgrade - Zagreb - Ljubljana route, while the return flight took the code JU721.

Towards the end of August 1959, JAT transported its millionth passenger since the founding of the company back in 1927.

Former JAT flight attendant, Vesna Vulović, holds the world record in surviving the highest free fall with no parachute, when she fell from 10,160 metres (33,330 feet) after the aircraft she was on, was destroyed by a ustashes terrorist bomb.

A JAT Boeing 707-321 (YU-AGA) flew around the world. Commencing on 10 November 1974, the flight took 19 days to complete, flying: Belgrade - Beirut - Bombay - Singapore - Tokyo - Honolulu - Los Angeles - New York - London - Belgrade.

On 13 February 1978, Marija Todev gave birth in a Boeing 707 (YU-AGI) at Jat flight Belgrade - Sydney. The boy was named "Jatko".

In 1978, a wide body McDonnell Douglas DC-10-30 (which was chosen over the Boeing 747-200) was purchased to succeed the Boeing 707s on the longer-haul routes, although the 707s stayed in service into the 1980s on ad hoc charters and as scheduled-flight replacement aircraft.

On 16 February 1979, the first-ever picture auction in world aviation history is held in JAT DC-10 (YU-AMA) on a scheduled Belgrade - Zagreb - New York flight.

Jat Airways was the first operator of the Boeing 737-300 aircraft in Europe. It arrived at the Belgrade Nikola Tesla Airport on 8 August 1985 as YU-AND. This aircraft was withdrawn from service in February 2020 and is awaiting to be preserved.

Jat Airways was to become the first operator of the McDonnell Douglas MD-11 aircraft. However, due to the break-up of Yugoslavia and the imposition of sanctions on Serbia, the aircraft were never delivered.

In 1985, a JAT Yugoslav Airlines flight picked up Abu Abbas in Rome, Italy as he sought political asylum in Yugoslavia after U.S. authorities requested his arrest.

In 2002, the company utilized its fleet for UN missions in the Democratic Republic of the Congo during the Second Congo War.

JAT began its anti-smoking campaign with ban smoking on its domestic flights in 1987. From 5 April 2002 is prohibited smoking on all Jat flights.

In 2004, Jat Airways was named one of the safest airlines in Europe by the IATA. Jat Airways pilots are considered among the best trained pilots in the world.

The body of former president Slobodan Milošević was transported to Serbia for burial on a Jat Airways regular commercial flight from Amsterdam on 15 March 2006.

Since 1994, Jat Airways has used the following slogans: In safe hands (U sigurnim rukama) [2010–present], The best fly with Jat (Najbolji lete „Jatom“) [2007–2010] and More than Flying (Više od letenja) [1994–2007]

On 19 January 2008, in Jat's Boeing 737-300 plane on the regular line Belgrade - Stockholm, at an altitude of 10,000 meters married Birgitta Berglund from Sweden and Predrag Marković from Serbia. The newlyweds with champagne, St. George's poem (Djurdjevdan), a cake, applause and congratulations of 117 passengers on the flight JU374, fateful said "yes" in the presence of the godfathers Lela Ristić from Jat Media Center and Vesna Jovanović, stewardess – purser.

== Accidents and incidents ==
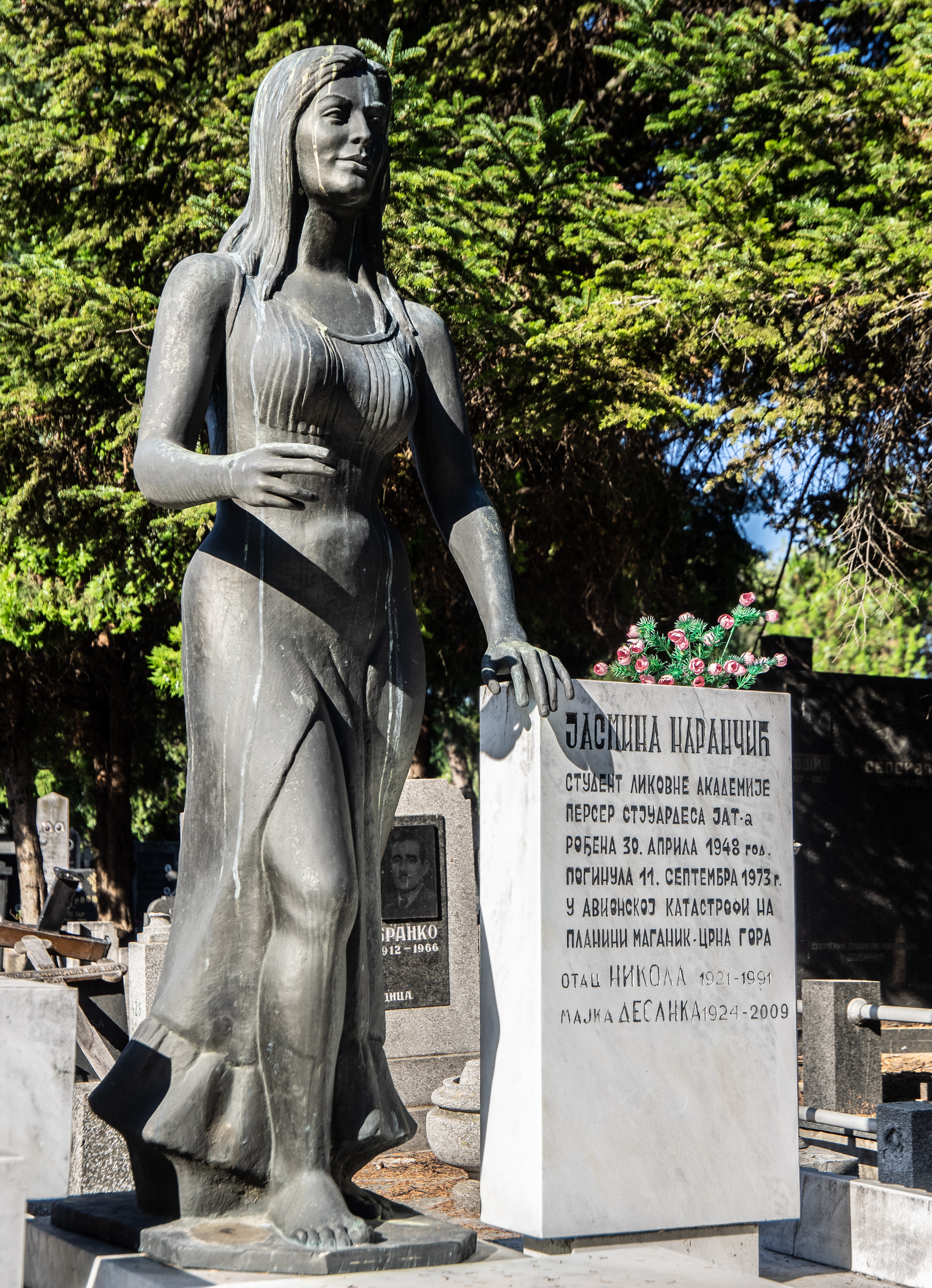
Grave of flight attendant Jasmina Karančić who died on 11 September 1973 accident

Fatal
Date	Aircraft type	Fatalities	Description
21 September 1950	Douglas C-47A-25-DK YU-ABC	10/11	The aircraft struck Mount Medvednica while on approach to Lučko Airport. All except one of the 11 onboard were killed, the sole survivor being the radio operator of the flight, Nikola Jovanović.
29 June 1951	Avions Amiot AAC.1 Toucan (Ju 52) YU-ACE	14/14	The aircraft struck Mount Risnjak shortly after takeoff from Rijeka Airport, all 14 occupants killed.
22 October 1951	Douglas C-47A-20-DK YU-ACC	12/12	The aircraft crashed on approach to Skopje Airport, none of the 12 onboard survived.
10 October 1955	Convair CV-340-58 YU-ADC	7/29	The aircraft struck Mount Kahlenberg while on approach to Vienna Airport. Among the 29 occupants onboard, the captain and 6 passengers received fatal injuries.
22 December 1956	Convair CV-340-58 YU-ADA	3/30	The aircraft crashed on approach to Munich-Riem Airport. There were 3 fatalities out the 30 occupants, the captain, a flight attendant, and a passenger did not survive.
26 January 1972	McDonnell Douglas; DC-9-32; YU-AHT	27/28	Flight JU 367, McDonnell Douglas DC-9-32 was destroyed in flight following an explosion, later suspected to have been a terrorist act. Of the 28 passengers and crew members on board, 27 died, with flight attendant Vesna Vulović being the sole survivor.
11 September 1973	Sud Aviation SE-210 Caravelle VI-N; YU-AHD	41/41	Flight JU 769 was JAT's last accident with loss of life. The aircraft struck the Babin Zub peak on Maganik mountain near Podgorica, at 6,300 feet while descending from 9,000 to 6,000 feet in IMC conditions on flight from Skopje to Titograd (today known as Podgorica), killing all 41 passengers and crew members on board. Allegedly, the flight was instructed to start descent, although the aircraft was not visible on radar (which were allegedly not working well at the time) nor could the control tower staff on Podgorica Airport make visual contact with the aircraft. At the time of the flight, there weren't any qualified staff at the control tower in Podgorica.

Non-fatal
Date	Aircraft type	Fatalities	Description
23 November 1974	McDonnell Douglas DC-9-32; YU-AJN	None	The aircraft crashed 1 mile short of the runway after losing visual contact while on an approach at Belgrade Surčin Airport. None of the 50 passengers were hurt.
16 August 1980	Boeing 707-340C; YU-AGG	None	The aircraft overran Stockholm's Arlanda Airport runway 26 while landing in a thunderstorm blowing several tyres and receiving mud in all 4 engines. There were no fatalities in the incident.
4 October 2009	Boeing 737-300; YU-ANV	None	The aircraft overran Istanbul's Atatürk Airport runway while landing en route from Belgrade by 50 metres. All 125 passengers and six crew were safely evacuated.

== General directors (1990–2013) ==
- Tomislav Stojčić (1990)
- Miodrag Vasiljević (1 December 1990 – 22 June 1991)
- Živko Markićević (23 June 1991 – 4 March 1992)
- Žika Petrović (5 March 1992 – 24 April 2000)
- Mihajlo Vujinović (5 July 2000 – 19 April 2001)
- Dušan Kostić (24 April 2001 – 26 October 2001)
- Predrag Vujović (26 October 2001 – 25 March 2004)
- Aleksandar Milutinović (25 March 2004 – 18 February 2005)
- Nebojša Starčević (18 February 2005 – 25 October 2007) (acting to 28 September 2006)
- Saša Vlaisavljević (25 October 2007 – 2 July 2009)
- Srđan Radovanović (2 July 2009 – 8 December 2010)
- Vladimir Ognjanović (8 December 2010 – 8 May 2013) (acting)
- Velibor Vukašinović (8 May 2013 – 11 September 2013) (acting)
- Dane Kondić (11 September 2013 – 26 October 2013)

== See also ==
- Aeroput
- Air Yugoslavia
- Air transport in Serbia

== Bibliography ==
- JAT 20 years. Zagreb: Informator. 1970.
- This is JAT. Beograd: JAT-Yugoslav Airlines. 1990.
