= 466th Light Combat Aviation Squadron =

466th Light Combat Aviation Squadron: 466. eskadrila lake borbene avijacije
- Active: 1973 – 1982
- Disbanded: 1982
- Country: Yugoslavia
- Branch: Yugoslav Air Force
- Type: Squadron
- Role: Training; Light Combat
- Part of: 5th Aviation Corps

The 466th Light Combat Aviation Squadron (Serbo-Croatian: 466. eskadrila lake borbene avijacije / 466. ескадрила лаке борбене авијације) was an aviation squadron of the Yugoslav Air Force formed by order from March 7, 1978 at Cerklje military air base as part of the 82nd Aviation Brigade.

The squadron was formed with 467th Light Combat Aviation Squadron from 460th Light Combat Aviation Squadron equipment, domestic-made Soko J-20 Kraguj counter-insurgency aircraft. By order from November 1976, in 1978 squadron has been dislocated to Lučko airfield and it was reattached to 5th Aviation Corps as independent squadron.

The squadron was disbanded by order from April 15, 1982. In its place, the 711th Anti-Armored Helicopter Squadron was formed.

== Assignments ==
- 82nd Aviation Brigade (1973-1978)
- 5th Aviation Corps (1978-1982)

== Bases stationed ==
- Cerklje (1973–1978)
- Lučko (1978-1982)

== Equipment ==
- Soko J-20 Kraguj (1973–1982)
