= 245th Fighter-Bomber Aviation Squadron =

Squadron of Yugoslav Air Force

245th Fighter-Bomber Aviation Squadron: 245. lovačko-bombarderska avijacijska eskadrila
- Active: 1953 – 1954; 1956 - 1990
- Disbanded: 1954; 1990
- Country: Yugoslavia
- Branch: Yugoslav Air Force
- Type: Squadron
- Role: Ground Attack; Training; Light Combat
- Part of: 701st Aviation Brigade
- Garrison/HQ: Tuzla Air Base

The 245th Fighter-Bomber Aviation Squadron (Serbo-Croatian: 245. lovačko-bombarderska avijacijska eskadrila / 245. ловачко-бомбардерска авоијацијска ескадрила) was an aviation squadron of Yugoslav Air Force formed in 1953 at Batajnica airfield as Training Squadron of 44th Aviation Division (Serbo-Croatian: Trenažna eskadrila 44. vazduhoplovne divizije / Тренажна ескадрила 44. ваздухопловне дивизије).

== History ==
Squadron was part of 44th Aviation Division. It was equipped with Soviet-made Yak-9U trainer-fighters and Yugoslav-made Ikarus S-49A fighters. It was disbanded in 1954, and again formed in 1956, being equipped with domestic Aero-2 trainers and US-build T-33A Shooting Star jet-trainer aircraft.

In 1959 due to the Drvar reorganization this squadron became Light Combat Aviation Squadron of 1st Air Command (Serbo-Croatian: Vazduhoplovna eskadrila lake borbene avijacije 1. vazduhoplovne komande / Ваздухопловна ескадрила лаке борбене авијације 1. ваздухопловне команде).

Squadron was again renamed and renumbered in April 1961 as 460th Light Combat Aviation Squadron (Serbo-Croatian: 460. eskadrila lake borbene avijacije / 460. ескадрила лаке борбене авијације). In same year new Soko 522 trainer aircraft have been introduced replacing T-33A and Aero 2 aircraft. Soko 522 trainers were replaced with Soko J-20 Kraguj counter-insurgency aircraft during the 1967. From 1965 squadron is part of 109th Fighter-Bomber Aviation Regiment being moved to Cerklje Air Base in 1964.

In June 1973 squadron has been reorganized. Its equipment was given to newly formed 466th and 467th Light Combat Aviation Squadron. From August 29, 1973, squadron is designated as 460th Fighter-Bomber Aviation Squadron' (Serbo-Croatian: 460. lovačko-bombarderska avijacijska eskadrila / 460. ловачко-бомбардерска авоијацијска ескадрила), being equipped with new domestic-made Soko J-21 Jastreb light-attack jet aircraft. From April 7, 1975, the squadron was renumbered as the 245th Fighter-Bomber Aviation Squadron per the number chronology order.

In 1980, by order from May 5, squadron has moved from Cerklje to Mostar airport, being assigned to Center for training of foreign armed forces pilots. Jastreb attack jets were replaced with G-2 Galeb trainer-light attack jet aircraft. Main task of squadron was training of Libyan Air Force pilots. With the center being disbanded in 1988, 245th Squadron has been attached to 107th Aviation Regiment in short period from March to September. In September 1988, the squadron has become part of the 701st Aviation Brigade, together with 252nd Fighter-Bomber Aviation Squadron and 350th Reconnaissance Aviation Squadron.

In 1990 with the 701st Aviation Brigade being disbanded, the 245th Fighter-Bomber Aviation Squadron also ceased to exist. In fact, its personnel and equipment were attached to 240th Fighter-Bomber Aviation Squadron.

== Assignments ==
- 44th Aviation Division (1953–1954, 1956-1959)
- 1st Air Command (1959–1964)
- 109th Fighter-Bomber Aviation Regiment (1965)
- 16th Aviation Brigade (1966)
- 82nd Aviation Brigade (1966-1980)
- Center for training of foreign armed forces pilots (1980-1988)
- 107th Aviation Regiment (1988)
- 701st Aviation Brigade (1988-1990)

== Previous designations ==
- Training Squadron of 44th Aviation Division (1953-1954, 1956-1959)
- Light Combat Aviation Squadron of 1st Air Command (1959–1961)
- 460th Light Combat Aviation Squadron (1961-1975)
- 460th Fighter-Bomber Aviation Squadron (1973-1975)
- 245th Fighter-Bomber Aviation Squadron (1975-1990)

== Bases stationed ==
- Batajnica (1953–1954, 1956-1964)
- Pleso (1964)
- Cerklje (1964–1980)
- Mostar (1980–1990)

== Equipment ==
- Yakovlev Yak-9U (1953–1954)
- Ikarus S-49A (1953-1954)
- T-33A Shooting Star (1956-1961)
- Ikarus Aero 2B/C (1956–1961)
- Soko 522 (1961-1967)
- Soko J-20 Kraguj (1967-1973)
- J-21 Jastreb (1973-1980)
- G-2 Galeb (1980-1990)
