= 88th Fighter-Bomber Aviation Regiment =

88th Fighter-Bomber Aviation Regiment: 88. lovačko-bombarderski avijacijski puk
- Active: 1947 - 1964
- Disbanded: 1964
- Country: Yugoslavia
- Branch: Yugoslav Air Force
- Size: 2 aviation squadrons
- Part of: 1st Air Command

The 88th Fighter-Bomber Aviation Regiment (Serbo-Croatian: 88. lovačko-bombarderski avijacijski puk / 88. ловачко-бомбардерски авијацијски пук) was a Yugoslavian aviation regiment established in 1947 as 43rd Bomber Aviation Regiment (Serbo-Croatian: 43. vazduhoplovni bombarderski puk / 43. ваздухопловни бомбардерски пук).

== History ==
=== 43rd Bomber Aviation Regiment ===
The 43rd Bomber Aviation Regiment was formed on 3 November 1947 at Sombor with former Bulgarian Air Force Soviet made Petlyakov Pe-2 bombers. It was part of 4th Aviation Bomber Division.

By 1948 this regiment was renamed like all other units of Yugoslav Army, so it became the 88th Bomber Aviation Regiment.

The commander of regiment was Drago Krivokapić and commissar was Živko Ranisavljević.

=== 88th Regiment ===
The 88th Bomber Aviation Regiment was based at Sombor airfield until 1949, when it was dislocated to Velika Gorica/Pleso airport. By year 1959 it has moved to Batajnica Air Base. It was armed with Soviet Pe-2 bombers until 1952 when they were replaced with British made Mosquito Mk 6. Mosquitos were replaced with domestic Ikarus S-49C fighters by year 1957.

By the 1961 and application of the "Drvar" reorganization for the Air Force, new type designation system is used to identify squadrons, so the two squadrons of 103rd Reconnaissance Aviation Regiment have become 235th and 236th Fighter-Bomber Aviation Squadron.

It was disbanded by the 1964 year at Batajnica. Its 236th Fighter-Bomber Aviation Squadron was also disbanded, while the 235th Fighter-Bomber Aviation Squadron has been independent in the 1st Aviation Corps and later attached to 98th Aviation Brigade.

The commanders of regiment were Mića Marijanović, Spasen Zarevski, Miljenko Lipovščak, Ante Sardelić, Nikola Žutić, Tomaš Samardžić, Stojan Mutić, Borivoje Petkov and Stevan Leka.

== Assignments ==
- 4th Aviation Bomber Division (1947-1948)
- 32nd Aviation Division (1948-1959)
- 1st Air Command (1959–1964)

== Previous designations ==
- 43rd Bomber Aviation Regiment (1947-1948)
- 88th Bomber Aviation Regiment (1948-1957)
- 88th Fighter Aviation Regiment (1957-1960)
- 88th Fighter-Bomber Aviation Regiment (1960-1964)

== Organization ==
=== 1961-1964 ===
- 88th Fighter-Bomber Aviation Regiment
  - 235th Fighter-Bomber Aviation Squadron
  - 236th Fighter-Bomber Aviation Squadron

== Bases stationed ==
- Sombor (1947-1949)
- Velika Gorica/Pleso (1949-1959)
- Batajnica (1959-1964)

== Commanding officers ==
Date appointed	Name
	Drago Krivokapić
	Nikola Đurđević
	Dušan Grubor
	Marijan Vilman
	Ljubo Frankl
	Ismet Kulenović

== Equipment ==
- Petlyakov Pe-2 (1947–1952)
- de Havilland Mosquito Mk 6 (1952–1957)
- Ikarus S-49C (1957-1959)
- F-84G Thunderjet (1959-1964)
