= 117th Fighter Aviation Regiment =

117th Fighter Aviation Regiment: 117. lovački avijacijski puk
- Active: 1944–1992
- Disbanded: 1992
- Country: Soviet Union; Yugoslavia
- Branch: Soviet Air Force; Yugoslav Air Force
- Type: Regiment
- Part of: 5th Corps of Air Force and Air Defense
- Engagements: World War II (Syrmian Front); Yugoslav wars

The 117th Fighter Aviation Regiment (Serbo-Croatian: 117. lovački avijacijski puk / 117. ловачки авијацијски пук) was a unit established in 1944 as the 112th Fighter Aviation Regiment (Serbo-Croatian: 112. vazduhoplovni lovački puk / 112. ваздухопловни ловачки пук). It was formed from Yugoslav partisan aviators, who were trained and equipped by the Soviet Air Force. The regiment was deployed in the Croatian War of Independence, and is believed to be responsible of the 1991 raid on Vrsar.

== History ==
=== 112th Fighter Aviation Regiment ===
The 112th Fighter Aviation Regiment was established on December 25, 1944, at Veliki Radinci, from Yugoslav partisan aviators with the Soviet Air Force 17th Air Army's 168th Guards Fighter Aviation Regiment (168.GIAP). It became independent from Soviet command and personnel in May 1945. The regiment was part of the 11th Aviation Fighter Division and it was equipped with Soviet Yak-1M fighter aircraft. The regiment took part in the liberation of Yugoslavia. During combat operations it was based at Veliki Radinci, Nadalj, Klenak, Mađarmečke Lučko airfields.

By 1945 new Yak-3 fighters had been introduced into service. After the war, the regiment moved briefly to Slovenia, being based at Ljubljana, but it returned to Pleso near Zagreb. From 1946 to 1947 it was re-located several times between Mostar, Ljubljana and Novi Sad, due to the crisis in the north-west of the country. It was based at Pula in 1947.

By 1948 the regiment was renamed like all other units of the Yugoslav Army, becoming the 117th Fighter Aviation Regiment.

The commanders of the regiment in this period were Sava Poljanec, Đuro Ivanišević, Mile Ćurgus, Radovan Daković, Mihajlo Nikolić and Nikola Lekić. The commissar was Mile Rodić.

=== 117th Fighter Aviation Regiment ===
The 117th Fighter Aviation Regiment remained at Pula in 1948, but that same year it moved to Cerklje, where it was to remain until 1949 when it was moved to Zemun, with the new task of defending the capital city Belgrade. In 1951 the regiment moved to the newly built Batajnica Air Base, where it remained until 1960.

The regiment was re-equipped with new domestically built Ikarus S-49A aircraft and was the first unit of the Yugoslav Air Force to operate the first Yugoslav post-war fighter. The aircraft were formally handed over by Marshal Josip Broz Tito on May 21, 1950. By 1953, the S-49s were replaced with US-built Republic F-84 Thunderjet fighter-bombers. The first pilot in the Yugoslav Air Force trained to fly the Thunderjet was Lieutenant Colonel Milorad Ivanović, commander of the 117th Regiment. In that period the unit was renamed the 117th Fighter-Bomber Aviation Regiment (Serbo-Croatian: 117. lovačko-bombarderski avijacijski puk / 117. ловачко-бомбардерски авијацијски пук). In 1956 the Thunderjets were replaced by which remained in service with the regiment until 1959 when they were replaced by F-86E Sabres. That same year the unit changed its name back to the 117th Fighter Aviation Regiment. By 1960 the regiment had left Batajnica and re-located to Pleso.

The "Drvar" reorganization came into effect as a new type of designation system used to identify squadrons. The two squadrons of the 83rd Fighter Aviation Regiment became the 124th and the 125th Fighter Aviation Squadrons in 1961.

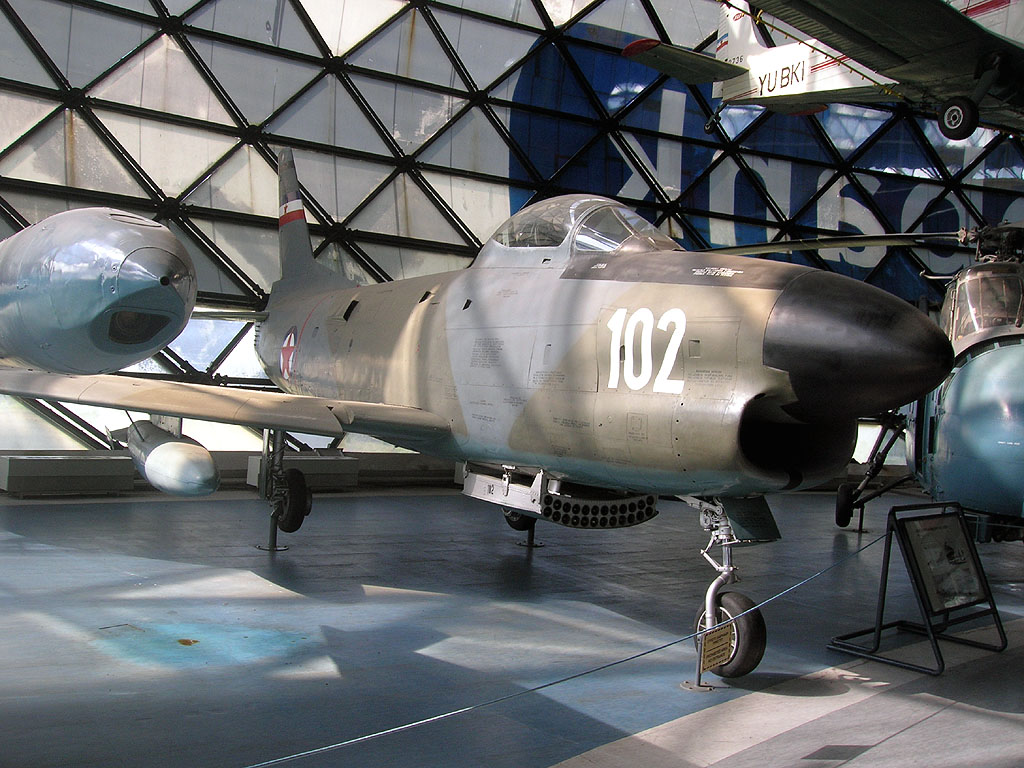
North American A F-86D Sabre jet fighter which served with the 117th Fighter Aviation Regiment from 1962 to 1964 and 1966 to 1968. It is now in the Belgrade Aviation Museum

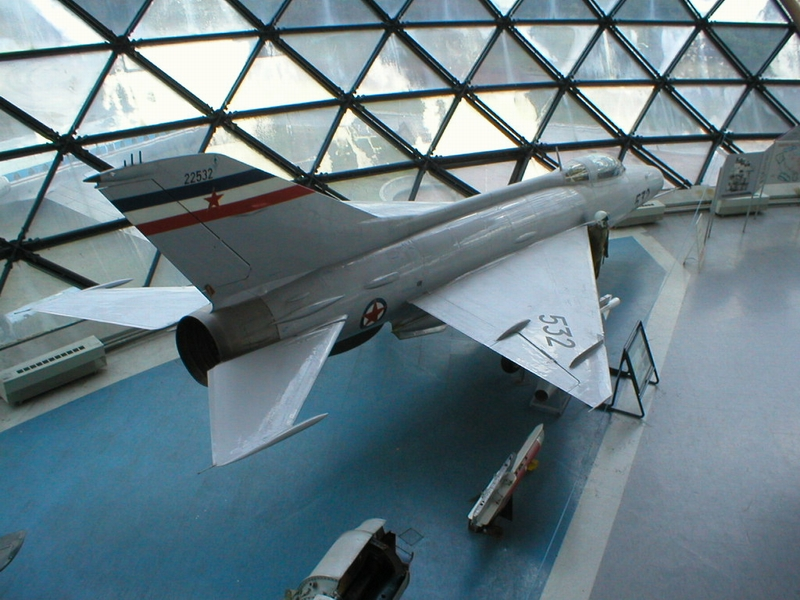
MiG-21A F-13 jet fighter which served with the 125th Fighter Aviation Squadron of the 117th Fighter Aviation Regiment from 1967 to 1971. It is now in the Belgrade Aviation Museum

The F-86Es were replaced by F-86D Sabres in 1963; they remained in service until 1968. In 1967 the first MiG-21F-13 fighters arrived as replacements for the Sabres. The following year, the regiment moved to Željava Air Base. It was the largest military airport with an underground hangar complex in Yugoslavia. This base remained the home of the regiment until 1991, when all Yugoslav People's Army units left the complex and it was destroyed. The 352nd Reconnaissance Aviation Squadron was detached from the 82nd Aviation Brigade to the 117th Regiment. It was equipped with MiG-21Rs, the reconnaissance version. MiG-21F-13s were replaced by MiG-21PMFs in 1970. Then new MiG-21bises were introduced as replacements for the MiG-21PMFs in 1983.

=== The regiment's war ===
The regiment saw action during the war in Croatia. The 351st Reconnaissance Aviation Squadron of the 82nd Aviation Brigade, armed with the IJ-22 Orao and the IJ-21 Jastreb reconnaissance attack aircraft, was re-located from Cerklje to Želajva, joining the 117th Regiment and was disbanded on August 30, 1991, with equipment and personnel integrated into the 352nd Reconnaissance Aviation Squadron. On August 30, 1991 MiG fighters intercepted a Boeing 707 with Ugandan registration, which was smuggling arms for the Croatian forces, and forced it to land. That aircraft was subsequently sequestered with its illegal cargo. Two weeks later, a Croatia Airlines DC-9 was forced to land at Split. When HQ of the 5th Corps at Zagreb was overtaken by Croatian forces on September 15, jets flew over the city. Several positions of the Croatian forces and a TV repeater tower were attacked in the next few days. On October 25, a pilot of the 352nd Reconnaissance Aviation Squadron, Croat Rudolf Perešin defected from Željava to Klagenfurt, Austria. He later joined the Croatian Air Force, but his MiG-21R, military registration 26112, remained in Austria.

The regiment is believed to have carried out the raid on Vrsar airport, which took place on December 21, 1991. The aircraft took off from Željava, and dropped on the poorly defended airport an assortment of 250 kg bombs, two to four cluster bombs, eight to twelve 127 mm lighting rockets, ninety to one hundred 23 mm cannon shells and twenty-five to thirty 57 mm missels, and a napalm bomb that did not activate.

On January 7, 1992, the Regiment's pilot Emir Šišić downed a helicopter of the European Community Monitor Mission after it entered Croatian air space. As a reaction, the Chief of the General staff, commander of the Yugoslav Air Force in that period, Lieutenant-General Zvonko Jurjević was suspended.

On February 4 another pilot, Danijel Borović, defected in a MiG-21bis. That aircraft was the first MiG of the Croatian Air Force. Borovic provided information to the Croatian media that the pilot who shot the AB-205 down was Emir Šišić.

Battles around Želajva airbase became more intense as the war in Bosnia and Herzegovina accelerated. After the order for the withdrawal of the Yugoslav People's Army from Bosnia in the spring of 1992, the 117th Regiment left Željava on April 22–24. The base was used for the evacuation of remaining personnel and families of Army members by air from Bihać. The underground complex never used again; it was destroyed in May. Squadrons of the regiment moved to Ponikve Airport in Serbia, where the 125th squadron of the 117th regiment was disbanded. The 124th Fighter Aviation Squadron was attached to the 83rd Aviation Brigade and the 352nd Reconnaissance Aviation Squadron assigned to the 204th Aviation Brigade.

== Assignments ==
- 11th Aviation Fighter Division (1944-1945)
- 42nd Aviation Assault Division (1945)
- 3rd Aviation Fighter Division (1945-1948)
- 44th Aviation Division (1948–1949)
- Independent Regiment (1949)
- 44th Aviation Division (1949–1959)
- 5th Air Command (1959–1964)
- 5th Aviation Corps (1964–1966)
- 15th Air Defense Division (1966–1986)
- 5th Corps of Air Force and Air Defense (1986–1992)

== Previous designations ==
- 112th Fighter Aviation Regiment (1944-1948)
- 117th Fighter Aviation Regiment (1948-1953)
- 117th Fighter-Bomber Aviation Regiment (1953-1956)
- 117th Fighter Aviation Regiment (1956-1991)

== Organization ==
=== 1961-1968 ===
- 83rd Fighter Aviation Regiment
  - 124th Fighter Aviation Squadron
  - 125th Fighter Aviation Squadron

=== 1968-1991 ===
- 83rd Fighter Aviation Regiment
  - 124th Fighter Aviation Squadron
  - 125th Fighter Aviation Squadron
  - 352nd Reconnaissance Aviation Squadron

== Bases stationed ==
- Veliki Radinci (1944)
- Nadal (1944)
- Klenak (1944)
- Mađaremečke (1944-1945)
- Zagreb Airport, Lučko (1945)
- Zagreb Airport, Pleso (1945)
- Ljubljana (1945)
- Zagreb Airport, Pleso (1945)
- Mostar (1945)
- Novi Sad (1946)
- Ljubljana (1946)
- Mostar (1946-1947)
- Novi Sad (1947)
- Ljubljana (1947)
- Pula (1947–1948)
- Cerklje (1948-1949)
- Zemun (1949-1951)
- Batajnica (1951-1960)
- Zagreb Airport, Pleso (1960–68)
- Željava (1968-1992)

== Commanding officers ==
Date appointed	Name
	Sava Poljanec
	Đuro Ivanišević
	Mile Ćurgus
	Radovan Daković
	Mihajlo Nikolić
	Nikola Lekić
	Milorad Ivanović
	Nikola Milikić
	Nikola Mijatov
	S. Mileusnić
	Vladimir Žanović
	Nikola Maravić
	Ilija Zlatić
	Aleksa Ristić
	Marko Kulić
	Božidar Stefanović
	Zijo Varešanović
	Vladeta Kostić
	Bogdan Mihovilović
	Mahmut Skadrak

== Aircraft ==
- Yakovlev Yak-1M (1944–1948)
- Yakovlev Yak-3 (1945–1948)
- Yakovlev Yak-9/P (1947/1948–1950)
- Ikarus S-49A (1950–1953)
- F-84G Thunderjet (1953–1956)
- F-86E Sabre (1956–1963)
- F-86D Sabre (1963–1968)
- MiG-21F-13 (1967-1971)
- MiG-21PMF (1970–1979)
- MiG-21R (1968–1992)
- MiG-21bis (1978–1992)
- Soko IJ-21 Jastreb (1991–1992)
- Soko IJ-22 Orao (1991–1992)
