= 82nd Aviation Brigade =

82nd Aviation Brigade: 82. avijacijska brigada
- Active: 1945-1991
- Disbanded: 1991
- Country: Yugoslavia
- Branch: Yugoslav Air Force
- Type: Regiment; Brigade
- Part of: 5th Corps of Air Force and Air Defense
- Engagements: Yugoslav wars

The 82nd Aviation Brigade (Serbo-Croatian: 82. avijacijska brigada / 82. авијацијска бригада) was a Yugoslavian aviation regiment established in 1945 as 42nd Bomber Aviation Regiment (Serbo-Croatian: 42. vazduhoplovni bombarderski puk / 42. ваздухопловни бомбардерски пук).

== History ==
=== 42nd Bomber Aviation Regiment ===
The 43rd Bomber Aviation Regiment was formed on August 27, 1945, at Sombor equipped with Soviet made Petlyakov Pe-2 bombers. It was part of 4th Aviation Bomber Division.

By 1948 this regiment was renamed like all other units of Yugoslav Army, so it became the 109th Bomber Aviation Regiment.

The commanders of regiment were Sava Poljanec, Ivo Novak, Berislav Supek, Franjo Jež, and Živko Ranisavljević.

=== 109th Bomber Aviation Regiment ===
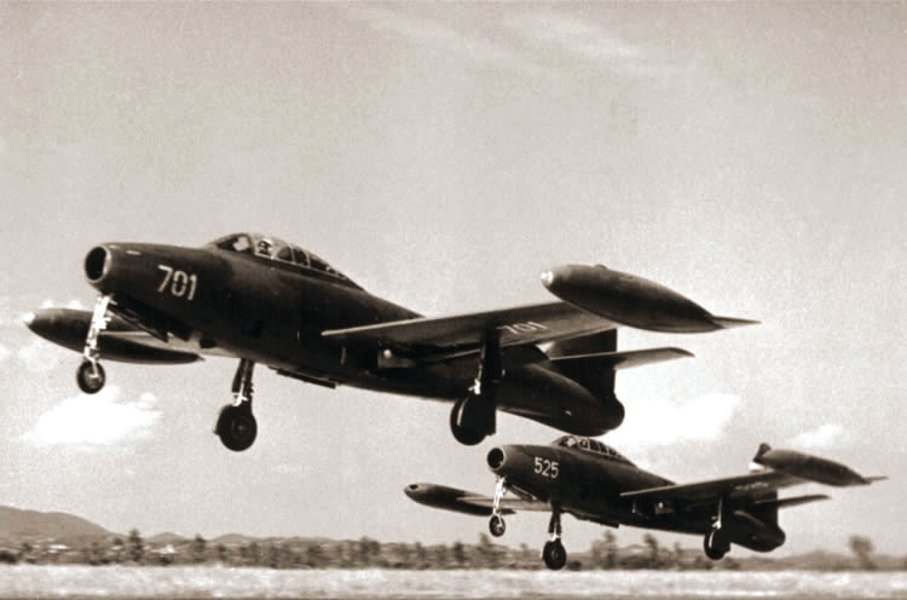
F-84G-31-RE Thunderjet take off in pairs.

The 109th Bomber Aviation Regiment was based at Sombor airfield until 1949, when it was dislocated to Pleso airport. By year 1959 it has moved to Cerklje Air Base. It was armed with Soviet Pe-2 bombers until 1952 when they were replaced with British made Mosquito Mk 6. Mosquitos were replaced with domestic Ikarus S-49C fighters by year 1956. In that period regiment was designated as Fighter Regiment. S-49's were replaced in 1960 by US Republic F-84 Thunderjet fighter-bombers, which remain in service with regiment until 1966.

By the 1961 and application of the "Drvar" reorganization for the Air Force, new type designation system is used to identify squadrons, so the two squadrons of 103rd Reconnaissance Aviation Regiment have become 237th and 238th Fighter-Bomber Aviation Squadron.

On March 15, 1966, regiment was transformed into 82nd Aviation Brigade.

The commanders of regiment were Živko Ranisavljević, Aleksandar Dominko, Nikola Rodić, Gojko Grubor, Slavko Orlić and Vladimir Janković.

=== 82nd Aviation Brigade ===
The Regiment has been reorganized into Brigade by order from February 16, 1966. It has remain at Cerklje Air Base keeping two fighter-bomber squadrons from previous organization, with two new created, 460th Light Combat Aviation Squadron equipped with domestic made Soko 522 and Kraguj aircraft and 352nd Reconnaissance Aviation Squadron at Pleso equipped with US IF-86D Sabre reconnaissance jet fighters. In 1968 352nd Squadron has been dislocated to reattached to 117th Fighter Aviation Regiment, while 460th Squadron has been re-designated as Fighter-Bomber Squadron in August 1973, after it was equipped with new domestic Jastreb light-attack jets. Another two fighter-bomber squadrons have been also armed with Jastrebs.

Two new light combat aviation squadron, 466th and 447th have been formed in June, 1973 with Kraguj aircraft from 460th Squadron. On August 29, same year, 351st Reconnaissance Aviation Squadron equipped with domestic IJ-21 Jastreb reconnaissance attack jets. In 1975 460th Fighter-Bomber Aviation Squadron was renumbered into 245th Fighter-Bomber Aviation Squadron.

In period from 1978 Brigade has been reorganized into Fighter-Bomber Aviation Regiment, 351st, 466th and 467th Squadrons have been subordinated direct to 5th Air Corps. On May 5, 1980 245th Fighter-Bomber Aviation Squadron was dislocated to Mostar and reassignment to Center for training of pilots of foreign armed forces. By 1982 351st Squadron has been again reassignment to 82nd Regiment, which was again renamed in to 82nd Aviation Brigade. New Yugoslav-made ground-attack jet aircraft, Orao have been introduced in Brigade by 1984 with 238th and 351st Squadrons.

The 82nd Brigade took several combat operations in 1991 during the wars in Slovenia and later in the Croatia. As the decomposition of brigade began to along national lines it could no longer used in operations until consolidation. Brigade has retired from Cerklje after mortar attack by Slovenian Territorial Defence on Air Base. It moved to Banja Luka in July 1991, where it was disbanded on August 12. 351st Reconnaissance Aviation Squadron was based at Željava Air Base, attached to 117th Fighter Aviation Regiment and later by order from August 30, 1991, disbanded, with equipment and personnel integrated into 352nd Reconnaissance Aviation Squadron. 237th Fighter-Bomber Aviation Squadron was merged into 238th Fighter-Bomber Aviation Squadron, nicknamed "Risovi Vrbasa" (Vrbas Lynxes), being the main combat aircraft squadron of newly formed Republika Srpska Air Force during the Bosnian war.

The commanders of regiment and brigade were Tomaš Samardžić, Roman Zupan, Božidar Crnojević, Franc Tomažin, Zvonko Kramar, Ivo Martinović, and Jože Jerić.

== Assignments ==
- 4th Aviation Bomber Division (1947-1948)
- 32nd Aviation Division (1948-1959)
- 5th Air Command (1959–1964)
- 5th Aviation Corps (1964–1986)
- 5th Corps of Air Force and Air Defense (1986–1991)

== Previous designations ==
- 42nd Bomber Aviation Regiment (1945-1948)
- 109th Bomber Aviation Regiment (1948-1956)
- 109th Fighter Aviation Regiment (1956-1960)
- 109th Fighter-Bomber Aviation Regiment (1960-1966)
- 82nd Aviation Brigade (1966-1978)
- 82nd Fighter-Bomber Aviation Regiment (1978-1983)
- 82nd Aviation Brigade (1983-1991)

== Organization ==
=== 1961-1966 ===
- 109th Fighter-Bomber Aviation Regiment
  - 237th Fighter-Bomber Aviation Squadron
  - 238th Fighter-Bomber Aviation Squadron
  - 460th Light Combat Aviation Squadron (1965)

=== 1966-1970's ===
- 82nd Aviation Brigade
  - 237th Fighter-Bomber Aviation Squadron
  - 238th Fighter-Bomber Aviation Squadron
  - 460th Light Combat Aviation Squadron (1966-1975)
  - 352nd Reconnaissance Aviation Squadron (1966-1968)

=== 1970's ===
- 82nd Aviation Brigade
  - 237th Fighter-Bomber Aviation Squadron
  - 238th Fighter-Bomber Aviation Squadron
  - 466th Light Combat Aviation Squadron (1973-1978)
  - 467th Light Combat Aviation Squadron (1973-1978)
  - 351st Reconnaissance Aviation Squadron (1973-1978)
  - 245th Fighter-Bomber Aviation Squadron (1975)

=== 1978-1983 ===
- 82nd Fighter-Bomber Aviation Regiment
  - 237th Fighter-Bomber Aviation Squadron
  - 238th Fighter-Bomber Aviation Squadron
  - 245th Fighter-Bomber Aviation Squadron (1979)
  - 351st Reconnaissance Aviation Squadron (1982)

=== 1983-1991 ===
- 82nd Aviation Brigade
  - 238th Fighter-Bomber Aviation Squadron
  - 351st Reconnaissance Aviation Squadron

== Bases stationed ==
- Sombor (1945–1949)
- Pleso (1949-1959)
- Cerklje (1959–1991)
- Banja Luka (1991)

== Commanding officers ==
Date appointed	Name
	Sava Poljanec
	Ivo Novak
	Berislav Supek
	Franjo Jež
	Živko Ranisavljević
	Aleksandar Dominko
	Nikola Rodić
	Gojko Grubor
	Slavko Orlić
	Vladimir Janković
	Tomaš Samardžić
	Roman Zupan
	Božidar Crnojević
	Franc Tomažin
	Zvonko Kramar
	Ivo Martinović
	Jože Jerić

== Equipment ==
- Petlyakov Pe-2 (1947–1952)
- de Havilland Mosquito Mk 6 (1952–1956)
- Ikarus S-49C (1956-1960)
- F-84G Thunderjet (1960-1973)
- Lockheed T-33A Shooting Star (1966–1973)
- IF-86D Sabre (1966–1967)
- Soko 522 (1966–1967)
- Soko J-20 Kraguj (1967–1978)
- Soko J-21 Jastreb (1972–1991)
- Soko G-2 Galeb (1972–1991)
- Soko J-22 Orao (1984–1991)
