= Cerklje =

Cerklje may refer to places in Slovenia:

- Cerklje na Gorenjskem, town and seat of
  - Municipality of Cerklje na Gorenjskem
- Cerklje ob Krki and nearby
  - Cerklje ob Krki Barracks
  - Cerklje ob Krki Airport
