= Slovenian Air Force (disambiguation) =

The Slovenian Air Force has gone under different names in different periods:

- 15th Aviation Brigade of the Territorial Defense Force, from 1992 to 1995
- 15th Aviation Brigade of the Slovenian Army, from 1995 to 2008
- Brigade of air defense and aviation of the Slovenian Army, from 2008 to present
