= Rogožarski IK-3 =

1930s Yugoslav low-wing, monoplane, single-seat fighter

IK-3
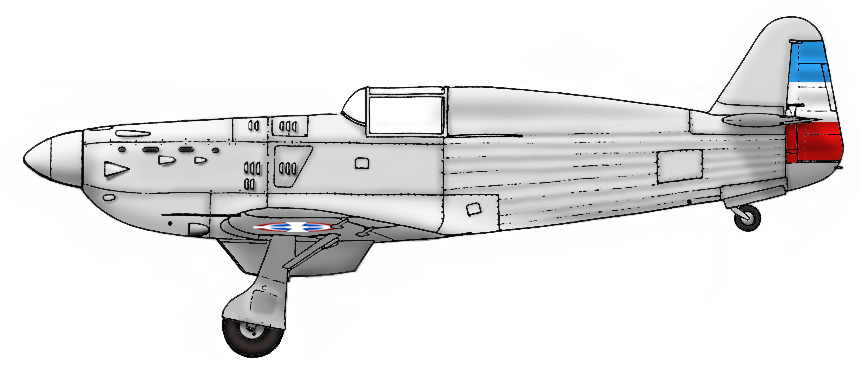
- Rogožarski IK-3

General information
- Type: Fighter
- Manufacturer: Rogožarski A.D
- Designer: Kosta Sivčev, Ljubomir Ilić, Slobodan Zrnić
- Primary user: Royal Yugoslav Air Force
- Number built: 13

History
- Introduction date: late March 1939
- First flight: late May 1938
- Retired: June 1941
- Developed into: Ikarus S-49

The Rogožarski IK-3 was a 1930s Yugoslav monoplane single-seat fighter, designed by Ljubomir Ilić, Kosta Sivčev and Slobodan Zrnić as a successor to the Ikarus IK-2 fighter. Its armament consisted of a hub-firing 20 mm (0.79 in) autocannon and two fuselage-mounted synchronised machine guns. It was considered comparable to foreign aircraft such as the Messerschmitt Bf 109E and came into service in 1940. The prototype crashed during testing; twelve production aircraft had been delivered by July 1940.

Six IK-3s were serviceable when the Axis invasion of Yugoslavia began on 6 April 1941. All six were in service with the 51st Independent Fighter Group at Zemun near Belgrade. Pilots flying the IK-3 claimed 11 Axis aircraft had been shot down during the 11-day war. According to one account, to prevent them from falling into German hands, the surviving aircraft and incomplete airframes were destroyed by their crews and factory staff. Another account suggests that one aircraft survived the invasion and was later destroyed by sabotage. The IK-3 design was the basis for the post-war Yugoslav-built Ikarus S-49 fighter.

== Background ==
In the late 1920s, the Royal Yugoslav Air Force (Serbian: Vazduhoplovstvo vojske Kraljevine Jugoslavije, VVKJ) and the Royal Aero Club of Yugoslavia helped send aspiring aeronautical engineers to France to gain knowledge. It was intended that after this advanced training, they would return to Yugoslavia and be offered specialist roles in the VVKJ or in the aeronautical industry. Ljubomir Ilić and Kosta Sivčev went through this program but, when they returned to Yugoslavia, both were employed in administrative work. Frustrated by this, they decided in 1931 to design a replacement for the Czechoslovak-built Avia BH-33E biplane fighter in service with the VVKJ. Working in a basement in Belgrade, and later in Ilić's apartment in Novi Sad, they secretly devoted their spare time to work on their design. They originally planned a low-wing monoplane with retractable landing gear. Contemporary thinking within the VVKJ led them to evolve their initial ideas into a strut-braced gull-wing monoplane armed with a hub-firing autocannon and fuselage-mounted synchronised machine guns. The design concept for what became the Ikarus IK-2 was submitted to the VVKJ on 22 September 1933. With this work completed, Ilić and Sivčev had time to start preliminary development of a new low-wing monoplane that could better meet and defeat the high-performance bomber prototypes then in development by potential adversaries.

== Design and development ==
Ilić and Sivčev's new streamlined low-wing monoplane design had a retractable undercarriage. Like the IK-2 it was initially developed privately by the two men. A scale model was tested in the Eiffel-built wind tunnel in Paris, but the pair soon realised that they needed a third engineer to help evaluate the design and determine the structural details. Slobodan Zrnić, the head of construction at the Yugoslav State Aircraft Factory in Kraljevo, was recruited, as he had worked as a specialist aircraft engineer in France. The project name for the IK-2 was changed from IK, standing for (Ljubomir) Ilić and Kosta (Sivčev), to IKZ, to include Zrnić. This name was changed, possibly due to the similarities between the Cyrillic "З" (Z) and the Arabic numeral "3", and the aircraft became known as the IK-3. The aircraft was to be powered by a Hispano-Suiza 12Y29 engine, generating 980 hp (730 kW) at an altitude of 5,000 m (16,000 ft). The designers favoured manoeuvrability over speed, trying to find a compromise between the German and British concepts of a modern monoplane fighter. The design had a smaller wing area than the Hawker Hurricane and the Supermarine Spitfire, to achieve a higher speed for the engine power. In comparison to the Messerschmitt Bf 109, the Yugoslav design had a shorter fuselage and smaller turning radius. It differed from British and German design concepts in that its proposed armament was concentrated in the fuselage.

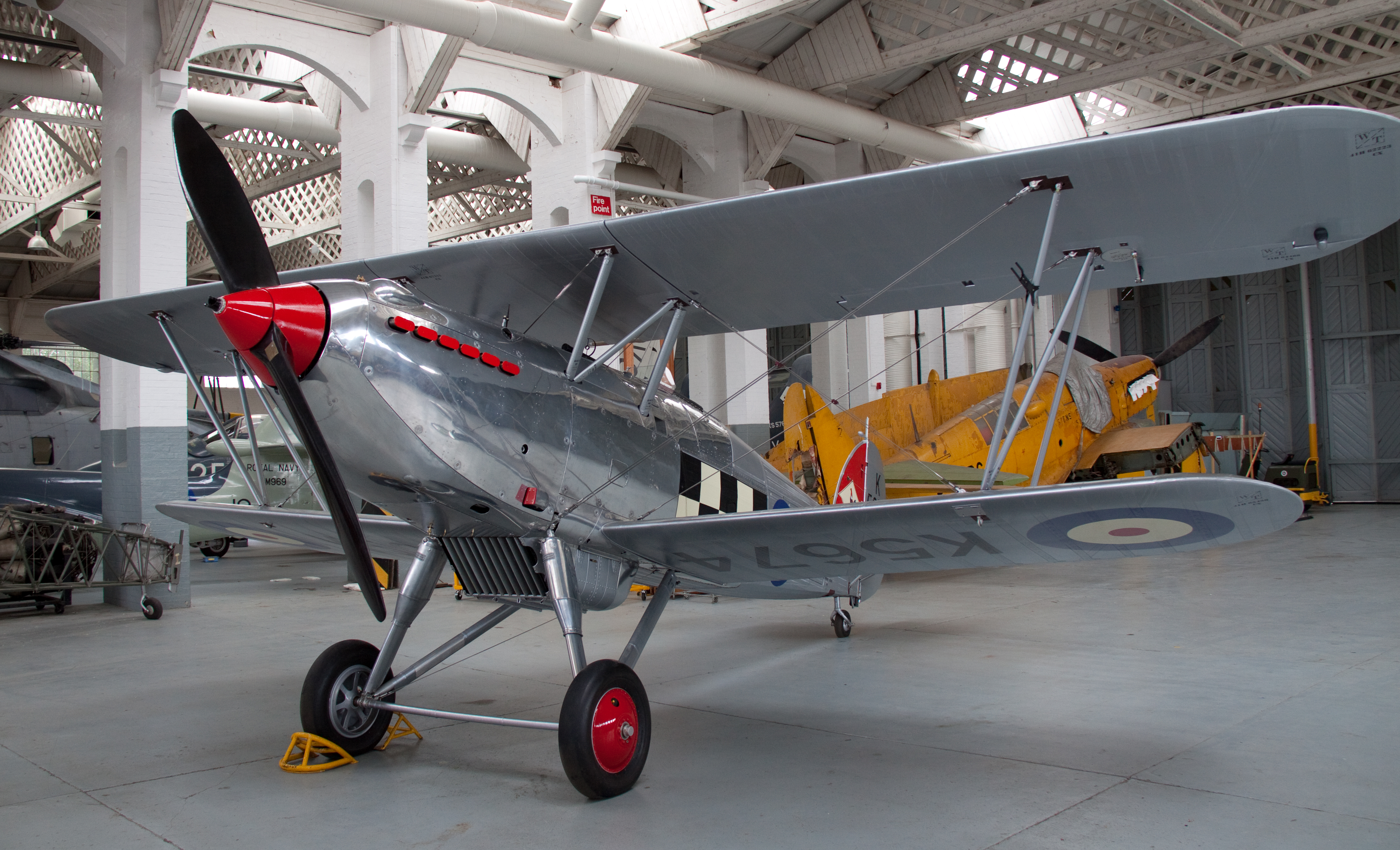
The performance of the Hawker Fury was compared against the IK-3. The Fury was already in service with the VVKJ.

The designs were delivered to the VVKJ in time for approval by mid-1936, but a general reluctance to adopt new concepts delayed the IK-3, and a contract for the production of the prototype was not signed until March 1937. The company selected for construction was Rogožarski A.D. in Belgrade. The first flight of the prototype was carried out by the VVKJ Test Group towards the end of May 1938 and the aircraft was then flown by a group of VVKJ officers who were to determine the best employment for it within the VVKJ, along with tactics to be used in Yugoslav conditions. These pilots observed that the controls were highly sensitive; the only real criticisms related to the visual distortion caused by the curved panels of the canopy. Some pilots believed that the fuselage-mounted armament should be supplemented by two wing-mounted machine guns. The test pilots also had to compare the performance of the IK-3 with the Hawker Fury (a biplane), Heinkel He 112, Morane-Saulnier M.S. 405 and Hawker Hurricane. They concluded that the IK-3 most closely matched the Morane-Saulnier; the Yugoslav aircraft was 40 km/h (25 mph) faster. In November 1938, the VVKJ placed an order with Rogožarski for 12 aircraft.

On 19 January 1939, test pilot Kapetan Milan Pokorni put the prototype into a steep dive. When he reached 400 m (1,300 ft), the windscreen detached from the aircraft; Pokorni pulled up hard and the strain broke off half of the starboard wing. The aircraft crashed, and Pokorni was killed. An inquiry determined that modifications to the windscreen had contributed to the accident. Engineers recalculated the stress factors on the airframe and they were found to be safe, and the main factor had been the pilot's handling of the highly sensitive controls.

The loss of the prototype and some changes in the construction of the production model delayed the fulfilment of the contract. Further tests were conducted on the wing and it was found to withstand a g-force of 14. Modifications were made for the production model, including the use of flat plexiglass panels in the windscreen and the canopy to provide better visibility. The instrument layout was improved and the upper rear fuselage behind the pilot's seat was re-shaped. The folding undercarriage leg covers were replaced by single plates. The main changes were the replacement of the engine with a modified version of the Hispano-Suiza 12Y engine made under licence by the Czechoslovak company Avia and the replacement of the Hispano-Suiza HS.404 cannon by a Swiss-made Oerlikon FF 20 mm cannon. The replacement engine was less powerful, generating 860 hp (640 kW) at 4,000 m (13,000 ft). German-made Telefunken radios were to be installed but delays meant that only the first aircraft was delivered with a radio. The production aircraft were numbered 2–13; the prototype was number 1. The aircraft were built at the Rogožarski factory in Belgrade and assembled at the company hangar at Zemun. The first six aircraft were delivered by late March 1940; delivery of the rest of the order was delayed until July due to delays by foreign suppliers. The first production aircraft was delivered to the VVKJ Test Group, where it was confirmed that the production aircraft were free of the faults in the prototype. The Test Group determined that the maximum speed, previously estimated at 540 km/h (340 mph), was 527 km/h (327 mph), at an altitude of 5,400 m (17,700 ft). By July 1940, a further series of 25 IK-3s had commenced construction at the Rogožarski factory.

=== Planned developments ===
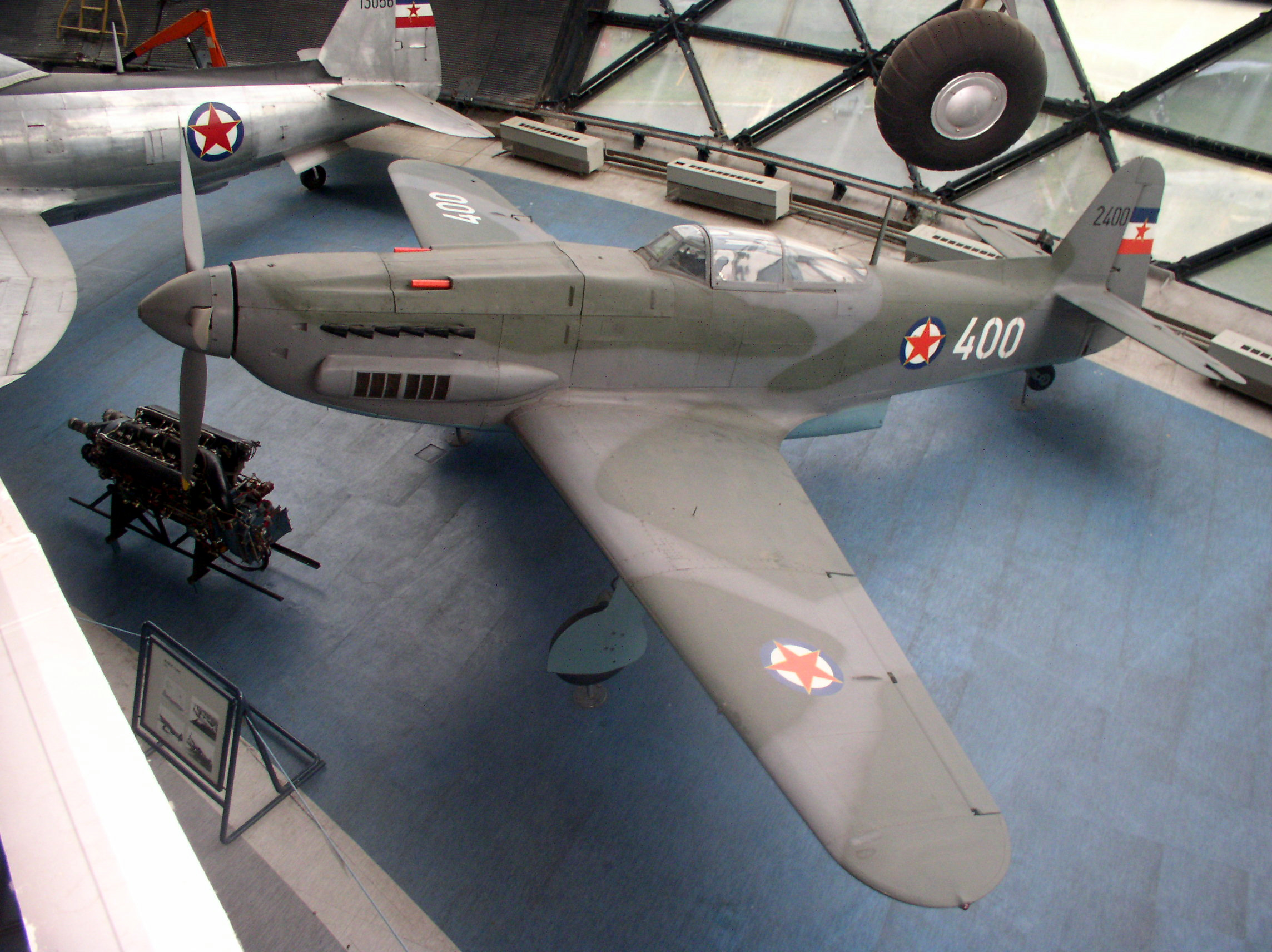
The post-war Ikarus S-49 fighter was based on the IK-3

A shortage of engines was a major obstacle to mass production and development of the IK-3, so tests were conducted with more powerful engines, including the Daimler-Benz DB 601, Rolls-Royce Merlin II and Hispano-Suiza 12Y51. The tests were incomplete at the time of the Axis invasion, and the only prototype to be fitted with a non-production engine was deliberately destroyed by factory personnel during the invasion, along with the incomplete production aircraft. Development of a dual-control two-seat trainer variant of the IK-3 had commenced but pressure on the design team had delayed the completion of the project when the invasion intervened.

The development of the IK-3 encouraged the three designers to pursue the idea of a twin-engined fighter, capable of long-range reconnaissance, photographic reconnaissance and operation as a "destroyer" or heavy fighter similar to the Messerschmitt Bf 110. The concept included both one-seater and two-seater versions. Development of this new aircraft, designated IK-5, was commenced on the back of the success of the IK-3. The VVKJ ordered a one-seater prototype in early July 1939, with its first flight scheduled for late 1941. At the time of the invasion, the production of the IK-5 prototype was well advanced, but it was not pursued either during or after the war. The advanced Yugoslav Ikarus S-49 fighter, produced after World War II, was based on the IK-3.

== Operational history ==
When they entered service, the IK-3 suffered from minor equipment and instrument faults, largely caused by deficiencies in the Yugoslav aeronautical industry which had resulted in a mixture of foreign and Yugoslav-made instruments being fitted to the aircraft. The Yugoslav Minister of War approved the acquisition of a further 48 IK-3s to be delivered in 1941–1942. The operational aircraft were allocated to the 51st Independent Fighter Group at Zemun, six each to the 161st Fighter Squadron (Kapetan Savo Poljanec) and the 162nd Fighter Squadron (Kapetan Todor Gogić). The IK-3 was then tested against Yugoslav Messerschmitt Bf 109Es in mock dogfights. The evaluation concluded that the IK-3 had several advantages over the Bf 109E; in particular, the Yugoslav aircraft was more manoeuvrable in level flight, enabling it to quickly get behind a pursuing Bf 109E by making tight horizontal turns.

In its first year of service, an IK-3 was lost when one of the squadron commanders, Kapetan Anton Ercigoj, was making a mock attack on a Potez 25 over the confluence of the Sava and Danube rivers. After passing below the Potez, he went into a climb with the intention of performing a loop. His rate of climb was too steep and the aircraft fell into a spin at low altitude and hit the water. Before the Axis invasion of Yugoslavia in early April 1941, the 51st Fighter Group was placed under the 6th Fighter Regiment, which was responsible for the defence of Belgrade. The 51st Fighter Group was further reinforced the day before the invasion began, with the 102nd Fighter Squadron equipped with Bf 109Es. When the invasion began on 6 April, the two IK-3 squadrons had only three serviceable aircraft each.

The invasion commenced with a wave of 234 German dive bombers and medium bombers attacking Belgrade. Escorted by 120 fighters, the bombers reached Belgrade at 07:00; they were met by the 51st Fighter Group, minus an IK-3 from the 161st Fighter Squadron that had developed engine trouble after takeoff and was unable to engage. The other five IK-3s were the first to meet the initial bomber wave but they were almost immediately attacked by Bf 109Es of Jagdgeschwader 77. The pilots of the IK-3s claimed five German aircraft, and one aircraft from each Yugoslav squadron was lost. Poljanec had claimed a twin-engined bomber and a Bf 109E; when he returned to Zemun in his badly damaged aircraft, he was strafed by a Messerschmitt Bf 110, which further damaged his aircraft and wounded him. After this encounter, only three IK-3s were serviceable, including the one that had developed engine difficulties prior to the first German wave.

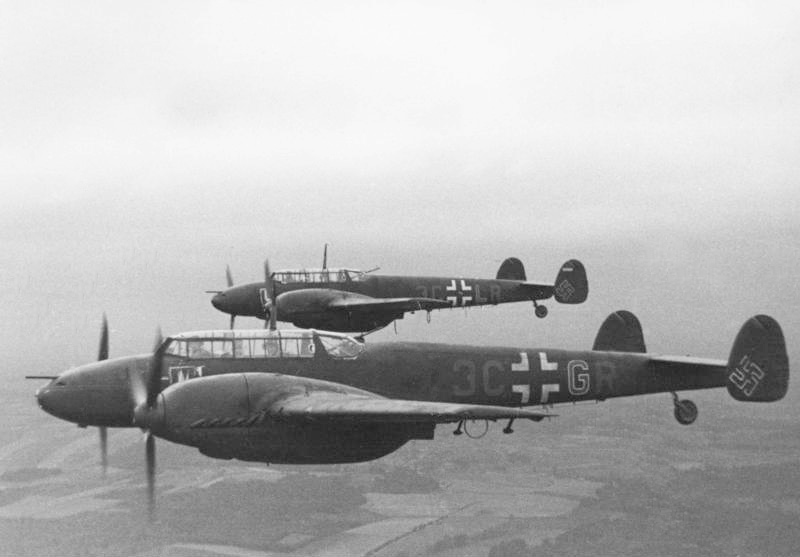
The most successful IK-3 pilot, Milislav Semiz, shot down a Messerschmitt Bf 110 on 11 April, one of his four victories.

A second wave of German aircraft arrived over Belgrade at 10:00 and the remaining IK-3s were scrambled with the rest of the 51st Fighter Group but the IK-3 pilots claimed no victories. A joint claim was made during the third German attack at 14:00, a twin-engined bomber by Gogić and another pilot from the 162nd Fighter Squadron. The following day, the IK-3 pilots made five or six sorties against German bomber formations and their fighter escorts, and claimed three bombers between them. At 17:00, Milislav Semiz attacked a tight formation of three bombers; his aircraft received 56 hits from return fire, 20 of which were in the engine and propeller, but he managed to land the aircraft. The return of another IK-3 from the workshops meant that the number of serviceable IK-3s remained at three.

It became difficult to continue activity from the 51st Fighter Group airfield at Zemun due to air attacks, so on 8 April the remaining IK-3s and Bf 109Es flew to an auxiliary airfield at Veliki Radinci, 50 km (31 mi) north-west of Belgrade, where the surviving aircraft of the 6th Fighter Regiment were concentrated. Poor weather made operations impossible until 11 April, when Semiz shot down a Bf 110 that had strafed the airfield. Later that day, Gogić and another IK-3 pilot claimed one Junkers Ju 87 'Stuka' dive bomber each during a patrol. That night, German troops approached within 15 km (9.3 mi) of the airfield at Veliki Radinci and the following day all remaining aircraft of the 6th Fighter Regiment, including the remaining IK-3s, were burned by their crews. According to aviation writers Dragan Savić and Boris Ciglić, one serviceable IK-3 was captured by the Germans in April 1941 and it was joined by another by the end of June. Both aircraft were located at Zemun, along with 23 other former VVKJ aircraft in working condition that were destined for service with the air force of the Axis puppet state, the Independent State of Croatia. The Germans had used a fence to separate the serviceable aircraft from other aircraft that had been earmarked for scrapping. In late June, while the German guards were distracted listening to news of the invasion of the Soviet Union, local communists, including former VVKJ mechanics, moved the fence. As a result, all the serviceable aircraft were scrapped, including the two IK-3s.

"The IK-3s put up a valiant resistance against the Luftwaffe," wrote William Green, "scoring a number of 'kills' before they were finally destroyed in combat." Aviation writers Šime Oštrić and Čedomir Janić credit the IK-3 pilots with 11 victories, Semiz being the most successful, with four victories.

== Operators ==
Kingdom of Yugoslavia

- Royal Yugoslav Air Force

== Specifications ==
Rogožarski IK-3 three view

Data from Oštrić & Janić

General characteristics

- Crew: 1
- Length: 8 m (26 ft 3 in)
- Wingspan: 10.3 m (33 ft 10 in)
- Height: 3.25 m (10 ft 8 in)
- Wing area: 16.5 m^{2} (178 sq ft)
- Empty weight: 2,048 kg (4,515 lb)
- Gross weight: 2,630 kg (5,798 lb)
- Fuel capacity: 330 L (73 imp gal; 87 US gal)
- Powerplant: 1 × Avia-built Hispano-Suiza 12Ycrs liquid-cooled V-12 piston engine, 730 kW (980 hp) at 5,000 m (16,000 ft))
- Propellers: 3-bladed adjustable pitch

Performance

- Maximum speed: 527 km/h (327 mph, 285 kn)
- Cruise speed: 400 km/h (250 mph, 220 kn)
- Range: 785 km (488 mi, 424 nmi)
- Service ceiling: 9,400 m (30,800 ft)
- Time to altitude: 7 minutes to 5,000 m (16,000 ft)
- Wing loading: 159.4 kg/m^{2} (32.6 lb/sq ft)

Armament

- 1 × Oerlikon FF 20 mm cannon
- 2 × 7.92 mm caliber Browning/FN machine guns with 500 rounds per gun

== See also ==
Related development

- Ikarus S-49

Aircraft of comparable role, configuration, and era

- Curtiss P-40
- Dewoitine D.520
- Hawker Hurricane
- Heinkel He 112
- Messerschmitt Bf 109
- Morane-Saulnier M.S.405
- Supermarine Spitfire

Related lists

- List of aircraft of World War II
