= 1st Air Command =

1st Air Command may refer to:

- 1st Air Command (Sweden), an air group unit in the Swedish Air Force 1938–1948
- 1st Air Command (Yugoslavia), a joint unit of the Yugoslav Air Force 1959–1964
