= 351st Reconnaissance Aviation Squadron =

351st Reconnaissance Aviation Squadron: 351. izviđačka avijacijska eskadrila
- Active: 1961 – 1966; 1973 - 1991
- Disbanded: 1966; 1991
- Country: Yugoslavia
- Branch: Yugoslav Air Force
- Type: Squadron
- Role: Reconnaissance
- Part of: 82nd Aviation Brigade
- Garrison/HQ: Tuzla Air Base
- Engagements: Yugoslav wars

The 351st Reconnaissance Aviation Squadron (Serbo-Croatian: 351. izviđačka avijacijska eskadrila / 351. извиђачка авијацијска ескадрила) was an aviation squadron of Yugoslav Air Force established in April 1961 at Tuzla military air base.

== History ==
Squadron was formed as part of 103rd Reconnaissance Aviation Regiment equipped with US-made Lockheed RT/IT-33A Shooting Star jet-trainer aircraft equipped for aerial reconnaissance. In 1966 squadron was disbanded and its equipment and personnel were passed to 350th Reconnaissance Aviation Squadron of same regiment.

By order from August 29, 1973, 351st Reconnaissance Aviation Squadron was reestablished with 82nd Aviation Brigade at Cerklje airport. It was equipped with new domestic-made Soko Jastreb light-attack jet aircraft in IJ-21 reconnaissance version. In 1984 the first Orao attack aircraft in the IJ-22 reconnaissance version were introduced with this squadron. This was the first squadron of Yugoslav Air Force equipped with new Orao aircraft. In 1985 all Jastreb aircraft were replaced with Orao.

The squadron took part in first combat operations during the war in Slovenia and Croatia later since beginning of Yugoslav wars in 1991.

351st Reconnaissance Aviation Squadron was evacuated from Slovenia to Željava Air Base, attached to 117th Fighter Aviation Regiment and later by order from August 30, 1991, disbanded, with equipment and personnel integrated into 352nd Reconnaissance Aviation Squadron.

== Assignments ==
- 103rd Reconnaissance Aviation Regiment (1961−1966)
- 82nd Aviation Brigade/82nd Fighter-Bomber Aviation Regiment (1973−1978)
- 5th Aviation Corps (1978−1982)
- 82nd Aviation Brigade/82nd Fighter-Bomber Aviation Regiment (1982−1991)

== Bases stationed ==
- Tuzla Air Base (1961−1966)
- Cerklje (1973−1991)
- Željava Air Base

== Equipment ==
- Lockheed RT/IT-33A Shooting Star (1961–1966)
- Soko IJ-21 Jastreb (1973–1985)
- Soko IJ-22 Orao (1984–1991)
