= 44th Aviation Division =

44th Aviation Division: 44. vazduhoplovna divizija
- Active: 1945–1959
- Disbanded: 1959
- Country: Yugoslavia
- Branch: Yugoslav Air Force
- Type: Division
- Size: 2-3 regiments
- HQ: Batajnica Air Base

The 44th Aviation Division (Serbo-Croatian: 44. vazduhoplovna divizija/ 44. ваздухопловна дивизија) was a unit originally established in 1945 as the 3rd Aviation Fighter Division (Serbo-Croatian: 3. vazduhoplovna lovačka divizija / 3. ваздухопловна ловачка дивизија).

== History ==
=== 3rd Fighter Aviation Division ===
The 3rd Fighter Aviation Division was established by order from August 3, 1945, with headquarters at Mostar. The division was direct under the Command of Yugoslav Air Force. It consisted from 254th Fighter and 112th Fighter Aviation Regiment.

Because of the crisis at Northwest of county, division has been dislocated to Novi Sad by Spring of 1946, and to Ljubljana by Summer-Autumn same year. On 9 August 1946 a pair of Yak-3 aircraft from 254th Regiment piloted by the Lieutenant Dragan Zečević and Warrant Officer Dragan Stanisavljević have open fire and hit USAF C-47 which has violated Yugoslav airspace flow over Ljubljana airport at 12 p.m. which has forced landing 12 km near Kranj. One passenger, Turkish captain was wounded by hit, while crew and passengers were captured by Yugoslav Army. Later it was released by August 22, and the tension made with this incident and another one shooting down of USAF C-47 with fatal consequences for whole crew of five airmen was reduced after Marshal Tito ordered to pay $150.000 to families of killed US airmen. By winter, division with its regiments has moved to Mostar and then again in 1947 across Novi Sad to Ljubljana and Cerklje where it stayed during late 1947 and 1948.

By the 1948 year this division was renamed like all other units of Yugoslav Army, so it has become 44th Fighter Aviation Division (Serbo-Croatian: 44. vazduhoplovna lovačka divizija/ 44. ваздухопловна ловачка дивизија).

The commanders of division in this period were Petar Radević and Hinko Šoić. Commissars were Milutin Omazić and Svetozar Radojević.

=== 44th Aviation Division ===
The 44th Fighter Aviation Division was formed by renaming of 3rd Fighter Aviation Division in 1948. It suffered a changes in the organization. Division has moved from Cerklje in 1949 to Zemun and finally to new build Batajnica Air Base in 1951 where it has stayed until it was disbanded.

In 1953 division was attached to 7th Aviation Corps. It has relocated its headquarters from Zagreb to Cerklje. By 1953 it was renamed in to Aviation Fighter-Bomber Division due to the replacement of Soviet fighter aircraft with US-made fighter-bombers.

It was disbanded by the order from June 27, 1959, year per the "Drvar" reorganization plan. It was transformed into 1st Air Command.

The commanders of division in this period were Hinko Šoić, Mihajlo Nikolić and Nikola Lekić. Commissars were Svetozar Radojević and Alojz Tencer until 1953.

== Assignments ==
- Command of Yugoslav Air Force (1945-1953)
- 7th Aviation Corps (1949–1959)

== Previous designations ==
- 3rd Aviation Fighter Division (1945-1948)
- 44th Aviation Fighter Division (1948-1953)
- 44th Aviation Fighter-Bomber Division (1953-1959)

== Organization ==
=== 1945-1948 ===
- 3rd Aviation Mixed Division
  - 254th Fighter Aviation Regiment
  - 112th Fighter Aviation Regiment

=== 1948-1959 ===
- 44th Aviation Fighter/Fighter-Bomber Division
    - Training Squadron of 44th Aviation Division (1953-1954, 1956–1959)
  - 103rd Reconnaissance Aviation Regiment (1952-1953)
  - 117th Fighter Aviation Regiment
  - 172nd Assault Aviation Regiment (1949)
  - 204th Fighter Aviation Regiment (1950-1959)
  - 177th Air Base (1953-1959)
  - 191st Air Base (1953-1959)
  - 399th Air Base (1953-1956)

== Headquarters ==
- Mostar (1945-1946)
- Novi Sad (1946)
- Ljubljana (1946)
- Mostar (1946-1947)
- Ljubljana (1947)
- Cerklje (1947-1949)
- Zemun (1949-1951)
- Batajnica (1951-1959)

== Commanding officers ==
- Lieutenant-Colonel Petar Radević
- Lieutenant-Colonel Hinko Šoić
- Colonel Mihajlo Nikolić
- Colonel Nikola Lekić

=== Political commissars ===
- Lieutenant-Colonel Milutin Omazić
- Lieutenant-Colonel Svetozar Radojević
- Colonel Alojz Tencer
