= 184th Reconnaissance Aviation Regiment =

184th Reconnaissance Aviation Regiment: 184. izviđački avijacijski puk
- Active: 1948–1966
- Disbanded: 1. 1952; 2. 1966
- Country: Yugoslavia
- Branch: Yugoslav Air Force
- Size: 2 × aviation squadrons
- Part of: 3rd Air Corps

The 184th Reconnaissance Aviation Regiment (Serbo-Croatian Latin: 184. izviđački avijacijski puk, 184. извиђачки авијацијски пук) was an aviation regiment established in 1948 as the Night Bomber Aviation Regiment (Serbo-Croatian Latin: Vazduhoplovni noćni bombarderski puk, Ваздухопловни ноћни бомбардерски пук), then the 184th Light Night Bomber Aviation Regiment, before adopting its final name from 1952 until its disestablishment in 1966. It was equipped with a number of reconnaissance aircraft, from the Soviet-made Polikarpov Po-2 to the North American F-86D Sabre.

== History ==
=== Night Bomber Aviation Regiment and 184th Light Night Bomber Aviation Regiment ===
The Night Bomber Aviation Regiment was formed in May 1948 at Polje Airport, Ljubljana in the People's Republic of Slovenia of Yugoslavia. A few months later it was renamed using a pattern adopted for all units of the Yugoslav Air Force, becoming the 184th Light Night Bomber Aviation Regiment.

The regiment was initially equipped with Soviet-made Polikarpov Po-2 biplanes, and was part of the 32nd Aviation Division. In 1949, it has relocated from Ljubljana to Banja Luka airfield, where it remained for a year. The regiment again relocated to the Borongaj airfield near Zagreb, and in 1951 it moved to its final base at Pleso airport, also near Zagreb. The regiment was disbanded in January 1952, when it joined with the 715th Independent Reconnaissance Squadron to form the 184th Reconnaissance Aviation Regiment. Throughout its existence, the commander of regiment was Branko Glumac.

=== 184th Reconnaissance Aviation Regiment ===
The newly established regiment remained at Pleso until it was disbanded. It was armed with British-made de Havilland Mosquito aircraft until 1960, when they were replaced with US made Republic F-84 Thunderjet reconnaissance jet-aircraft. The Thunderjet aircraft were subsequently replaced with North American F-86D Sabre aircraft in 1963.

In 1961, the application of the "Drvar" reorganisation of the Yugoslav Air Force called for a new designation system to identify squadrons, so the two squadrons of the 184th Reconnaissance Aviation Regiment became the 352nd and 353rd Reconnaissance Aviation Squadrons.

The regiment was disbanded in 1966 at Pleso. The 353rd Reconnaissance Aviation Squadron was disbanded, while the 352nd Reconnaissance Aviation Squadron was transferred to the 82nd Aviation Brigade.

The commanders of regiment were Spasen Zarevski, Petrović Nikola, Lazar Savićević, Milan Crnomarković and Mitar Mitrović.

== Assignments ==
- 32nd Aviation Division (1948–1953)
- 3rd Aviation Corps (1953–1959)
- 5th Air Command (1959–1964)
- 5th Aviation Corps (1964–1966)

== Previous designations ==
- Night Bomber Aviation Regiment (1948)
- 184th Light Night Bomber Aviation Regiment (1948–1952)
- 184th Reconnaissance Aviation Regiment (1952–1966)

== Organization ==
=== 1961–1964 ===
- 184th Reconnaissance Aviation Regiment
  - 352nd Reconnaissance Aviation Squadron
  - 353rd Reconnaissance Aviation Squadron

== Bases stationed ==
- Ljubljana (1947–1949)
- Banja Luka (1949–1950)
- Borongaj (1950–1951)
- Pleso (1951–1966)

== Commanding officers ==
Date appointed	Name
1947 –1952	Branko Glumac
	Spasen Zarevski
	Petrović Nikola
	Lazar Savićević
	Milan Crnomarković
	Mitar Mitrović

== Aircraft ==
- Polikarpov Po-2 (1948–1952)
- de Havilland Mosquito NF Mk 38 (1952–1960)
- RF-84G Thunderjet (1961–1963)
- IF-86D Sabre (1963–1966)
