= 467th Light Combat Aviation Squadron =

467th Light Combat Aviation Squadron: 467. eskadrila lake borbene avijacije
- Active: 1973 – 1984
- Disbanded: 1984
- Country: Yugoslavia
- Branch: Yugoslav Air Force
- Type: Squadron
- Role: Training; Light Combat
- Part of: 5th Aviation Corps

The 467th Light Combat Aviation Squadron (Serbo-Croatian: 467. eskadrila lake borbene avijacije / 467. ескадрила лаке борбене авијације) was an aviation squadron of Yugoslav Air Force formed by order from March 7, 1978, at Cerklje military air base as part of 82nd Aviation Brigade.

The squadron was formed with 467th Light Combat Aviation Squadron from 460th Light Combat Aviation Squadron equipment, domestic-made Soko J-20 Kraguj counter-insurgency aircraft. By order from November 1976, in 1978 the squadron has been dislocated to Brnik airfield and it was reattached to 5th Aviation Corps as an independent squadron.

Squadeon was disbanded by order from April 15, 1982.

== Assignments ==
- 82nd Aviation Brigade (1973-1978)
- 5th Aviation Corps (1978-1984)

== Bases stationed ==
- Cerklje (1973–1978)
- Brnik (1978-1984)

== Equipment ==
- Soko J-20 Kraguj (1973–1984)
