= 15th Air Defense Division =

15th Air Defense Division: 15. divizija protivvazdušne odbrane
- Active: 1964–1986
- Disbanded: 1986
- Country: Yugoslavia
- Branch: Yugoslav Air Force
- Type: Division
- Size: 5 regiments
- HQ: Zagreb

The 15th Air Defense Division (Serbo-Croatian: 15. divizija protivvazdušne odbrane/ 15. дивизија противваздушне одбране) was an air defense division established in 1964
5th Air Defense Zone (Serbo-Croatian: 5. zona protivvazdušne odbrane / 5. зона противваздушне одбране).

== History ==
The 5th Air Defense Zone was formed in 1964, and it was reorganized into 15th Air Defense Division on July 25, 1966. The divisions command was first at Pleso, and by order from June 13, 1969, it has been moved to Zagreb. Its task was aerial defense of western part of the airspace of Yugoslavia. It has consisted from four regiments, one fighter aviation regiment, two rocket air defense regiments and one air reconnaissance regiment, and other smaller units. It was disbanded on February 28, 1986, when its command was reorganized into command of 5th Corps of Air Force and Air Defense.

== Assignments ==
- Command of Yugoslav Air Force (1964-1978)
- 5th Aviation Corps (1978–1986)

== Previous designations ==
- 5th Air Defense Zone (1964-1966)
- 15th Air Defense Division (1966-1986)

== Organization ==
- 117th Fighter Aviation Regiment
- 155th Air Defense Missile Regiment
- 350th Air Defense Missile Regiment
- 5th Air Reconnaissance Regiment
- 220th Signal Battalion

== Commanding officers ==
Date appointed	Name
	Đuro Prilika
	Aleksandar Bračuna
	Anton Tus
	Nikola Benić
	Nikola Maravić
	Živan Mirčetić
