= Liaison Squadron of 1st Air Command =

Liaison Squadron of 1st Air Command Eskadrila za vezu 1. vazduhoplovne komande
- Active: 1952 – after 1959
- Disbanded: after 1959
- Country: Yugoslavia
- Branch: Yugoslav Air Force
- Type: Squadron
- Role: Liaison
- Part of: 1st Air Command
- Garrison/HQ: Pančevo

The Liaison Squadron of 1st Air Command (Serbo-Croatian: Eskadrila za vezu 1. vazduhoplovne komande / Ескадрила за везу 1. ваздухопловне команде) was an aviation squadron of Yugoslav Air Force formed in 1952 at Pančevo airfield as Liaison Squadron of 1st Military district (Serbo-Croatian: Eskadrila za vezu 1. vojne oblasti / Ескадрила за везу 1. војне области).

Squadron was formed by order from December 17, 1951, on February 1, 1952, as part of 1st Military district . It was equipped with various training and liaison aircraft. Squadron was transformed into Liaison Squadron of 1st Air Command by 1959. It was disbanded after 1959, estimated 1961.

== Assignments ==
- 1st Military district (1952–1959)
- 1st Air Command (1959-1961 ?)

== Previous designations ==
- Liaison Squadron of 1st Air Command (1952–1959)
- Liaison Squadron of 1st Air Command (1959-1961 ?)

== Equipment ==
- Polikarpov Po-2 (1952-1959)
- Avro Anson MkXI (1952-1959)
- Kaproni Bulgarski KB-11 Fazan (1952-1959)
- Ikarus Kurir (1959-1961 ?)
