= 236th Fighter-Bomber Aviation Squadron =

236th Fighter-Bomber Aviation Squadron: 236. lovačko-bombarderska avijacijska eskadrila
- Active: 1961 – 1964
- Disbanded: 1964
- Country: Yugoslavia
- Branch: Yugoslav Air Force
- Type: Squadron
- Role: Fighter-Bomber
- Part of: 88th Fighter-Bomber Aviation Regiment
- Garrison/HQ: Batajnica Air Base

The 236th Fighter-Bomber Aviation Squadron (Serbo-Croatian: 236. lovačko-bombarderska avijacijska eskadrila / 236. ловачко-бомбардерска авијацијска ескадрила) was an aviation squadron of Yugoslav Air Force established in April 1961 as part of 88th Fighter-Bomber Aviation Regiment.

It was equipped with US-made Republic F-84G Thunderjet jet fighter-bomber aircraft.

By the end of year 1964 the 88th Fighter-Bomber Aviation Regiment has been disbanded. The 236th Fighter-Bomber Aviation Squadron was also disbanded. Its personnel and equipment were attached to 235th Fighter-Bomber Aviation Squadron.

== Assignments ==
- 88th Fighter-Bomber Aviation Regiment (1961-1964)

== Bases stationed ==
- Batajnica (1961-1964)

== Equipment ==
- Republic F-84G Thunderjet (1961–1964)
