= 15th Aviation Brigade (Slovenian Armed Forces) =

15. Aviation Brigade
- Active: 1992 - 2008
- Country: Slovenia
- Allegiance: Slovenian Territorial Defence/ Slovenian Army
- Branch: Air Force Unit
- Part of: Brigade
- AF HQ: Cerklje ob Krki, Brežice

Insignia
- Roundel (1995-2008)

Aircraft flown
- Attack: Pilatus PC-9M Hudournik
- Trainer: Utva 75, Zlin Z-143, Zlin Z 242
- Transport: Pilatus PC-6 Porter, Let L-410 Turbolet, Eurocopter AS 532AL Cougar, Agusta Bell 412, Agusta Bell 206

The 15th Aviation Brigade was a brigade in the Air Force Unit of the Slovenian Armed Forces. The unit operated from 1992 to 2008, when it was disbanded.

== Aircraft Inventory ==
| Aircraft | Origin | Type | Versions | In service 1992 | In service 2008 | Notes |
|---|---|---|---|---|---|---|
| Bell 206 | United States | utility helicopter | 206B-3 JetRanger III | 2 | 4 | 2 in 1992, 1 bought in 1993 and 1 in 2007 |
| Bell 412 | United States | utility helicopter | | 3 | 8 | |
| UTVA-75 | Yugoslavia | basic trainer | V-53 | 14 | 0 | Retired in 2005 |
| Agusta AW109 | Italy | VIP transport | | 1 | 0 | Retired in 1998 and transferred to the Slovenian Police |
| SOKO SA 341 Gazelle | France/Yugoslavia | transport | V-53 | 1 | 0 | defected from YPA in 1991 Crashed in 1994 and Retired 1996 |
| Eurocopter AS 532AL Cougar | European Union | utility helicopter | AS 532 UL/AL | 0 | 4 | Bought in 2004 |
| Pilatus PC-6 Porter | Switzerland | Paratroop training aircraft | | 0 | 2 | Bought in 1995 |
| Let L-410 Turbolet | Czech Republic | transport aircraft | | 0 | 1 | Bought in 1994 |
| Zlin Z 242 | Czech Republic | basic trainer | Z 242L Aerobatic | 0 | 8 | Bought in 2004 |
| Pilatus PC-9 | Switzerland | turboprop trainer | PC-9A | 0 | 2 | Originally 3 bought in 1995, later 1 crashed in 2004 |
| Pilatus PC-9M Hudournik | Switzerland; Israel | turboprop trainer/attack fighter | PC-9M | 0 | 9 | bought in 1998, and upgraded with weapons in 1999 |
| Zlin Z-143 | Czech Republic | basic trainer | | 0 | 2 | Bought in 2004 |
