= 32nd Aviation Division =

Yugoslav Air Force unit

32nd Aviation Division: 32. vazduhoplovna divizija
- Active: 1945–1959
- Disbanded: 1959
- Branch: Yugoslav Air Force
- Type: Division
- Size: 3 regiments
- HQ: Pleso

The 32nd Aviation Division (Serbo-Croatian: 32. vazduhoplovna divizija/ 32. ваздухопловна дивизија) was a Yugoslavian military air unit originally established in 1945 as the 4th Aviation Bomber Division (Serbo-Croatian: 4. vazduhoplovna bombarderska divizija / 4. ваздухопловна бомбардерска дивизија).

== History ==
=== 1st Fighter Regiment ===
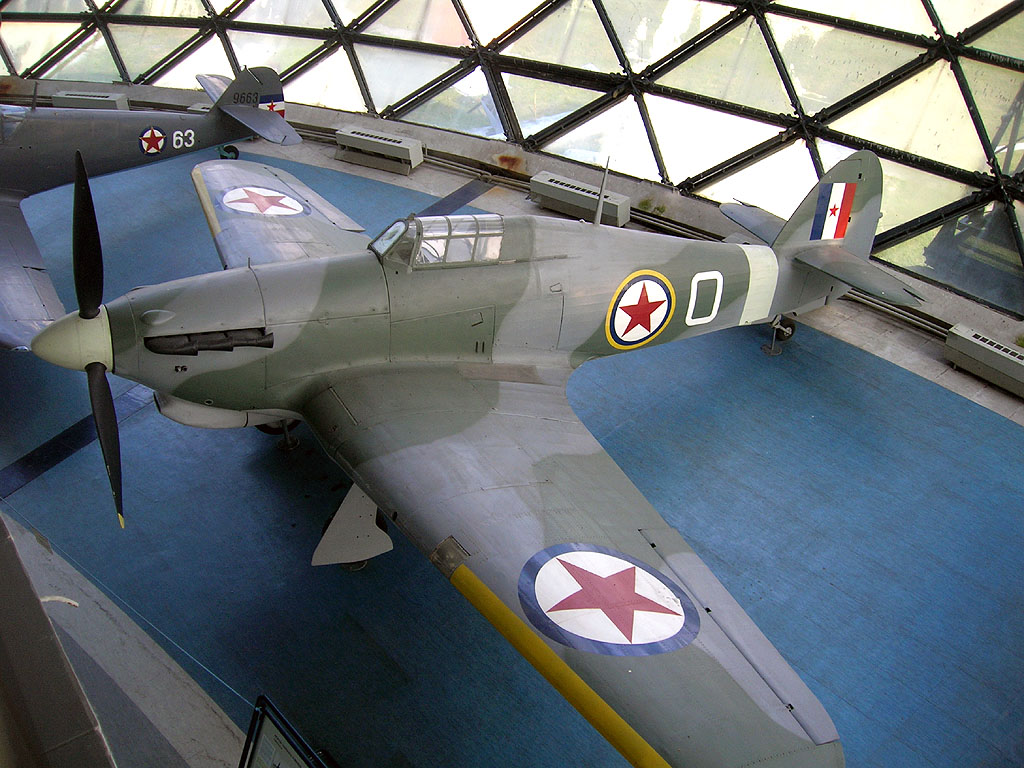
Hawker Hurricane Mk IVRP of No. 351 Squadron RAF, Museum of Aviation in Belgrade, Belgrade, Serbia, used by the 1st Fighter Regiment for its short existence.

The 1st Fighter Regiment (Serbo-Croatian Latin: 1. lovački puk, 1. ловачки пук) was an aviation regiment established 18 May 1945 as part of the Yugoslav Air Force. The regiment was stationed at Zadar Airport until it was disbanded after three months. The 1st Fighter Regiment was formed on 18 May 1945. It comprised aircraft and personnel from two former RAF squadrons, No. 352 and No. 351 that had been operated by Yugoslav personnel and equipped with British-made Hawker Hurricane Mk IV and Supermarine Spitfire Mk VC and IX fighter aircraft. The regiment, under the command of Đuro Ivanšević, was short-lived. It was disbanded by the end of August 1945, with its personnel sent to Sombor to contribute to the formation of the 4th Aviation Bomber Division. Some of its equipment was transferred to Mostar airport.

==== Aircraft ====
- Hawker Hurricane IV
- Supermarine Spitfire VC
- Supermarine Spitfire IX

=== 4th Aviation Bomber Division ===
The 4th Aviation Bomber Division was established by order from August 3, 1945, with headquarters at Sombor. The division was direct under the Command of Yugoslav Air Force. It consisted from 41st and 42nd Bomber Aviation Regiment.

In 1947, 43rd Bomber Aviation Regiment, the third regiment attached to this division, was established.

By 1948, this division was renamed for conventional purposes to 32nd Aviation Bomber Division (Serbo-Croatian: 32. vazduhoplovna bombarderska divizija/ 32. ваздухопловна бомбардерска дивизија).

The commanders of division in this period were Božo Lazarević and Sava Poljanec. Commissars were Radoje Ljubičić, Drago Vuković and Ljubiša Čerguz.

=== 32nd Aviation Division ===
The 32nd Aviation Bomber Division was formed by renaming of 4th Aviation Bomber Division. It has moved from Sombor to Boronogaj and finally to Pleso in 1951 until it was disbanded.

In 1950, the division was attached to the 3rd Aviation Corps. It has relocated its headquarters from Zagreb to Cerklje. By 1957, it was renamed as the Aviation Fighter Division due to the replace of bomber aircraft with domestic-made fighters.

It was disbanded by the order on June 27, 1959, per the "Drvar" reorganization plan. It was transformed into the 5th Air Command.

The commanders of division in this period were August Canjko, Radoslav Jović, Milan Tojagić and Stanislav Perhavec. Commissars were Ljubiša Čerguz, Ivan Dolničar and Novak Matijašević until 1953.

== Assignments ==
- Command of Yugoslav Air Force (1945–1953)
- 3rd Aviation Corps (1949–1959)

== Previous designations ==
- 4th Aviation Bomber Division (1945–1948)
- 32nd Aviation Bomber Division (1948–1957)
- 32nd Aviation Fighter Division (1957–1959)

== Organization ==
=== 1945-1948 ===
- 4th Aviation Bomber Division
  - 41st Bomber Aviation Regiment
  - 42nd Bomber Aviation Regiment
  - 43rd Bomber Aviation Regiment

=== 1948-1959 ===
- 32nd Aviation Bomber Division /Fighter Division
    - Training Squadron of 32nd Aviation Division (1953–1959)
  - 88th Bomber Aviation Regiment
  - 109th Bomber Aviation Regiment
  - 184th Reconnaissance Aviation Regiment (1948–1953)
  - 40th Fighter Aviation Regiment (1955–1959)
  - 151st Air Base (1953–1959)

== Headquarters ==
- Sombor (1945–1948)
- Borongaj (1948–1951)
- Pleso (1951–1959)

== Commanding officers ==
- Major General Božo Lazarević
- Colonel Sava Poljanec
- Lieutenant-Colonel August Canjko
- Major General Radoslav Jović
- Colonel Milan Tojagić
- Colonel Stanislav Perhavec

=== Political commissars ===
- Colonel Radoje Ljubičić
- Colonel Drago Vuković
- Colonel Ljubiša Čerguz
- Colonel Ivan Dolničar
- Colonel Novak Matijašević
