= 3rd Aviation Corps =

3rd Mixed Aviation Corps: 3. mešoviti avijacijski korpus
- Active: 1949–1959
- Disbanded: 1959
- Country: Yugoslavia
- Branch: Yugoslav Air Force
- Type: Regiment
- HQ: Zagreb

The 3rd Mixed Aviation Corps (Serbo-Croatian: 3. mešoviti avijacijski korpus / 3. мешовити авијацијски корпус) was an aviation corps of the Yugoslav Air Force established in 1949 as 3rd Aviation Corps (Serbo-Croatian: 3. avijacijski korpus / 3. авијацијски корпус). It was formed by order from July 24, 1949, with command in Zagreb as join unit composed from three aviation divisions and one aviation technical division. In 1953 it was renamed in to Mixed Aviation Corps. Corps was disbanded by order from June 27, 1959, with the "Drvar" reorganization of the Air Force.

== Organization ==
    - Liaison Squadron of 3rd Aviation Corps
    - 112th Signal Battalion
    - 379th Engineering Battalion
  - 184th Reconnaissance Aviation Regiment (1953–1959)
  - 275th Air Reconnaissance Regiment (1955–1959)
- 21st Aviation Division
- 32nd Aviation Division
- 37th Aviation Division
- 34th Aviation Technical Division

== Commanding officers ==
- Vlado Maletić
- Viktor Bubanj

=== Political Commissars ===
- Branko Borojević
- Ivan Dolničar

=== Chiefs of Staff ===
- Matija Petrović
- Milan Tojagić
