= 5th Air Reconnaissance Regiment =

5th Air Reconnaissance Regiment: 5. puk VOJIN
- Active: 1955 - 1992
- Disbanded: 1992
- Country: Yugoslavia
- Branch: Yugoslav Air Force
- Size: 2 battalions
- Part of: 2nd Corps of Air Force and Air Defense
- Command: Zagreb

The 5th Air Reconnaissance Regiment (Serbo-Croatian: 5. puk VOJIN / 5. пук ВОЈИН) was an air reconnaissance and guidance regiment established in 1955 as 275th Air Reconnaissance Regiment, part of the SFR Yugoslav Air Force.

== History ==
The 275th Air Reconnaissance Regiment was established on June 8, 1955, from 105th Air Reconnaissance Battalion and 109th Air Reconnaissance Battalion with command at Zagreb. With "Drvar" reorganization plan in 1959, regiment was redesignated in to 5th Air Reconnaissance Regiment.

The regiment participated in combat operations in Slovenia and Croatia in 1991. Later that year it was withdrawn to Bosnia and Herzegovina. The regiment's command had to be transformed on January 20, 1992, to 2nd Air Reconnaissance Regiment, with command at Sarajevo, but due to the war in Bosnia and Herzegovina which started the same year, its establishment has never been completed.

== Assignments ==
- 3rd Aviation Corps (1955–1959)
- 5th Air Command (1959–1964)
- 5th Air Defense Zone (1964–1966)
- 15th Air Defense Division (1966–1986)
- 5th Corps of Air Force and Air Defense (1986–1992)
- 2nd Corps of Air Force and Air Defense (1992)

== Previous designations ==
- 275st Air Reconnaissance Regiment (1955–1959)
- 5th Air Reconnaissance Regiment (1959–1992)

== Commanding officers ==
- Colonel Anton Požeg
- Colonel Himzo Malohodžić
- Colonel Nikola Robić
- Colonel Živorad Grbović
- Lt. Colonel Borivoje Kovač
- Colonel Milenko Stojkovski
