= Liaison Squadron of 3rd Aviation Corps =

Liaison Squadron of 3rd Aviation Corps Eskadrila za vezu 3. vazduhoplovnog korpusa
- Active: 1950 – after 1959
- Disbanded: after 1956
- Country: Yugoslavia
- Branch: Yugoslav Air Force
- Type: Squadron
- Role: Liaison
- Part of: 3rd Aviation Corps
- Garrison/HQ: Borongaj

The Liaison Squadron of 3rd Aviation Corps (Serbo-Croatian: Eskadrila za vezu 3. vazduhoplovnog korpusa / Ескадрила за везу 3. ваздухопловног корпуса) was an aviation squadron of the Yugoslav Air Force formed in 1950 at Bornogaj airfield.

The squadron was part of 3rd Aviation Corps. It was equipped with various aircraft. The squadron was disbanded after 1956, estimated 1959.

== Equipment ==
- Polikarpov Po-2
- Yakovlev UT-2
- AS.10 Oxford MkI & II
- de Havilland DH 104 Dove IIB
- Supermarine Spitfire MkVC
