= 5th Corps of Air Force and Air Defense =

5th Corps of Air Force and Air Defense: 5. korpus ratnog vazduhoplovstva i protivvazdušne odbrane
- Active: 1964–1992
- Disbanded: 1992
- Country: Yugoslavia
- Branch: Yugoslav Air Force
- Type: Corps
- Size: 5 regiments
- HQ: Zagreb

The 5th Corps of Air Force and Air Defense (Serbo-Croatian: 5. korpus ratnog vazduhoplovstva i protivvazdušne odbrane/ 5. корпус ратног ваздухопловства и противваздушне одбране) was a joint unit of Yugoslav Air Force established in 1964 as 5th Aviation Corps (Serbo-Croatian: 5. vazduhoplovni korpus / 5. ваздухопловни корпус).

== History ==
=== 5th Aviation Corps ===
The 5th Aviation Corps was formed by order from May 8, 1964, due to the "Drvar 2" reorganization plan of the Yugoslav Air Force. It was created by transformation of 5th Air Command and its consolidation with units from 9th Air Command. It consisted of all aviation units from western part of Yugoslavia at military airports Pleso, Lučko, Cerklje, Bihać, Pula and Zemunik.

By order from February, 1986, it was renamed as the 5th Corps of Air Force and Air Defense.

In this period commanders of 5th Aviation Corps were Viktor Bubanj, Enver Čemalović, Radoje Ljubičić, Slobodan Alagić, Anton Tus, Čedomir Kovačević, Nikola Benić and Đorđije Zvicer.

=== 5th Corps of Air Force and Air Defense ===
The 5th Corps of Air Force and Air Defense was for me in February 1986, by order to organize three corps of Air Force and Air Defense. The corps area of responsibility was of northwest Yugoslavia.

Units of 5th Corps of Air Force and Air Defense have participated in combat operations since end of June 1991. During the combats, in September 1991 command of corps has been dislocated to Bihać Air Base. Due to the withdrawal of Yugoslav People's Army units from hostile territory of Slovenia and Croatia, the area of responsibility has been reduced and some military airports, barracks and bases have been abandoned.

The units of 5th Corps have been intensively engaged in combat due they were located at the territory affected by wars in Slovenia, Croatia and later in Bosnia and Herzegovina. It is notable that units of 5th Corps had only Yugoslav Air Force air-to-air victory and that four pilots of Croatian nationality have defected with their MiG-21 fighters.

There was plan to reorganized corps in to 2nd Corps of Air Force and Air Defense from units that have been withdrawn to territory of Bosnia and Herzegovina and but that plan was never realized.

By May 12, 1992, the 5th Corps of Air Force and Air Defense has been disbanded. It was planned to withdraw all units and equipment from territory of Bosnia and Herzegovina to Serbia and Montenegro. Some units consisting mostly of Bosnian Serbs refused that order forming the new Republika Srpska Air Force.

In this period commanders of 5th Corps of Air Force and Air Defense were Zvonko Jurjević, Živan Mirčetić, Marjan Rožić and Ljubomir Bajić.

== Assignments ==
- Command of Yugoslav Air Force (1964-1992)

== Previous designations ==
- 5th Aviation Corps (1964-1986)
- 5th Corps of Air Force and Air Defense (1986-1992)

== Organization ==
=== 1964-1966 ===
- 5th Aviation Corps
    - 289th Signal Battalion
    - 379th Engineering Battalion
    - 122nd Hydroplane Liaison Squadron
  - 97th Support Aviation Regiment
  - 109th Fighter-Bomber Aviation Regiment
  - 111th Support Aviation Regiment
  - 117th Fighter Aviation Regiment
  - 184th Reconnaissance Aviation Regiment
  - 172nd Fighter-Bomber Aviation Regiment
  - 84th Air Base
  - 151st Air Base
  - 200th Air Base
  - 258th Air Base
  - 474th Air Base

=== 1966-1968 ===
- 5th Aviation Corps
    - 289th Signal Battalion
    - 379th Engineering Battalion
  - 97th Support Aviation Regiment
  - 82nd Aviation Brigade
  - 111th Support Aviation Regiment
  - 84th Air Base
  - 151st Air Base
  - 200th Air Base
  - 258th Air Base
  - 474th Air Base

=== 1968-1978 ===
- 5th Aviation Corps
    - 289th Signal Battalion
    - 379th Engineering Battalion
  - 82nd Aviation Brigade
  - 111th Support Aviation Regiment
  - 84th Air Base
  - 151st Air Base
  - 200th Air Base
  - 258th Air Base
  - 474th Air Base
  - 130th Air Base

=== 1978-1986 ===
- 5th Aviation Corps
    - 289th Signal Battalion
    - 379th Engineering Battalion
    - 351st Reconnaissance Aviation Squadron (until 1982)
    - 466th Light Combat Aviation Squadron (until 1982)
    - 467th Light Combat Aviation Squadron (until 1984)
  - 15th Air Defense Division
  - 82nd Fighter-Bomber Aviation Regiment (Aviation Brigade)
  - 111th Transport Aviation Regiment (Aviation Brigade)
  - 84th Air Base
  - 151st Air Base
  - 200th Air Base
  - 258th Air Base
  - 474th Air Base
  - 130th Air Base

=== 1986-199 ===
- 5th Corps of Air Force and Air Defense
    - 289th Signal Battalion
    - 379th Engineering Battalion
  - 5th Air Reconnaissance Regiment
  - 155th Air Defense Missile Regiment
  - 350th Air Defense Missile Regiment
  - 82nd Aviation Brigade
  - 111th Aviation Brigade
  - 117th Fighter Aviation Regiment
  - 84th Air Base
  - 151st Air Base
  - 200th Air Base
  - 258th Air Base
  - 474th Air Base

== Headquarters ==
- Zagreb (1964-1991)
- Bihać (1991-1992)

== Commanding officers ==
Date appointed	Name
1964-1970	Viktor Bubanj
1970-1972	Enver Čemalović
1972-	Radoje Ljubičić
	Slobodan Alagić
-1981	Anton Tus
1981-1983	Čedomir Kovačević
1983-1985	Nikola Benić
1985-1986	Đorđije Zvicer
1986-1987	Zvonko Jurjević
1987-1990	Živan Mirčetić
1990-1991	Marjan Rožić
1991-1992	Ljubomir Bajić
