= Ikarus S-49 =

Yugoslav fighter aircraft

S-49
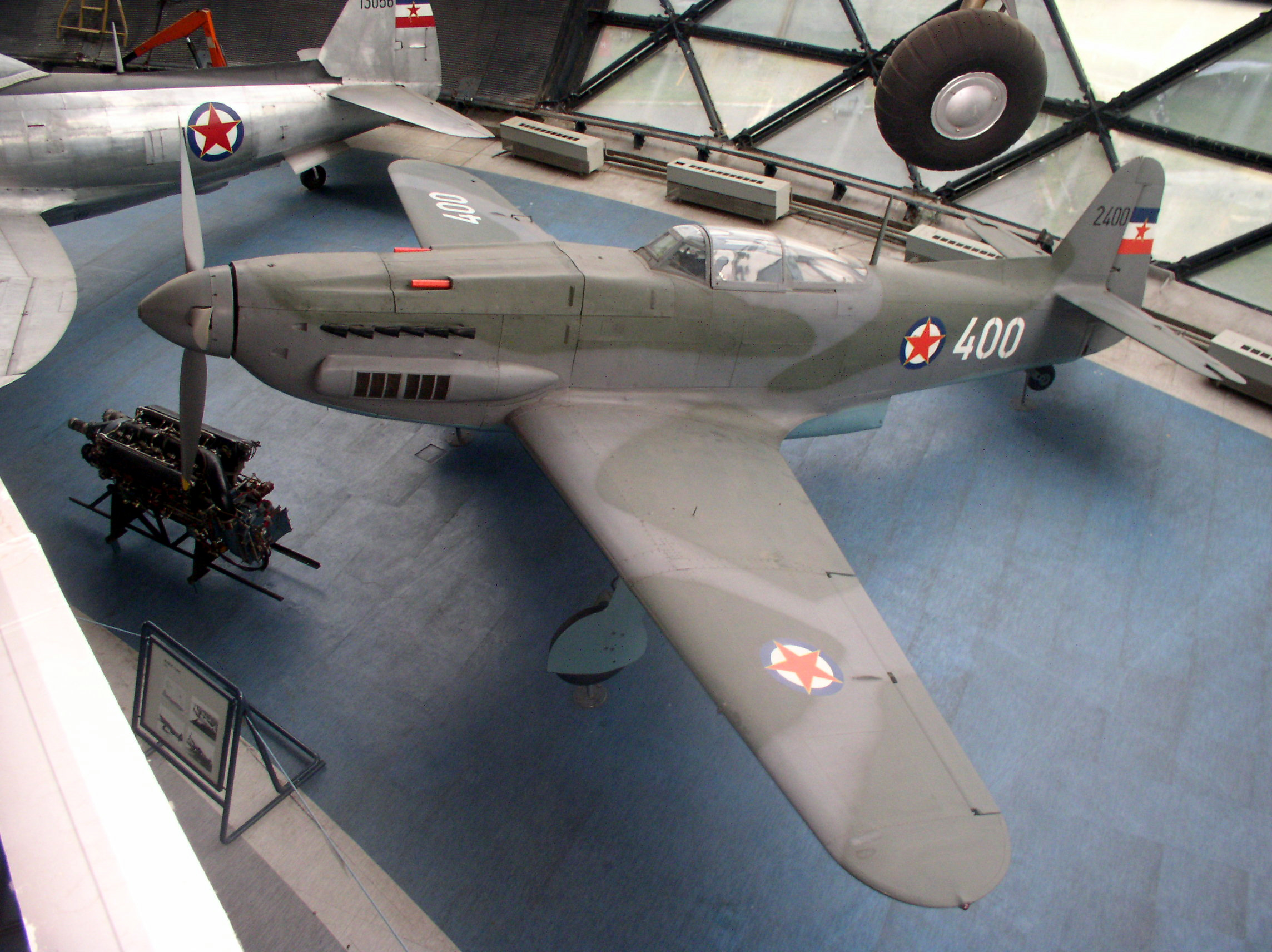
- An Ikarus S-49C on display at the Museum of Aviation in Belgrade, Serbia

General information
- Type: Fighter
- Manufacturer: Ikarus Aircraft Factory
- Designer: Kosta Sivčev, Svetozar Popović, Slobodan Zrnić
- Primary user: Yugoslav Air Force
- Number built: 158

History
- Introduction date: 1950
- First flight: June 1949
- Retired: 1961
- Developed from: Rogožarski IK-3

The Ikarus S-49 is a Yugoslav single-seat, single-engine fighter aircraft built for the Yugoslav Air Force (Serbo-Croatian: Ratno vazduhoplovstvo i protivvazdušna obrana – RV i PVO) shortly after World War II. Following the Tito–Stalin Split in 1948, the Yugoslav Air Force was left with an aircraft inventory consisting of mostly Soviet aircraft. Unable to acquire new aircraft or spare parts for its existing fleet, they turned to its domestic aviation industry in order to create an indigenous design to fulfill the need for additional aircraft.

The result was the S-49A, designed by Kosta Sivčev, Svetozar Popović and Slobodan Zrnić, on the basis of the pre-war Rogožarski IK-3. The S-49A was surpassed by the improved S-49C, featuring an all-metal construction and a more powerful engine. A total of 45 S-49A and 113 S-49C were produced by the Ikarus Aircraft Factory in Zemun. The last aircraft were retired from service in 1960/61, having been replaced by more modern jet-powered aircraft.

== Development ==
After the Resolution of Informbiro in 1948 and the resulting breakup with the Soviet Union, Yugoslavia was forced to rely on its domestic military industry. The same constructors that built the Rogozarski IK-3 (designers Ljubomir Ilic, Kosta Sivcev, Slobodan Zrnic) before the war, engineers Kosta Sivcev, Slobodan Zrnic and Svetozar K. Popovic, used existing technical documentation of the IK-3 to construct a new fighter aircraft, the Ikarus S-49. The first prototype of the S-49A flew in June 1949. The first operational aircraft were delivered to combat units at the beginning of 1950.

== Description ==
The S-49A was of mixed construction, with Soviet built VK-105 engines which were no longer available after 1948. Therefore, it was decided to produce a new version of the aircraft powered by the similar French Hispano-Suiza 12Z-17 engine. Because of the bigger and heavier engine, the new aircraft had to be of all-metal construction with a much longer nose. While the aircraft was mainly built by Ikarus, the wings and tail were built by the SOKO factory in Mostar. The armament remained the same as with the Ikarus S-49A and it consisted of one 20 mm Mauser MG-151/20 autocannon produced by Germany during World War II and two 12.7 mm Colt Browning machine guns. In addition, under wing racks for two 50 kg bombs or four 127 mm HVAR missiles were provided.

== Operational ==
At the beginning of 1952, the Ikarus S-49C was introduced into the units of the Yugoslav Air Force. About 130 S-49C were produced during the 1950s and they remained in service until 1961.

== Variants ==
- S-49A - mixed construction and Klimov M-105 engine (45 built)
- S-49B - planned version powered by a Daimler-Benz engine; unbuilt.
- S-49C - all-metal construction and Hispano-Suiza 12Z engine (113 built)

== Operators ==
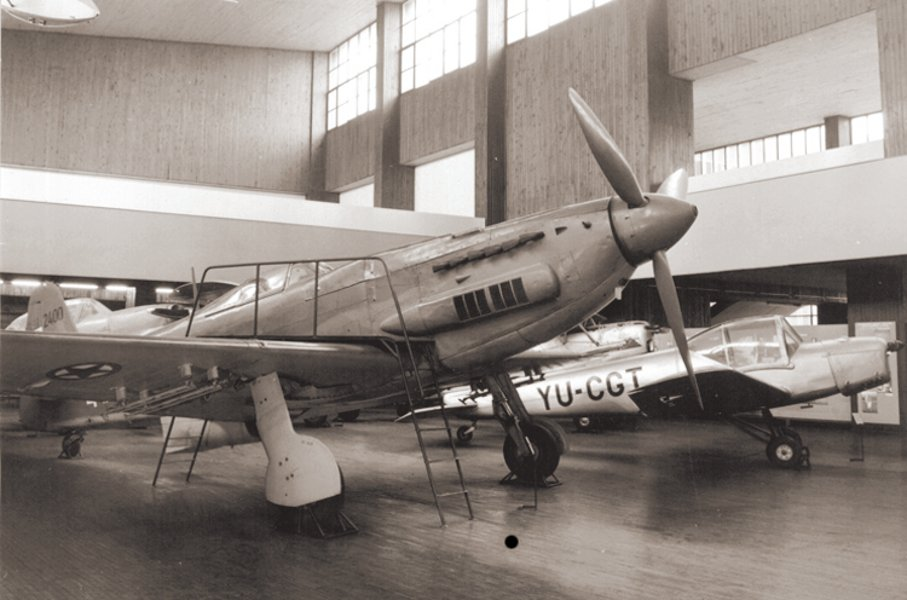
S-49C on display.

- Yugoslavia - Yugoslav Air Force
  - Ikarus S-49A - 46 aircraft (1949–1957)
    - 117th Fighter Aviation Regiment (1950–1953)
    - 204th Fighter Aviation Regiment (1950–1953)
    - 107th Fighter Aviation Regiment (1953–1957)
    - Training Squadron of 44th Aviation Division (1953–1954)
  - Ikarus S-49C - 112 aircraft (1952–1961)
    - 116th Fighter Aviation Regiment (1952–1960)
    - 185th Fighter Aviation Regiment (1953–1956)
    - 40th Fighter Aviation Regiment (1955–1959)
    - 109th Fighter Aviation Regiment (1956–1960)
    - 88th Fighter Aviation Regiment (1957–1959)
    - Training Squadron of 39th Aviation Division (1953–1959) S-49C

== Aircraft on display ==
Serbia

- Museum of Aviation (Belgrade) in Belgrade

Both variants of S-49A and C are on display.

== Specifications (Ikarus S-49C) ==
Data from The Complete Book of Fighters

General characteristics

- Crew: 1
- Length: 9.06 m (29 ft 9 in)
- Wingspan: 10.3 m (33 ft 10 in)
- Height: 2.9 m (9 ft 6 in)
- Wing area: 16.65 m^{2} (179.2 sq ft)
- Empty weight: 2,818 kg (6,213 lb)
- Max takeoff weight: 3,568 kg (7,866 lb)
- Powerplant: 1 × Hispano-Suiza 12Z-17 V-12 liquid-cooled piston engine, 1,104 kW (1,480 hp)
- Propellers: 3-bladed variable-pitch propeller

Performance

- Maximum speed: 628 km/h (390 mph, 339 kn) at 1,525 m (5,000 ft)
- Range: 690 km (430 mi, 370 nmi)
- Service ceiling: 10,000 m (33,000 ft)
- Time to altitude: 6,000 m (20,000 ft) in 6 minutes 54 seconds

Armament

- Guns:

- 1 × 20 mm MG-151/20 cannon in propeller hub
- 2 × 12.7 mm Browning M2 machine guns with 650 rounds per gun in upper cowling

- Rockets:

- 4 × 5 in HVAR

- Bombs:

- 2 × 50 kg (110 lb) bombs

== See also ==
Related development

- Rogozarski IK-3

Aircraft of comparable role, configuration, and era

- Avia S-199
- CAC CA-15 Kangaroo
- Focke-Wulf Fw 190
- Hawker Sea Fury
- Hispano Aviación HA-1112
- Lavochkin La-9
- Kawasaki Ki-100
- North American P-51 Mustang
- Supermarine Spitfire
- Yakovlev Yak-3

== Bibliography ==
- Buttler, Tony (2015). X-Planes of Europe. Vol. II: Military Prototype Aircraft from the Golden Age 1946–1974. Manchester, UK: Hikoki Publications. ISBN 978-1-90210-948-0.
