= 1st Air Command (Yugoslavia) =

1st Air Command: 1. vazduhoplovna komanda
- Active: 1959–1964
- Disbanded: 1964
- Country: Yugoslavia
- Branch: Yugoslav Air Force
- Type: Division
- Size: 4-5 regiments
- HQ: Batajnica Air Base

The 1st Air Command (Serbo-Croatian: 1. vazduhoplovna komanda/ 1. ваздухопловна команда) was a joint unit of the Yugoslav Air Force from 1959 to 1964, serving as the premier air force unit within Yugoslavia. The unit served during a time of uncertainty for the Yugoslav Air Force, in which internal and external forces put political pressure upon the force. This included the utilization of NATO and Soviet aircraft, and the eventual dissolution of the 1st Air Command in 1964.

== History ==
It was established by military order on 27 June, 1959 as a result of the "Drvar" reorganization plan of Yugoslav Air Force from the 44th Aviation Division. The headquarters were located in Batajnica. In 1961, it was reorganized.

On 2 May, 1964, due to the new "Drvar 2" reorganization plan of the Yugoslav Air Force, the 1st Air Command was transformed into the 1st Aviation Corps.

Its commander was Nikola Lekić.

== Organization ==
=== 1959-1961 ===
- 1st Air Command
    - 112th Signal Battalion
    - Liaison Squadron of 1st Air Command
    - Light Combat Aviation Squadron of 1st Air Command
  - 1st Air Reconnaissance Regiment
  - 88th Fighter-Bomber Aviation Regiment
  - 204th Fighter-Bomber Aviation Regiment
  - 119th Transport Aviation Regiment
  - 103rd Reconnaissance Aviation Regiment
  - 177th Air Base
  - 191st Air Base

=== 1961-1964 ===
- 1st Air Command
    - 112th Signal Battalion
    - 460th Light Combat Aviation Squadron
  - 1st Air Reconnaissance Regiment
  - 204th Fighter-Bomber Aviation Regiment
  - 88th Fighter-Bomber Aviation Regiment
  - 119th Support Aviation Regiment
  - 177th Air Base
  - 191st Air Base

== Headquarters ==
- Batajnica

== Commanding officers ==
- Colonel Nikola Lekić
