= 5th Air Command =

5th Air Command: 5. vazduhoplovna komanda
- Active: 1959–1964
- Disbanded: 1964
- Country: Yugoslavia
- Branch: Yugoslav Air Force
- Type: Division
- Size: 5 regiments
- HQ: Pleso

The 5th Air Command (Serbo-Croatian: 5. vazduhoplovna komanda/ 5. ваздухопловна команда) was a joint unit of Yugoslav Air Force.

== History ==
It was established by the order from June 27, 1959, year due to the "Drvar" reorganization plan of Yugoslav Air Force from the 37th Aviation Division with command at Pleso. In 1961 it suffered a change in the organization.

By the new "Drvar 2" reorganization plan of Yugoslav Air Force, on May 2, 1964 5th Air Command was transformed into 5th Aviation Corps.

The commanders of Air command was Radoslav Jović.

== Organization ==
=== 1959-1961 ===
- 5th Air Command
    - 289th Signal Battalion
    - 379th Engineering Battalion
    - Liaison Squadron of 5th Air Command
    - Light Combat Aviation Squadron of 5th Air Command
  - 5th Air Reconnaissance Regiment
  - 117th Fighter Aviation Regiment
  - 109th Fighter-Bomber Aviation Regiment
  - 111th Fighter-Bomber Aviation Regiment
  - 184th Reconnaissance Aviation Regiment
  - 151st Air Base
  - 258th Air Base
  - 474th Air Base

=== 1961-1964 ===
- 5th Air Command
    - 289th Signal Battalion
    - 379th Engineering Battalion
  - 5th Air Reconnaissance Regiment
  - 117th Fighter Aviation Regiment
  - 109th Fighter-Bomber Aviation Regiment
  - 111th Support Aviation Regiment
  - 184th Reconnaissance Aviation Regiment
  - 151st Air Base
  - 258th Air Base
  - 474th Air Base

== Headquarters ==
- Pleso

== Commanding officers ==
- Colonel Radoslav Jović
