= 103rd Reconnaissance Aviation Regiment =

103rd Reconnaissance Aviation Regiment: 103. izviđački avijacijski puk
- Active: 1947–1966
- Disbanded: 1966
- Country: Yugoslavia
- Branch: Yugoslav Air Force
- Role: Aerial reconnaissance
- Size: 2 aviation squadrons

The 103rd Reconnaissance Aviation Regiment (Serbo-Croatian: 103. izviđački avijacijski puk / 103. извиђачки авијацијски пук) was a unit established in 1947 as the Reconnaissance Aviation Regiment (Serbo-Croatian: izviđački avijacijski puk / извиђачки авијацијски пук).

== History ==
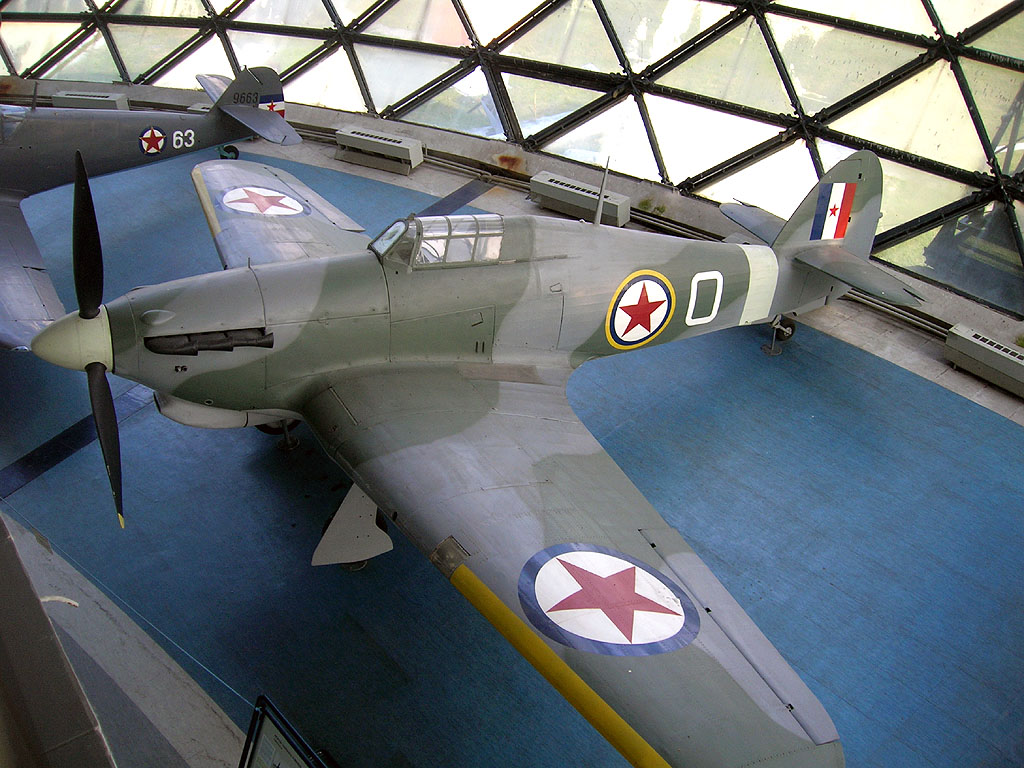
Hawker Hurricane Mk IVRP of No. 351 Squadron RAF, at the Museum of Aviation in Belgrade, Belgrade, Serbia, it was used by the 103rd Reconnaissance Aviation Regiment from 1947 to 1951

=== Reconnaissance Aviation Regiment ===
The regiment was formed on May 10, 1947, at Mostar from Hurricane and Spitfire fighters of the former 1st Fighter Regiment and Harvard trainers. It was subordinated to the direct command of the Yugoslav Air Force.

By 1948 this regiment was renamed like all other units of the Yugoslav Army, becoming the 103rd Reconnaissance Aviation Regiment.

=== 103rd Reconnaissance Aviation Regiment ===
The 103rd Reconnaissance Aviation Regiment was based at Mostar airfield until 1949, when it was re-located to Pančevo airport. In 1952 it moved briefly to Batajnica Air Base, and it subsequently returned to Pančevo where it remained until 1960 when it moved to Tuzla. It was equipped with British-made fighters and trainers, domestic Aero 2 trainers and Soviet Yak-9P fighters until 1951 when they were replaced with British-made Mosquito Mk 38 night fighters. By 1952 the regiment was subordinated to the 44th Aviation Division. In 1953 it was attached to the 7th Air Corps. The Mosquitos were replaced by US-made RT-33A reconnaissance jets by 1956.

By 1961 the "Drvar" system was being used to identify squadrons, the two units of the 103rd Reconnaissance Aviation Regiment became the 350th and the 351st Reconnaissance Aviation Squadrons.

It was disbanded in 1966 due to an order of February 17 of the same year. Its 351st Reconnaissance Aviation Squadron was also disbanded, while the 350th Reconnaissance Aviation Squadron was attached to the 98th Aviation Brigade.

The commanders of the regiment were Mića Marijanović, Spasen Zarevski, Miljenko Lipovščak, Ante Sardelić, Nikola Žutić, Tomaš Samardžić, Stojan Mutić, Borivoje Petkov and Stevan Leka.

== Assignments ==
- Command of Yugoslav Air Force (1947–1953)
- 44th Aviation Division (1952–1953)
- 7th Aviation Corps (1953–1959)
- 1st Air Command (1959–1960)
- 7th Air Command (1960–1964)
- 1st Aviation Corps (1964–1966)

== Previous designations ==
- Reconnaissance Aviation Regiment (1947–1948)
- 103rd Reconnaissance Aviation Regiment (1948–1966)

== Organization ==
=== 1961-1964 ===
- 103rd Reconnaissance Aviation Regiment
  - 350th Reconnaissance Aviation Squadron
  - 351st Reconnaissance Aviation Squadron

== Bases stationed ==
- Mostar (1947–1949)
- Pančevo (1949–1951)
- Batajnica (1952)
- Pančevo (1952–1960)
- Tuzla (1960–1966)

== Commanding officers ==
Date appointed	Name
	Mića Marijanović
1951	Spasen Zarevski
1953	Miljenko Lipovščak
1954	Ante Sardelić
1955	Nikola Žutić
1959	Tomaš Samardžić
January 5, 1961	Stojan Mutić
July 23, 1963	Borivoje Petkov
March 9, 1964	Stevan Leka

== Equipment ==
- Hawker Hurricane IV (1947–1951)
- Supermarine Spitfire VC (1947–1951)
- Supermarine Spitfire IX (1947–1951)
- Norodyn Harvard Mk IIB (1947–1951)
- Ikarus Aero 2B/C (1949–1951)
- Yakovlev Yak-9P (1950–1951)
- de Havilland Mosquito NF Mk 38 (1951–1956)
- Lockheed RT-33A/IT-33A Shooting Star (1956–1966)
