= Veliki Radinci =

Veliki Radinci Велики Радинци (Serbian)
- Village (Selo)
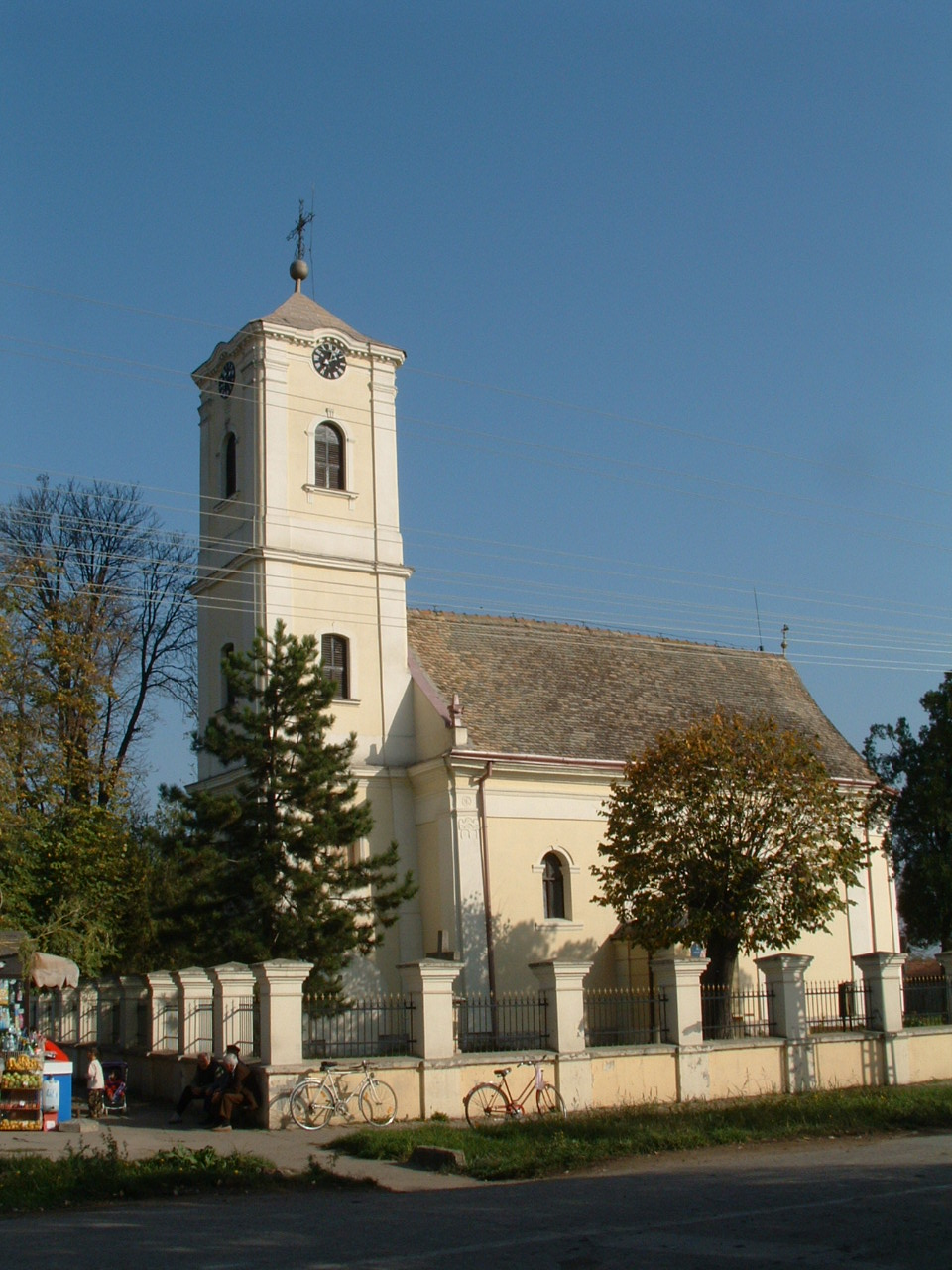
- Orthodox church of Saint Archangel Gavrilo in the village center

- Location within Vojvodina Location within Serbia Location within Europe
- Coordinates: 45°03′N 19°40′E
- Country: Serbia
- Province: Vojvodina
- Region: Syrmia
- District: Srem
- Municipality: Sremska Mitrovica

Area
  - Total: 23.3 km^{2} (9.0 sq mi)
- Elevation: 111 m (364 ft)

Population (2011)
  - Total: ▼1,426
  - Density: 69/km^{2} (180/sq mi)
- Time zone: UTC+1 (CET)
  - Summer (DST): UTC+2 (CEST)
- Postal code: 22211
- Area code: 022

Veliki Radinci (Serbian Cyrillic: Велики Радинци) is a village in Serbia. It is situated in the Sremska Mitrovica municipality, in the Syrmia District, Vojvodina province. The village has a Serb ethnic majority and had a population of 1,426, as of the 2011 census.

== Name ==
In Serbian, the village is known as Veliki Radinci (Велики Радинци), in Croatian as Veliki Radinci, and in Hungarian as Radinc. Its name derived from Serbian words veliki 'large, big' and raditi 'to work'. The name of the village in Serbian is plural.

== Demographics ==
1282 adult citizens live in the village. The average age of citizens is 39.1 years (37.8 for men and 40.4 for women). There are 607 households and the average number of members per household is 2.66. The majority of citizens are Serbs.

Graphic of the population change

Year	Population	
1900	2,034	
1921	991	
1931	1,130	
1953	968	
1961	1,325	
1971	1,513	
1981	1,620	
1991	1,570	1,544
2002	1,756	1,617
2011	1,426	

== See also ==
- List of places in Serbia
- List of cities, towns and villages in Vojvodina
