= Cerklje ob Krki =

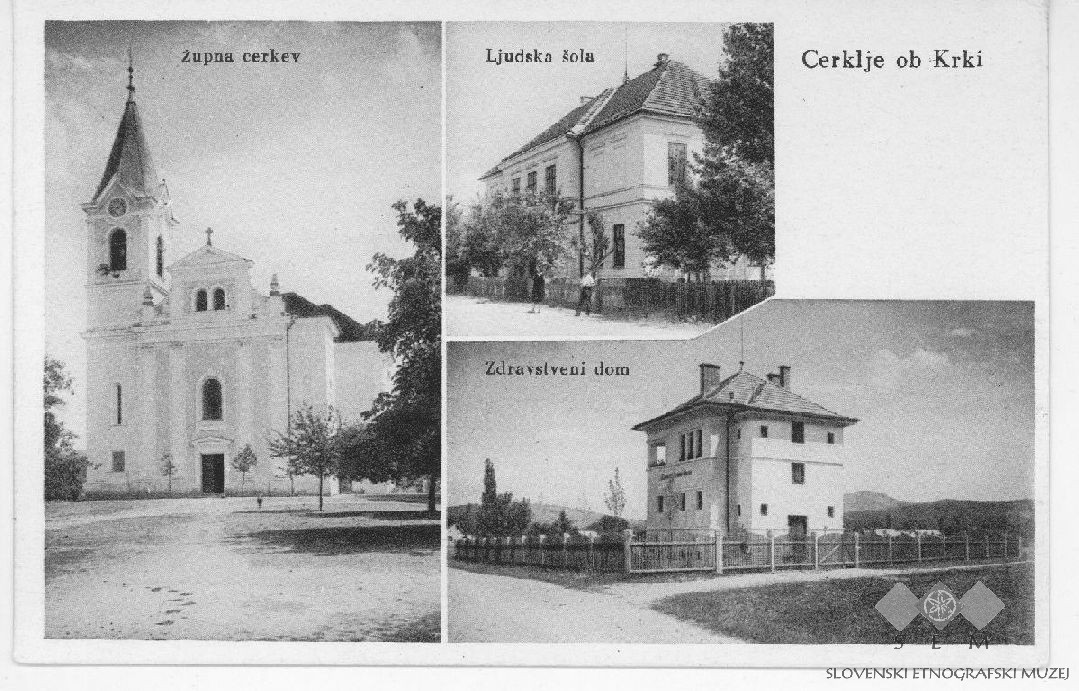
- Pre-World War II postcard of Cerklje ob Krki

- Location in Slovenia
- Coordinates: 45°53′3.99″N 15°31′12.88″E
- Country: Slovenia
- Traditional region: Lower Carniola
- Statistical region: Lower Sava
- Municipality: Brežice

Area
  - Total: 1.66 km^{2} (0.64 sq mi)
- Elevation: 154.5 m (507 ft)

Population (2020)
  - Total: 230
  - Density: 140/km^{2} (360/sq mi)

Cerklje ob Krki (pronounced [ˈtseːɾkljɛ ɔp ˈkəɾki]; German: Zirkle) is a settlement on the left bank of the Krka River in the Municipality of Brežice in eastern Slovenia. It is best known for the Cerklje ob Krki Airport north of the settlement. The area is part of the traditional region of Lower Carniola. It is now included in the Lower Sava Statistical Region.

== Name ==
The settlement was attested in written sources in 1331 as Zirkoviz, and in 1340 as Circowitz. The name Cerklje is derived from the plural accusative demonym *Cerkъvľane, based on the common noun *cerьky 'church' and therefore meaning 'people that live on church territory' or 'people that live in a settlement with a church'. The name of the settlement was changed from Cerklje to Cerklje ob Krki (literally, 'Cerklje on the Krka River') in 1955. The settlement was known as Zirkle in German in the past.

== History ==
Settlement of the area in antiquity is testified by the remains of a Roman aqueduct running through the village and a nearby Roman grave. A school was established in Cerklje ob Krki in 1854. During the Second World War, in October 1941 the German authorities evicted 30 families from the settlement and resettled Gottschee Germans in their houses. In June 1943 the Partisan Cankar and Šercer brigades attacked the German air base near the settlement, destroying several aircraft. They also attacked a border guard station and military police station in the same operation. This was followed by an Allied air strike on the air base on 25 July 1944, a Partisan attack on a German unit stationed at the school building in October 1944, and a Partisan air strike on the air base in spring 1945. In May 1945 Ustaša forces burned six farm buildings in the settlement.

On 8 August 2013, a temperature of 40.8 °C (105.4 °F) was recorded. This is the highest temperature to have ever been recorded in Slovenia.

On May 13, 2026, in Dobrava Memorial Park near Maribor, the Slovenian Directorate for War Veterans and Military Heritage handed over to Croatia the remains of Croatian victims of the killings after the Second World War; 161 of them were men 18 to 40 years old, exhumed from 2013 to 2017 in Cerklje ob Krki.

== Church ==
The parish church is dedicated to Saint Mark and belongs to the Roman Catholic Diocese of Novo Mesto. It was built in 1905 to replace a building dating from the beginning of the 17th century. Cerklje ob Krki was elevated to a parish in 1689. The parish cemetery is located west of the church, along the road to Kostanjevica na Krki.

== Notable people ==
Notable people that were born or lived in Cerklje ob Krki include:

- Mihael Butara (born 1922), Partisan major general
- Martin Končnik (1841–1891), parish priest and hymn writer
- Andrej Račič (1808–1883), organ builder
- Maja Šlajpah (born 1919), technical writer and library specialist
