= Soko J-20 Kraguj =

Military aircraft in the Yugoslav Air Force

J-20 Kraguj
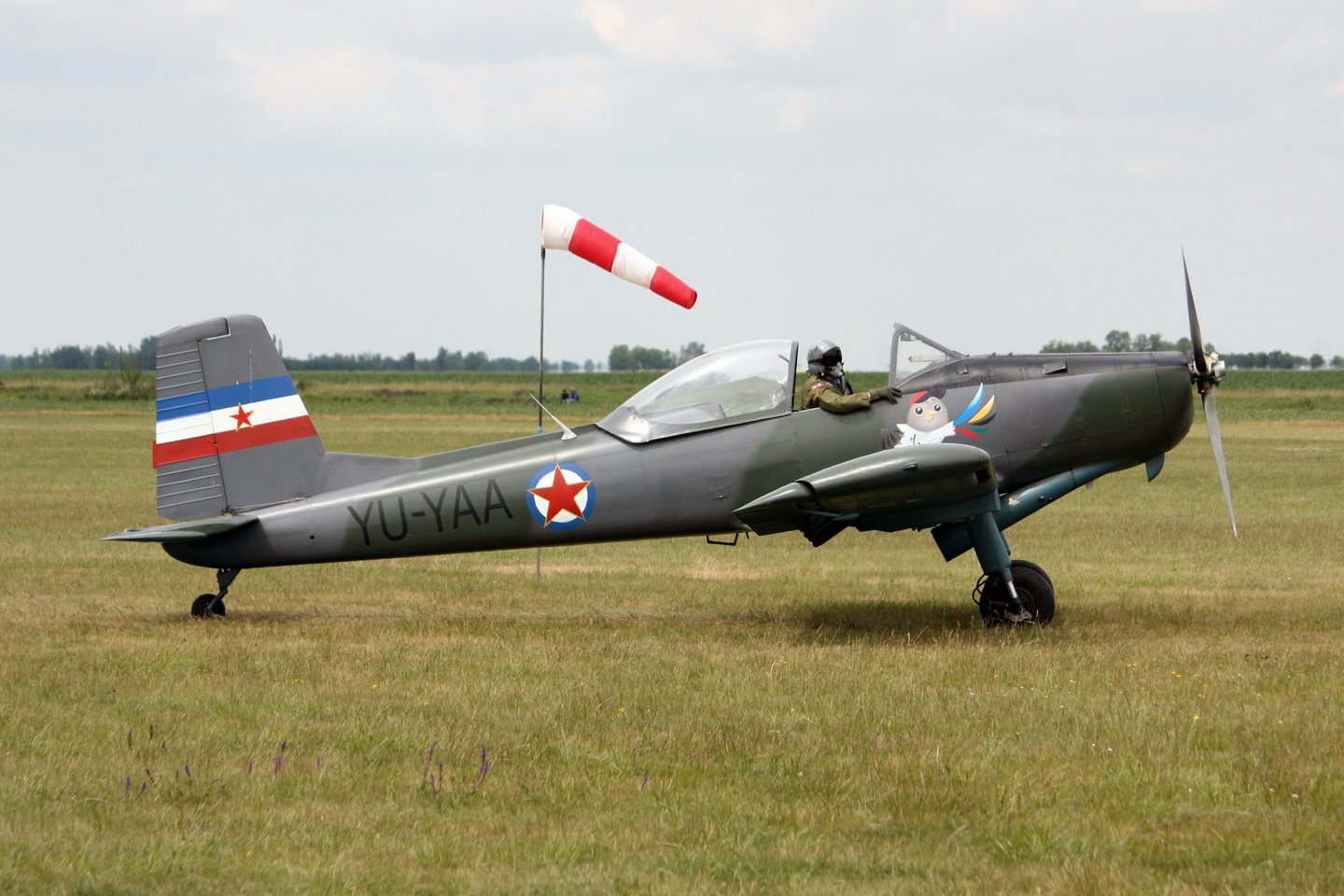
- J-20 Kraguj in private collection with Yugoslav marks at a local airshow in Serbia, 2009.

General information
- Type: COIN aircraft
- Manufacturer: SOKO
- Designer: Aeronautical Technical Institute
- Status: Retired in 1989
- Primary user: Yugoslav Air Force (1967–1989)
- Number built: 43

History
- Manufactured: 1964–1977
- Introduction date: 1964
- First flight: 21 November 1962

The Soko J-20 Kraguj (from Serbian: крагуј, lit. 'sparrowhawk') is a light military, single-engine, low-wing single-seat aircraft with a metal airframe, capable of performing close air support, counterinsurgency (COIN), and reconnaissance missions, that was designed by VTI and manufactured by SOKO of Yugoslavia, first flown in 1962.

== Design ==
It is of classic semi-monocoque, metal structure with a slightly tapered wing. The pilot is accommodated in an enclosed, heated and ventilated cockpit with adjustable seats. The cockpit canopy slides backwards to open. The landing gear is non-retractable with a tail wheel. Rubber dampers provide shock absorption, and hydraulic brakes are used for wheel braking.

The power plant comprises one 340 hp Textron Lycoming GSO-480-B1J6 piston engine and Hartzell HC-B3Z20-1/10151C-5 three-blade metal variable-pitch propeller. The engine cooling airflow is intensified by means of two specially designed ejectors. 36 US Gal of fuel contained in two rubber tanks enables a flight range of 350 NM for the fully armed configuration of the aircraft. 28 V DC electric power is supplied from a 1,5 kW generator and a storage battery. De-fogging and de-icing of the windshield is done by blowing of hot air.

=== Armament ===
Permanent armament comprises two wing-mounted 7.7 mm Colt–Browning Mk II machine guns with 650 rounds each and a collimator sight in the cockpit. For combat missions there is a capacity for an external load of bombs and two 57 mm and two 128 mm (HVAR-5) air-to-ground rocket launchers. Adapters on the underwing pylons can be used to switch the armament configuration from free-fall bombs to multi-tube launchers with twelve 57 mm air-to-ground rockets. Cluster, bombs, cargo bombs, and 128 mm air-to-ground rockets can be fitted.

== Operation ==
Drawing on the nation's experience in WWII, Yugoslav military planners assumed that any potential aggressor would disable airfields early in the conflict. The Kraguj was therefore intended to provide a limited reconnaissance-gathering and strike capability to guerilla and insurgent groups in the event of the neutralization of the Yugoslav Air Force, and was referred to as a "Partisan aircraft". It was designed to operate from short, unprepared auxiliary airfields, especially in mountainous regions, and could be fitted with skis. In addition to its primary role as a ground support platform, it was also used as a trainer, both for basic visual day/night flight and for more advanced ground attack training.

== Former operators ==
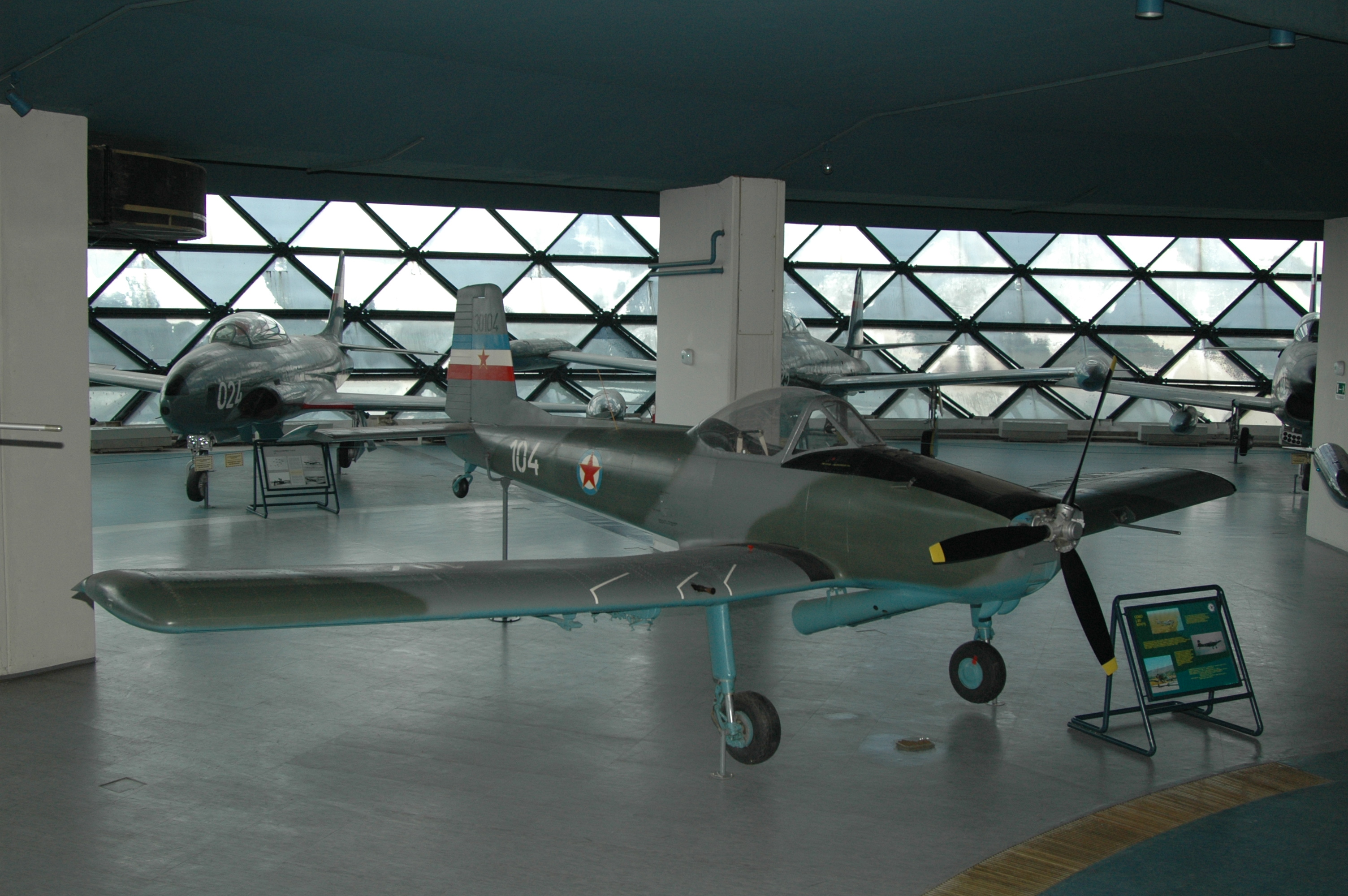
Yugoslavian J-20 Kraguj on display in the Museum of Aviation in Belgrade, Serbia

Croatia

- Croatian Air Force

Republika Srpska

- Republika Srpska Air Force

Yugoslavia

- SFR Yugoslav Air Force

== Specifications (J-20) ==
Data from Jane's All the World's Aircraft 1969-70

General characteristics

- Crew: 1
- Length: 7.93 m (26 ft 0 in)
- Wingspan: 10.64 m (34 ft 11 in)
- Height: 3.00 m (9 ft 10 in)
- Wing area: 17.0 m^{2} (183 sq ft)
- Aspect ratio: 6:1
- Airfoil: NACA 4415
- Empty weight: 1,130 kg (2,491 lb)
- Max takeoff weight: 1,624 kg (3,580 lb)
- Fuel capacity: 240 L (53 imp gal; 63 US gal)
- Powerplant: 1 × Lycoming GSO-480-B1A6 6-cylinder air-cooled horizontally-opposed piston engine, 250 kW (340 hp)
- Propellers: 3-bladed Hartzell HC-B3Z20-1 constant-speed propeller, 2.44 m (8 ft 0 in) diameter

Performance

- Maximum speed: 295 km/h (183 mph, 159 kn) at 1,500 m (4,900 ft)
- Cruise speed: 280 km/h (170 mph, 150 kn) at 1,500 m (4,900 ft)
- Stall speed: 88 km/h (55 mph, 48 kn) (flaps down)
- Range: 800 km (500 mi, 430 nmi)
- Rate of climb: 8.00 m/s (1,575 ft/min)
- Take-off run to 15 m (50 ft): 189 m (620 ft)
- Landing run from 15 m (50 ft):: 324 m (1,063 ft)

Armament

- Guns: 2 × 7.7 mm Colt–Browning Mk.II machine guns (650 rounds each)
- Rockets: 2 × 12 round rocket pack or 6 × 57 mm or 127 mm rocket
- Bombs: 2 × 100 kg (220 lb) bombs

== See also ==
Aircraft of comparable role, configuration, and era

- Morane-Saulnier MS-1500
