= Cerklje ob Krki Airport =

Cerklje ob Krki Airport Letališče Cerklje
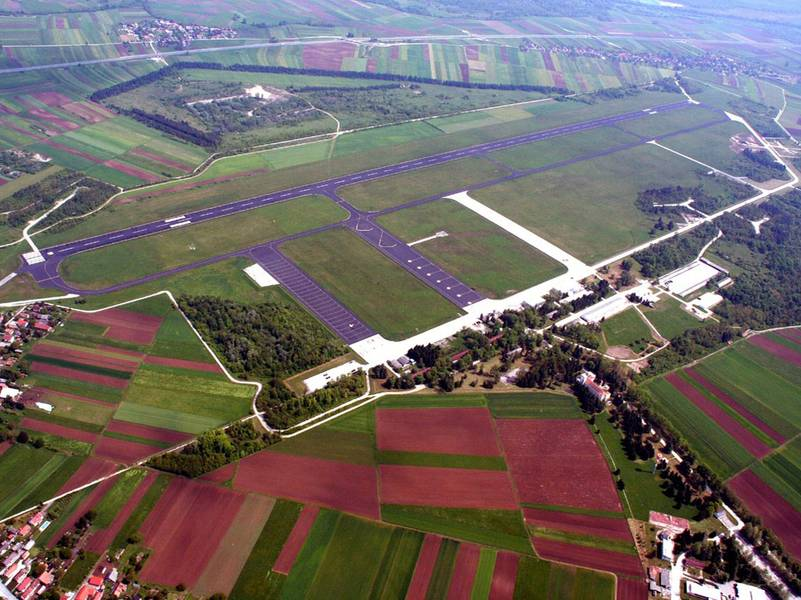
- IATA: none; ICAO: LJCE

Summary
- Airport type: Military airport
- Operator: Royal Yugoslav Army (1930s–1941), Nazi German Wehrmacht (1941–1945), Yugoslav People's Army (1945–1991), Slovenian Armed Forces, NATO (1991–present)
- Location: Cerklje ob Krki, Slovenia
- Elevation AMSL: 509 ft (155 m)
- Coordinates: 45°53′59″N 15°30′55″E
- Interactive map of Cerklje ob Krki Airport

Runways
Direction	Length		Surface
Direction	m	ft	Surface
08/26	3,000	9,843	Asphalt
	1,200	3,937	Grass
- Elevation: Slovenian Ministry of Defense

Cerklje ob Krki Airport (Slovene: Letališče Cerklje ob Krki) is the only military airport in Slovenia, and a civilian airport. The Cerklje ob Krki Air Base operates at it. The airport is in the midst of an enlargement and restructuring.

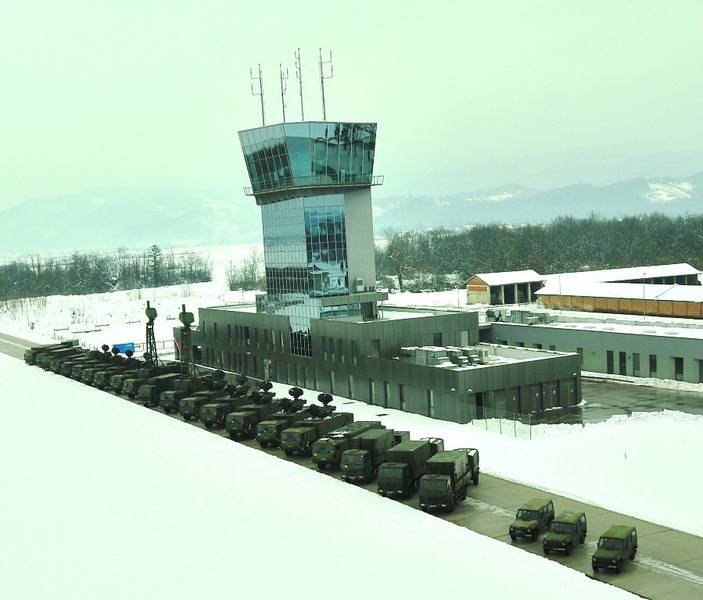
Roland Air Defense Missile Battery

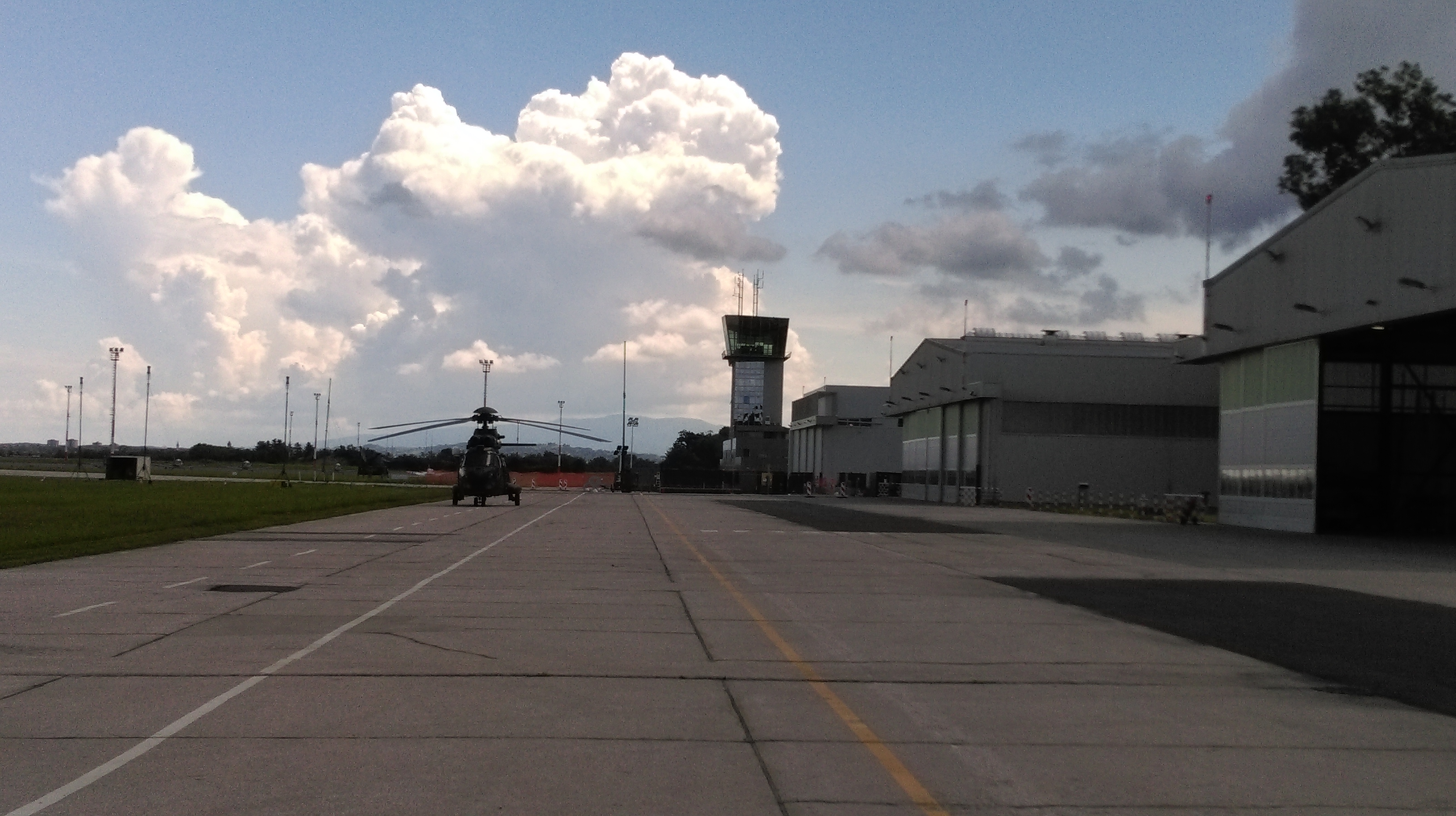
Slovene military airport at Cerklje ob Krki

== History ==
=== The beginnings ===
The earliest existence of the airport in Cerklje ob Krki was in the 1930s, where a grass runway created an auxiliary airfield. The military authorities of the Kingdom of Yugoslavia decided to build an airport in the location due to technical data based on favorable weather and geographical conditions. Whilst there were several airports in Slovenia at the time, only Cerklje was used strictly for military purposes. Due to this, less archival material exists to testify the airport's construction and development, though it is known to have taken place after larger facilities in Ljubljana and Maribor. Permanent infrastructure was built slowly following the grass runway was established, with wooden hangars.

=== World War II ===
In 1941 the Axis forces unexpectedly attacked the Kingdom of Yugoslavia and the first wave took place from the air. In April War, the air forces of the axis in a few days destroyed Kingdom of Yugoslavia Army Aviation. At the airport was then housed unit 6th air patrol group of Army Aviation, which operated for the purposes of the 7th Army. Army aviation units were on combat operations very poorly equipped for combat with their opponents. On the first day of the war early in the morning, the unit lost nine aircraft and is the remaining planes, the three Breguet XIX and a Fieseler Fi-156 "Stork", presented at the airport in a hillock nearby.

The German occupying forces in the autumn of 1941 carried out further consolidation, expanded and extended the landing-runway and built three brick buildings. Construction was completed in spring 1942. German occupying aviation is through the act of war against the rebels in battle facts, reconnaissance and in support of land forces with a number of different units. Very important is the role of play in the German operation "Roselsprung" and landing on 25th Drvar May 1944.

As an extremely strategic position was also attractive to partisans attacks by war twice in the attack, at the end of the war, however, attacked the partisan and the axis aviation. The airport was liberated 9 May 1945.

In April 2013 a mass grave associated with the Second World War was discovered at the airport. It contained the remains of 10 victims liquidated during or after the war.

=== Communist era ===
After the Second World War, the airport was taken over by the Yugoslav People's Army. The airfield was modified only by updating the runway during the Trieste riots in November 1953. That year the Yugoslav air force increased the number of aircraft and troops. At the end of the crisis, the airport remained key for defense of the northwest airspace of Yugoslavia. During the events of 1991, all Yugoslav units withdrew to Bosnia and Herzegovina and Serbia.

The airport has been a base for the following aircraft: Messerschmitt Bf 109, Ilyushin Il-2 šturmovik, P-47 Thunderbolt, F-84G Thunderjet, J-20 Kraguj, vulture J-21 Jastreb J-22 Orao.

=== Ten-Day War ===
During the summer of 1991 the deep rooted grievances that had been threatening the unity of the Federal state for some time finally came to a head when Slovenia initiated moves towards independence. At the end of June 1991 the JRViPVO was tasked with transporting soldiers and federal police to Slovenia. The Slovenes resisted this re-imposition of central control, which rapidly escalated into an armed conflict. Two air force helicopters were shot down, while the JRViPVO launched air strikes on TV transmitters and Slovenian territorial defence positions. After a political agreement, the federal forces left Slovenia and took all JRViPVO equipment with them.

=== Contemporary history ===
On 7 December 2006, the Slovenian Minister of Defence Karl Erjavec and three other Slovenian ministers signed a protocol about a reconstruction and development of the airport, including the building of the facilities that would enable for a transient landing of NATO aircraft. The move has been unpopular among Croatian residents, who have been concerned that the base would cause environmental and economic disruption. The renovation is part of a larger development plan of the area, named Project Phoenix, which includes the building of a civil terminal and of large business and economic areas.

The airport was closed for civilian traffic from 28 January 2012 till 18 February 2012 due to bad reflections from the windows of the control tower. To fix the problem, darker blinds had been placed in the tower.
