= List of Yugoslav Air Force regiments and brigades =

The regiment and brigade size units were main units of SFR Yugoslav Air Force during its existence, as parts of aviation divisions, commands and corps. Aviation regiments until "Drvar" reorganizations composed from three aircraft squadrons and one technical squadron, but after they composed from two to five aircraft squadrons. By the middle 1960s, some regiments had become brigades as they composed from more squadrons. They were equal to a USAF wing or RAF group. In organization of the Yugoslav Air Force there were also other branch regiments and regiments, as signal, air reconnaissance/intelligence and guidance, air defense and paratroop.

== Aviation regiments and brigades ==
=== Formed in period 1944-1948 ===
- 1st Fighter Regiment
- 113th Fighter Aviation Regiment
- 111th Fighter Aviation Regiment
- 112th Fighter Aviation Regiment
- 1st Yugoslav Fighter Regiment
- 254th Fighter Aviation Regiment
- 422nd Assault Aviation Regiment
- 423rd Assault Aviation Regiment
- 421st Assault Aviation Regiment
- 2nd Yugoslav Assault Regiment
- 554th Assault Aviation Regiment
- 1st Transport Aviation Regiment
- 42nd Bomber Aviation Regiment
- 41st Bomber Aviation Regiment
- 43rd Bomber Aviation Regiment
- Night Bomber Aviation Regiment
- 1st Training Aviation Regiment
- 2nd Training Aviation Regiment
- 3rd Training Aviation Regiment
- Reconnaissance Aviation Regiment

=== Renamed in 1948 ===
- 81st Assault Aviation Regiment (Fighter-Bomber)
- 83rd Fighter Aviation Regiment (Fighter-Bomber)
- 88th Bomber Aviation Regiment (Fighter, Fighter-Bomber)
- 94th Fighter Aviation Regiment (Fighter-Bomber)
- 96th Assault Aviation Regiment (Fighter-Bomber)
- 97th Bomber Aviation Regiment (Anti-Submarine, Support, Helicopter)
- 101st Fighter-Training Aviation Regiment (Training)
- 103rd Reconnaissance Aviation Regiment
- 104th Training Aviation Regiment
- 105th Assault-Training Aviation Regiment (Training, Fighter-Bomber)
- 107th Assault Aviation Regiment (Fighter, Fighter-Bomber, Helicopter, Support, Aviation, Mixed)
- 109th Bomber Aviation Regiment (Fighter, Fighter-Bomber)
- 111th Assault Aviation Regiment (Fighter-Bomber)
- 116th Fighter Aviation Regiment
- 117th Fighter Aviation Regiment (Fighter-Bomber)
- 119th Transport Aviation Regiment (Support, Helicopter)
- 184th Light Night Bomber Aviation Regiment

=== Formed in 1949 ===
- 185th Mixed Aviation Regiment (Fighter, Technical Group, Training, Fighter-Training, Fighter-Bomber)
- 198th Fighter Aviation Regiment (Fighter-Bomber)
- 204th Fighter Aviation Regiment (Fighter-Bomber)
- 138th Assault Aviation Regiment (Fighter-Bomber)
- 172nd Assault Aviation Regiment (Fighter-Bomber)

=== Formed after 1950 ===
- 267th Aviation Regiment of School of Reserve Officers
- 141st Training Aviation Regiment
- 150th Fighter-Bomber Aviation Regiment
- 184th Reconnaissance Aviation Regiment
- 40th Fighter Aviation Regiment
- 81st Support Aviation Regiment
- 111th Support Aviation Regiment (Transport, Helicopter)
- 138th Transport Aviation Regiment
- 82nd Aviation Brigade (Fighter-Bomber Regiment)
- 98th Aviation Brigade (Fighter-Bomber Regiment)
- 83rd Fighter Aviation Regiment (Aviation Brigade)
- 138th Transport Aviation Brigade
- 701st Aviation Brigade

== Non-aviation regiments and brigades ==
=== Air defense ===
- 250th Air Defense Missile Regiment (Brigade)
- 155th Air Defense Missile Regiment
- 350th Air Defense Missile Regiment
- 450th Air Defense Missile Regiment
- 200th Air Defense Light Missile-Artillery Regiment
- 399th Air Defense Light Missile-Artillery Regiment
- 492nd Air Defense Light Missile-Artillery Regiment

=== Paratroop ===
- 63rd Paratroop Brigade

=== Signal ===
- 322nd Signal Regiment

=== Air reconnaissance/intelligence and guidance ===
- 211th Air Reconnaissance Regiment
- 275th Air Reconnaissance Regiment
- 137th Air Reconnaissance Regiment
- 1st Air Reconnaissance Regiment
- 5th Air Reconnaissance Regiment
- 7th Air Reconnaissance Regiment
- 3rd Air Reconnaissance Regiment

== Notes and references ==
- Yugoslav Air Force 1942–1992, Bojan Dimitrijević, Institute for modern history, Belgrade, 2006
