= Aviation Regiment =

Aviation Regiment or Air Regiment is a type of military aviation unit, often used by the aviation corps of an army and equivalent to a Wing or Group, in most air forces.

== Albania ==
- Albanian Aviation Regiment 4020

== Australia ==
- Australian Army Aviation
  - 1st Aviation Regiment (Australia)
  - 5th Aviation Regiment (Australia)
  - 6th Aviation Regiment (Australia)

== Italy ==
- Air Fleet Command
- Air Logistic Command
- 1st Air Region

== Japan ==
- A Sentai (which is often translated as "regiment") was the basic unit of the Imperial Japanese Army Air Force.

== Poland ==
- Polish Army
- 36th Special Aviation Regiment

== Russia and the Soviet Union ==
=== Soviet Union ===
- Aviation regiment (Soviet Union)

== United Kingdom ==
- Army Air Corps (United Kingdom)
  - List of Army Air Corps aircraft units (United Kingdom)

== Yugoslavia ==
- 40th Fighter Aviation Regiment
- 81st Support Aviation Regiment
- 82nd Aviation Brigade, formerly 42nd Bomber Aviation Regiment and 109th Bomber Aviation Regiment
- 83rd Fighter Aviation Regiment, formerly 254th Fighter Aviation Regiment
- 88th Fighter-Bomber Aviation Regiment, formerly 43rd Bomber Aviation Regiment
- 94th Fighter Aviation Regiment, formerly 111th Fighter Aviation Regiment
- 96th Fighter-Bomber Aviation Regiment, formerly 423rd Assault Aviation Regiment
- 101st Fighter-Training Aviation Regiment, formerly 2nd Training Aviation Regiment
- 103rd Reconnaissance Aviation Regiment, formerly Reconnaissance Aviation Regiment
- 104th Training Aviation Regiment, formerly 1st Training Aviation Regiment
- 105th Fighter-Bomber Aviation Regiment, formerly 3rd Training Aviation Regiment
- 107th Mixed Aviation Regiment, formerly 421st Assault Aviation Regiment
- 111th Helicopter Regiment formerly 422nd Assault Aviation Regiment
- 116th Fighter Aviation Regiment, formerly 113th Fighter Aviation Regiment
- 117th Fighter Aviation Regiment, formerly 112th Fighter Aviation Regiment
- 119th Helicopter Brigade, formerly 1st Transport Aviation Regiment
- 141st Aviation Training Regiment
- 150th Fighter-Bomber Aviation Regiment
- 184th Reconnaissance Aviation Regiment, formerly the Night Bomber Aviation Regiment and 184th Light Night Bomber Aviation Regiment
- 185th Fighter-Bomber Aviation Regiment
- 267th Aviation Regiment of School of Reserve Officers
