= 29th Aviation Division =

29th Aviation Division: 29. vazduhoplovna divizija
- Active: 1944–1959
- Disbanded: 1959
- Country: Soviet Union; Yugoslavia
- Branch: Soviet Air Force; Yugoslav Air Force
- Type: Division
- Size: 3-4 regiments
- HQ: Niš
- Engagements: Syrmian Front

The 29th Aviation Division (Serbo-Croatian: 29. vazduhoplovna divizija/ 29. ваздухопловна дивизија) was a unit originally established in 1944 as the
11th Aviation Fighter Division (Serbo-Croatian: 11. vazduhoplovna lovačka divizija / 11. ваздухопловна ловачка дивизија). It was formed from Yugoslav partisan aviators, trained and equipped by the Soviet Air Force.

== History ==
=== 11th Aviation Fighter Division ===
The 11th Aviation Fighter Division was established on December 29, 1944, in Novi Sad, from Yugoslav partisan aviators with the Soviet Air Force 17th Air Army's 236th Fighter Aviation Division (236.IAD). It has become independent form Soviet command and personal since May 1945. Division was part of Group of Aviation Divisions, and it consisted from three fighter regiments. Its regiments took part in final operations for liberation of Yugoslavia. During the combat operations its headquarters was at Ruma. Division has about 987 personal, 112 officers, 250 NCO's and 625 soldiers. From that number 136 were pilots, and 647 were from technical service. It was armed with 115 Yak-1 fighter aircraft. By the August 1945 the division was reorganized and renamed to 1st Aviation Mixed Division (Serbo-Croatian: 1. vazduhoplovna mešovita divizija/ 1. ваздухопловна мешовита дивизија).

The commander of division in this period was Arsenije Boljević and commissars was Ljubiša Čurguz.

=== 1st Aviation Division ===
The 1st Aviation Mixed Division was formed by order from August 3, 1945, from 11th Aviation Fighter Division with headquarters at Skoplje. The division was direct under the Command of Yugoslav Air Force. In 1947 headquarters was dislocated from Skoplje to Niš been and division was renamed in to 1st Aviation Assault Division (Serbo-Croatian: 1. vazduhoplovna jurišna divizija/ 1. ваздухопловна јуришна дивизија). It has remain with only one regiment under its command.

By the 1948 year this division was renamed like all other units of Yugoslav Army, so it has become 29th Assault Aviation Division (Serbo-Croatian: 29. vazduhoplovna jurišna divizija/ 29. ваздухопловна јуришна дивизија).

The commanders of division in this period were Arsenije Boljević, Mirko Šćepanović and Ilija Zelenika. Commissars were Ljubiša Čurguz and Dragoman Radojčić.

=== 29th Aviation Division ===
The 29th Aviation Assault Division was formed by renaming of 1st Aviation Assault Division in 1948. It was reorganized to have again under his command three regiments.

In 1953 division was attached to 7th Aviation Corps. It was also renamed as an Aviation Fighter-Bomber Division due to the replacement of Soviet assault aircraft with US-made fighter-bombers.

It was disbanded by the order from June 27, 1959 per the "Drvar" reorganization plan. Its units were attached to 3rd Air Command.

The commanders of division in this period were Ilija Zelenika and Enver Ćemalović. Commissar was Dragoman Radojčić until 1953.

== Assignments ==
- Group of Aviation Divisions (1944−1945)
- Command of Yugoslav Air Force (1945−1953)
- 7th Aviation Corps (1953–1959)

== Previous designations ==
- 11th Aviation Fighter Division (1944−1945)
- 1st Aviation Mixed Division (1945−1947)
- 1st Aviation Assault Division (1947−1948)
- 29th Aviation Assault Division (1948−1954)
- 29th Aviation Fighter-Bomber Division (1954−1959)

== Organization ==
=== 1944−1945 ===
- 11th Aviation Fighter Division
  - 111th Fighter Aviation Regiment
  - 112th Fighter Aviation Regiment
  - 113th Fighter Aviation Regiment

=== 1945 ===
- 11th Aviation Fighter Division
  - 111th Fighter Aviation Regiment
  - 113th Fighter Aviation Regiment
  - 421st Assault Aviation Regiment
  - 554th Assault Aviation Regiment

=== 1945-1947 ===
- 1st Aviation Mixed Division
  - 111th Fighter Aviation Regiment
  - 554th Assault Aviation Regiment

=== 1947−1948 ===
- 1st Aviation Assault Division
  - 554th Assault Aviation Regiment

=== 1948−1959 ===
- 29th Aviation Assault/Fighter-Bomber Division
    - Training Squadron of 29th Aviation Division (1953–1959)
  - 81st Assault Aviation Regiment
  - 107th Mixed Aviation Regiment
  - 150th Fighter-Bomber Aviation Regiment (1952–1958)
  - 161st Air Base (1953–1959)

== Headquarters ==
- Ruma (1944−1945)
- Skoplje (1945−1947)
- Niš (1947−1959)

== Commanding officers ==
- Colonel Arsenije Boljević
- Lieutenant-Colonel Mirko Šćepanović (Declared himself for Resolution of Cominform 1948 and was killed during attempt to cross border into Albania.)
- Lieutenant-Colone Ilija Zelenika
- Colonel Enver Ćemalović

=== Political Commissars ===
- Lieutenant-Colonel Ljubiša Čurguz
- Colonel Dragoman Radojčić
