= 891st Helicopter Reconnaissance and Liaison Squadron =

891st Helicopter Reconnaissance and Liaison Squadron: 891. helikopterska eskadrila za izviđanje i vezu
- Active: 1952 – 1968; 1980 - 1992
- Disbanded: 1968; 1992
- Country: Yugoslavia
- Branch: Yugoslav Air Force
- Type: Squadron
- Role: Liaison
- Part of: 3rd Army
- Garrison/HQ: Skopski Petrovac

The 891st Helicopter Reconnaissance and Liaison Squadron (Serbo-Croatian: 891. helikopterska eskadrila za izviđanje i vezu / 891. хеликоптерска ескадрила за извиђање и везу) was an aviation squadron of the Yugoslav Air Force formed in 1952 at Skoplje airfield as Liaison Squadron of 3rd Military district (Serbo-Croatian: Eskadrila za vezu 3. vojne oblasti / Ескадрила за везу 3. војне области).

== History ==
The squadron was formed by order from December 17, 1951, on February 1, 1952, as part of the 3rd Military district. It was equipped with various training and liaison aircraft. The squadron was transformed into Liaison Squadron of 3rd Air Command (Serbo-Croatian: Eskadrila za vezu 3. vojne oblasti / Ескадрила за везу 3. војне области) by 1959.

After April 1961 and the Drvar reorganization of the Air Force, a new type of designation system began to be used to identify squadrons, so the Liaison Squadron of 3rd Air Command became the 891st Liaison Aviation Squadron.

It was equipped with domestic liaison Ikarus Kurir aircraft. In May 1961 it was reattached to the 81st Support Aviation Regiment. With the 81st Regiment being disbanded in 1964, the squadron was reattached to the 1st Aviation Corp and later to the 198th Regiment for a short time in 1965. The squadron was part of the 107th Support Aviation Regiment from 1965 until it was disbanded by order as of June 8. Its numeration has remained in reserve.

By order from January 9, 1980, the 891st Helicopter Flight (Serbo-Croatian: 891. helikoptersko odeljenje / 891. хеликоптерско одељење) was established at Skopski Petrovac military airfield with the 3rd Army of the Yugoslav People's Army for reconnaissance and liaison duties equipped with domestic-made SOKO SA 341 Gazelle helicopters. By order from March 1, 1985, it was designated as the 891st Helicopter Reconnaissance and Liaison Squadron. Due to the 1988 reorganization of the field armies of the Yugoslav People's Army, the 891st Squadron was strengthened for two flights, one at Niš airport (former 893rd Helicopter Reconnaissance and Liaison Squadron), and one at Golubovci Air Base (former 898th Helicopter Reconnaissance and Liaison Squadron).

The 891st Helicopter Reconnaissance and Liaison Squadron was disbanded in 1992 after the withdrawal of the Yugoslav People's Army from Republic of Macedonia.

== Assignments ==
- 3rd Military district (1952–1959)
- 3rd Air Command (1959–1961)
- 81st Support Aviation Regiment (1961-1964)
- 1st Aviation Corps (1964-1965)
- 198th Fighter-Bomber Aviation Regiment (1965)
- 107th Support Aviation Regiment (1965-1968)
- 3rd Army (1980-1992)

== Previous designations ==
- Liaison Squadron of 3rd Military district (1952–1959)
- Liaison Squadron of 3rd Air Command (1959–1961)
- 891st Liaison Aviation Squadron (1961-1965)
- 891st Helicopter Flight (1980-1985)
- 891st Helicopter Reconnaissance and Liaison Squadron (1985-1988)

== Equipment ==
- Polikarpov Po-2 (1952-1959)
- Fieseler Fi 156 (1952-1958)
- Utva 212 (1952-1959)
- Ikarus Aero 2 (1952-1959)
- Utva Aero-3 (1959-1961)
- Ikarus Kurir (1955-1968)
- Soko SA.341 Gazelle Hera (1980–1988)
