= 107th Mixed Aviation Regiment =

107th Mixed Aviation Regiment: 107. mešovita avijacijski puk
- Active: 1944–1992
- Disbanded: 1992
- Country: Yugoslavia
- Branch: Yugoslav Air Force
- Type: Regiment
- Part of: Military Aviation Academy
- Engagements: Syrmian Front; Yugoslav wars

The 107th Mixed Aviation Regiment (Serbo-Croatian: 107. mešoviti avijacijski puk / 107. мешовити авијацијски пук) was an aviation regiment established in 1944 as 421st Assault Aviation Regiment (Serbo-Croatian: 421. vazduhoplovni jurišni puk / 421. ваздухопловни јуришни пук).

== History ==
=== 421st Assault Aviation Regiment ===
The 421st Assault Aviation Regiment was established on December 20, 1944, in Laćarak, from Yugoslav Partisan aviators serving with the Soviet Air Force 17th Air Army's 165th Guards Assault Aviation Regiment (165.GShAP). It became independent from Soviet command and personnel in May 1945, and became part of the 42nd Aviation Assault Division, equipped with Soviet Ilyushin Il-2 ground-attack aircraft. The regiment took part in the final operations of the liberation of Yugoslavia, during which time it was based at Laćarak, Krnješevci, Zemun, Nadalj, Bački Brestovac and Sombor airfields.

After the war, the regiment was briefly stationed at Skopje before moving to Niš in late 1945. In 1948, the regiment was renamed in accordance with new Yugoslav Army conventions, and became the 107th Assault Aviation Regiment. The commanders of the regiment during this period were Dušan Božović and Dimitrije Kovačević, while the political commissar was Vinko Sever.

=== 107th Regiment ===
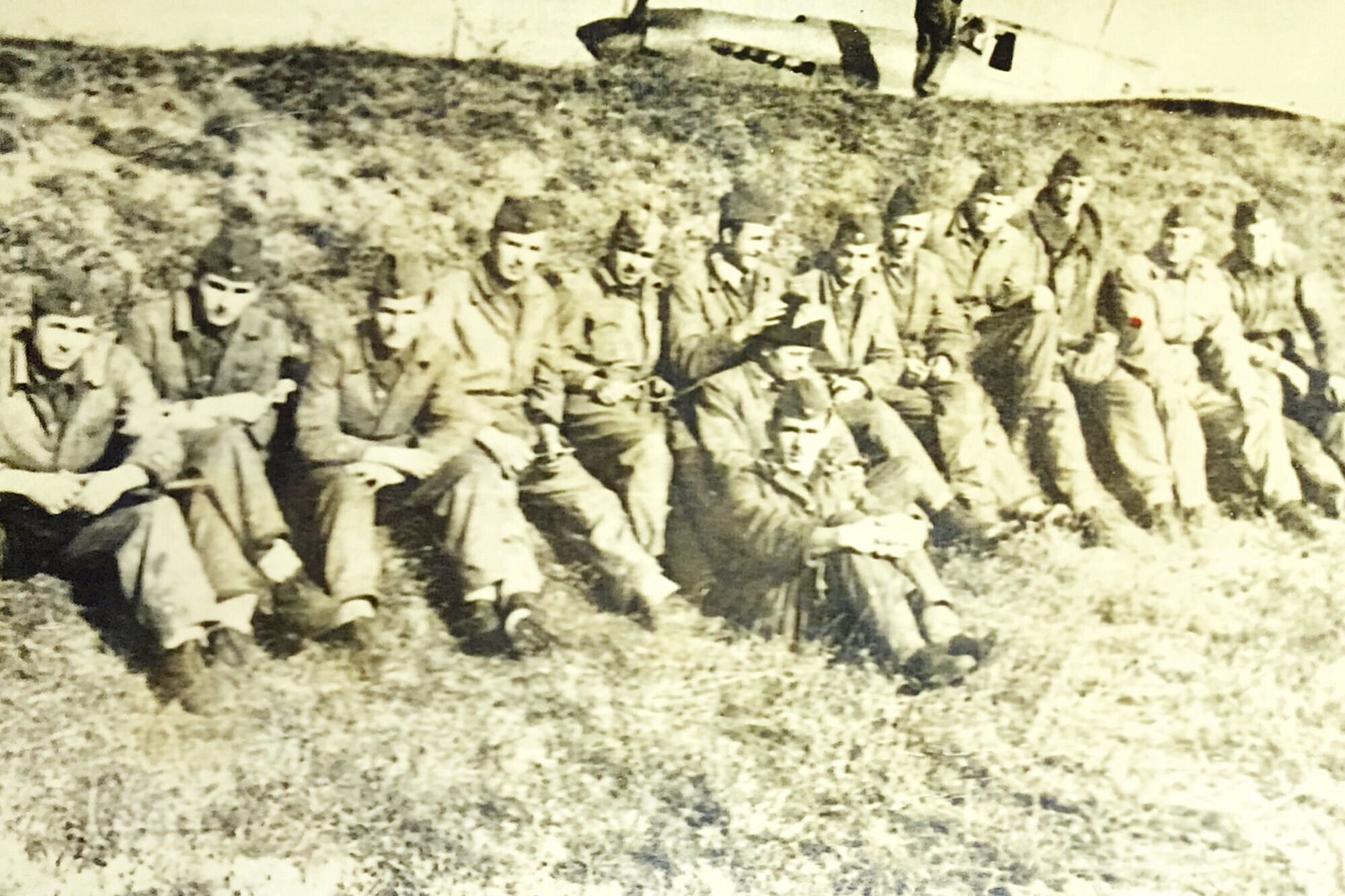
Pilots and crew belonging to 107th Assault Aviation Regiment, Yugoslav Air Force (107 IAP JRV) at Leskovac airfield, Serbia, FPR Yugoslavia cc.1949.

The 107th Assault Aviation Regiment remained at Niš for a short time, then in 1949 it was re-based at Leskovac, where it remained until 1953, when it returned to Niš. In 1953, the Soviet Ilyushin Il-2 attack aircraft were replaced with Yugoslav-made Ikarus S-49A fighter aircraft. The regiment was soon renamed the 107th Fighter Aviation Regiment (Serbo-Croatian: 107. lovački avijacijski puk / 107. ловачки авијацијски пук) and in 1957, it was reequipped with the American-built F-47D Thunderbolt. This resulted in yet another name change, when it became the 107th Fighter-Bomber Aviation Regiment (Serbo-Croatian: 107. lovačko-bombarderski avijacijski puk / 107. ловачко-бомбардерски авијацијски пук). The P-47 remained in service with the regiment until 1960.

On August 18, 1960, the regiment was converted into the 107th Helicopter Regiment (Serbo-Croatian: 107. helikopterski puk / 107. хеликоптерски пук). It was equipped with Soviet-made Mil Mi-4 and British Westland S-55 helicopters. In 1961, with the "Drvar" re-organization of the Air Force, a new system was put in use to identify squadrons, and the three squadrons of the 107th Helicopter Regiment became the 780th, the 781st and the 782nd Transport Helicopter Squadron.

In 1964, the 677th Transport Aviation Squadron was attached to the regiment, equipped with Douglas C-47 Skytrain and Lisunov Li-3 cargo aircraft. The following year, the 891st Liaison Aviation Squadron with Yugoslav-made Ikarus Kurir monoplanes was also attached to the regiment. In 1966, the 783rd Helicopter Squadron was also assigned to the 107th Regiment. Other organizational changes included the 780th and 781st Transport Helicopter Squadron being reassigned to the 111th Support Aviation Regiment, and the 782nd Transport Helicopter Squadron being reassigned to the 81st Support Aviation Regiment. Both Mi-4 and S-55 helicopters remained in service until 1973. During the period 1964 to 1973, the regiment was known as the 107th Support Aviation Regiment.

By 1973, the regiment was once again converted into a helicopter regiment and was transferred to Mostar Airport, becoming part of the Military Aviation Academy with its main task being helicopter training. It was originally equipped with Soviet-made Mil Mi-2 helicopters, which were replaced in 1974 with Yugoslav-built Soko SA.341 Gazelle helicopters. The regiment then consisted of the 782nd and the 783rd Helicopter Squadrons. In 1988, the 783rd Helicopter Squadron was renumbered as the 722nd Anti-Armored Helicopter Squadron, being equipped with the new Soko SA.342 Gazelle Gama anti-tank helicopter. In the same year, the 334th Fighter-Bomber Aviation Squadron was attached to the 107th Regiment. In 1990, the 334th Fighter-Bomber Aviation Squadron was disbanded.

The regiment was again renamed in 1991 as the 107th Mixed Aviation Regiment. It was used in combat operations in 1991 and 1992 during the wars in Croatia and Bosnia and Herzegovina. With the withdrawal of Yugoslav People's Army units from Bosnia and Herzegovina, the regiment moved in April 1992 from Mostar Airport to Golubovci Air Base in Montenegro.

The regiment was disbanded in May 1992, with most of the regiment's equipment and personnel being transferred to the 722nd Squadron within the 97th Helicopter Regiment.

The commanders of regiment in this period were Dimitrije Kovačević, Ljubo Vukčević, Slobodan Alagić, Radovan Daković, Miloš Bogdanović, Vojislav Mikić, Nikola Petrović, Vukadin Živković, Stevan Vukmanović, Života Pavković and Ivan Mihajlović.

== Assignments ==
- 42nd Aviation Assault Division (1945)
- 11th Aviation Fighter Division (1945)
- 2nd Aviation Assault Division (1945–1948)
- 29th Aviation Division (1948–1959)
- 3rd Air Command (1959–1964)
- 1st Aviation Corps (1964–1973)
- Military Aviation Academy (1973–1991)

== Previous designations ==
- 421st Assault Aviation Regiment (1944–1948)
- 107th Assault Aviation Regiment (1948–1953)
- 107th Fighter Aviation Regiment (1953–1957)
- 107th Fighter-Bomber Aviation Regiment (1957–1960)
- 107th Helicopter Regiment (1960–1964)
- 107th Support Aviation Regiment (1964–1973)
- 107th Helicopter Regiment (1973–1988)
- 107th Aviation Regiment (1988–1990)
- 107th Mixed Aviation Regiment (1991–1992)

== Organization ==
=== 1961–1964 ===
- 107th Helicopter Regiment
  - 780th Transport Helicopter Squadron
  - 781st Transport Helicopter Squadron
  - 782nd Transport Helicopter Squadron

=== 1964–1973 ===
- 107th Support Aviation Regiment
  - 677th Transport Aviation Squadron
  - 891st Liaison Aviation Squadron (1965–1968)
  - 781st Transport Helicopter Squadron
  - 783rd Helicopter Squadron (1966)

=== 1973–1988 ===
- 107th Helicopter Regiment
  - 782nd Transport Helicopter Squadron
  - 783rd Helicopter Squadron
  - 3rd Fighter-Bomber Aviation Squadron of 107th Helicopter Regiment (1978-1979)

=== 1988–1990 ===
- 107th Aviation Regiment
  - 334th Fighter-Bomber Aviation Squadron
  - 245th Fighter-Bomber Aviation Squadron (1988)
  - 722nd Anti-Armored Helicopter Squadron
  - 782nd Helicopter Squadron

=== 1991–1992 ===
- 107th Mixed Aviation Regiment
  - 722nd Anti-Armored Helicopter Squadron
  - 782nd Helicopter Squadron

== Bases stationed ==
- Laćarak (1944)
- Krnješevci (1944)
- Zemun (1944)
- Nadalj (1944)
- Bački Brestovac (1944)
- Sombor (1944)
- Laćarak (1945)
- Skopje (1945)
- Niš (1945–1949)
- Leskovac (1949–1953)
- Niš (1953–1973)
- Mostar (1973–1992)
- Golubovci (1992)

== Commanding officers ==
Date appointed	Name
	Dušan Božović
	Dimitrije Kovačević
	Ljubo Vukčević
	Slobodan Alagić
	Radovan Daković
	Miloš Bogdanović
	Vojislav Mikić
	Nikola Petrović
	Vukadin Živković
	Stevan Vukmanović
	Života Pavković
	Ivan Mihajlović

== Equipment ==
Ilyushin Il-2(1944–1953)
Ikarus S-49A(1953-1957)
F-47D Thunderbolt(1957-1960)
Mil Mi-4(1960-1973)
Westland (SOKO) S-55(1960-1973)
Lisunov Li-3(1964-1973)
Douglas C-47 Skytrain(1964-1973)
Ikarus Kurir(1965-1969)
Mil Mi-2(1973-1974)
Soko SA.341 Gazelle/SA.342 Gama(1974-1992)
Soko G-2 Galeb(1988-1990)
│
1944
│
1949
│
1954
│
1959
│
1964
│
1969
│
1974
│
1979
│
1984
│
1989
│
1994
│
1999
│
2004
│
2009
│
2014
Aircraft In Service With The 107th Mixed Aviation Regiment 1944-92
