= Training Squadron of 39th Aviation Division =

Training Squadron of 39th Aviation Division Trenažna eskadrila 39. vazduhoplovne divizije
- Active: 1953 – 1959
- Disbanded: 1959
- Country: Yugoslavia
- Branch: Yugoslav Air Force
- Type: Squadron
- Role: Training
- Part of: 39th Aviation Division
- Garrison/HQ: Skopski Petrovac

The Training Squadron of 39th Aviation Division (Serbo-Croatian: Trenažna eskadrila 39. vazduhoplovne divizije / Тренажна ескадрила 39. ваздухопловне дивизије) was an aviation squadron of Yugoslav Air Force formed in 1953 at Skopski Petrovac airfield.

Squadron was part of 39th Aviation Division. It was equipped with US-made F-47D Thunderbolt fighter-bombers, Soviet Yak-9U trainer-fighters, Yugoslav-made Ikarus S-49C fighters and Aero-2 trainers, and other aircraft.

It was disbanded in 1959 due to the Drvar reorganization.

== Equipment ==
- F-47D Thunderbolt (1953-1959)
- Yakovlev Yak-9U (1953-1959)
- Ikarus S-49C (1953-1959)
- Ikarus Aero 2B/C (1953-1959)
