= 122nd Fighter Aviation Squadron =

122nd Fighter Aviation Squadron: 122. lovačka avijacijska eskadrila
- Active: 1961 – 1964
- Disbanded: 1964
- Country: Yugoslavia
- Branch: Yugoslav Air Force
- Type: Squadron
- Role: Fighter
- Part of: 94th Fighter Aviation Regiment
- Garrison/HQ: Skopski Petrovac

The 122nd Fighter Aviation Squadron (Serbo-Croatian: 122. lovačka avijacijska eskadrila / 122. ловачка авијацијска ескадрила) was an aviation squadron of Yugoslav Air Force established in April 1961 as part of 94th Fighter Aviation Regiment at Skopski Petrovac military airport.

It was equipped with US-made North American F-86E Sabre jet fighter aircraft.

By the end of 1964 the 83rd Fighter Aviation Regiment has been disbanded per the "Drvar 2" reorganization plan. The 122nd Fighter Aviation Squadron was also disbanded. Its personnel and equipment were attached to 123rd Fighter Aviation Squadron.

== Assignments ==
- 94th Fighter Aviation Regiment (1961–1964)

== Bases stationed ==
- Skopski Petrovac (1961–1964)

== Equipment ==
- North American F-86E Sabre (1961–1964)
