= 7th Aviation Corps =

Yugoslav aviation corps

7th Aviation Corps: 7. avijacijski korpus
- Active: 1953–1959
- Disbanded: 1959
- Country: Yugoslavia
- Branch: Yugoslav Air Force
- Type: Regiment
- HQ: Zemun

The 7th Aviation Corps (Serbo-Croatian: 7. avijacijski korpus / 7. авијацијски корпус) was an aviation corps established in 1953. It was formed by order from February 5, 1953, with command in Zemun as join unit composed from three aviation divisions and one aviation technical division. Corps was disbanded by order from June 27, 1959, with the "Drvar" reorganization of the Air Force.

== Organization ==
    - Liaison Squadron of 7th Aviation Corps
    - 112th Signal Battalion
  - 103rd Reconnaissance Aviation Regiment
  - 211th Air Reconnaissance Regiment (1955–1959)
- 29th Aviation Division
- 39th Aviation Division
- 44th Aviation Division
- 48th Aviation Technical Division

== Commanding officers ==
- Božo Lazarević

=== Political Commissars ===
- Nenad Drakulić

=== Chiefs of Staff ===
- Ljubomir Popadić
- Vladimir Bakarić
