= 13th Air Defense Division =

13th Air Defense Division: 13. divizija protivvazdušne odbrane
- Active: 1968–1972
- Disbanded: 1973
- Country: Yugoslavia
- Branch: Yugoslav Air Force
- Type: Division
- Size: 1 regiments
- HQ: Skoplje

The 13th Air Defense Division (Serbo-Croatian: 13. divizija protivvazdušne odbrane/ 13. дивизија противваздушне одбране) was an air defense division established in 1968.

== History ==
The 13th Air Defense Division was formed on January 20, 1968. The divisions command was first at Skoplje. It has failed to develop into a unit volume of other air defense divisions. It has been disbanded by order from September 14, 1972.

== Assignments ==
- Command of Yugoslav Air Force
- 1st Aviation Corps

== Organization ==
- 83rd Fighter Aviation Regiment

== Commanding officers ==
- Ismet Kulenović
