= 3rd Air Reconnaissance Regiment =

3rd Air Reconnaissance Regiment: 3. puk VOJIN
- Active: 1968 - 1973; 1986 - 1992
- Disbanded: 1973; 1992
- Country: Yugoslavia
- Branch: Yugoslav Air Force
- Part of: 3rd Corps of Air Force and Air Defense
- Command: Sarajevo; Niš

The 3rd Air Reconnaissance Regiment (Serbo-Croatian: 3. puk VOJIN / 3. пук ВОЈИН) was an air reconnaissance and guidance regiment established in 1968 and reestablished as part of the SFR Yugoslav Air Force.

== History ==
The 3rd Air Reconnaissance Regiment was established on June 3, 1968, from 68th Air Reconnaissance Battalion with command located at Skoplje. It was disbanded by military order from September 14, 1972, and in 1973 it was re-formed 31st Air Reconnaissance Battalion.

The regiment was reestablished by military order on February 28, 1986, made up of elements from the 31st Air Reconnaissance Battalion and other smaller units with headquarters located at Niš. It was disbanded in June 1992 and its units have since become part of 126th Air Reconnaissance Brigade.

== Assignments ==
- 13th Air Defense Division (1968–1973)
- 3rd Corps of Air Force and Air Defense (1986–1992)

== Commanding officers ==
- Gojko Petrović
- Milenko Pejakov
- Slavoljub Drenjanin
- Veselin Savić.
