= Yakovlev Yak-9 =

Fighter aircraft

Yak-9
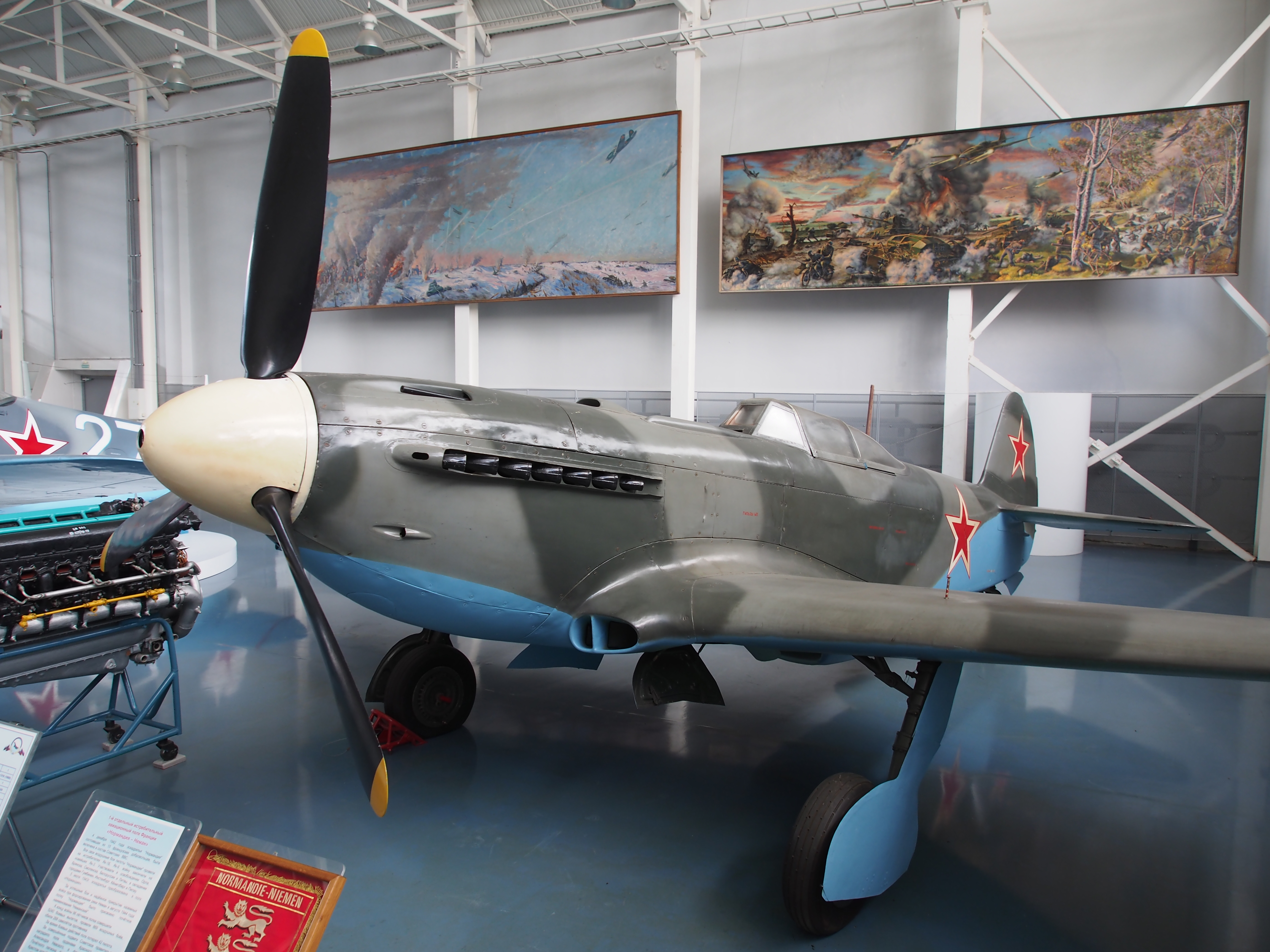
- Yak-9, at the Central Air Force Museum, Monino

General information
- Type: Fighter
- National origin: Soviet Union
- Designer: A.S. Yakovlev Design Bureau
- Built by: Plant No.153 (Novosibirsk), Plant No.166 (Omsk), Plant No.82 (Moscow)
- Primary users: Soviet Air Forces: French Air Force (Normandie-Niemen); Polish Air Force; Yugoslav Air Force
- Number built: 16,769

History
- Manufactured: October 1942 – December 1948
- Introduction date: October 1942
- First flight: 6 July 1942 (Yak-7DI)
- Retired: 1950 (Soviet Air Forces), 1951 (Korean People's Army Air and Anti-Air Force), 1955 (Bulgarian Air Force)
- Developed from: Yakovlev Yak-7

The Yakovlev Yak-9 (Russian: Яковлев Як-9; NATO reporting name: Frank) is a single-engined, single-seat, multipurpose, fighter aircraft used by the Soviet Union and its allies during World War II and the early Cold War. It was a development of the robust and successful Yak-7B fighter, which was based, in turn, on the tandem-seat, advanced trainer known as the Yak-7UTI. The Yak-9 started arriving in Soviet fighter regiments in late 1942 and played a major role in retaking air superiority from the Luftwaffe's new Focke-Wulf Fw 190 and Messerschmitt Bf 109 fighters during the Battle of Kursk in summer 1943.

The Yak-9 had a cut-down rear fuselage with an unobscured canopy. Its lighter metal structure allowed for an increased fuel load and armament over previous models built from wood. The Yak-9 was manoeuvrable at high speeds when flying at low to medium altitudes and was also easy to control, qualities that allowed it to be one of the most produced Soviet fighters of World War II. It was produced in different variants, including the Yak-9T with the 37 mm (1.5 in) cannon and the "large-calibre" Yak-9K with a 45 mm (1.77 in) cannon firing through the propeller hub, which were used for antitank duty and as potent aircraft destroyers, the fighter-bomber Yak-9B with an internal bomb bay behind the cockpit for up to 400 kg (880 lb) of bombs, the long-range Yak-9D and -9DD with additional wing fuel tanks to escort bombers over Eastern Europe, and the Yak-9U with a more powerful engine and improved aerodynamics. The Yak-9 remained in production from 1942 to 1948, with 16,769 built (14,579 during the war).

After World War II, the Yak-9 also was used by the North Korean Air Force during the Korean War.

== Design and development ==
The Yak-9 represented further development of the successful Yakovlev Yak-7 fighter, a production version of the lightened Yak-7DI, taking full advantage of the combat experience with its predecessor. Greater availability of duralumin allowed for lighter construction, which in turn permitted a number of modifications to the basic design. Yak-9 variants used two different wings, five different engines, six different fuel-tank configurations, and seven different armament configurations.

=== Yak-9U ===
During December 1943, the new airframe (Yak-9U) was able to use the M-107A engine, which was more powerful than the previous VK-105PF. The engine installation was new and included individual faired exhaust pipes. The oil-cooler intake was moved from beneath the nose to the port wing root, and the radiator bath was enlarged and moved further aft below the fuselage. The supercharger intake was centered on the top decking of the engine cowling. The rear antenna cable was moved inside a lengthened rear canopy, improving the pilot's view to the rear, while the rear fuselage was cut down and the horizontal tail surfaces were slightly reduced in size. The wings and fuselage structure were made of metal, which was then skinned with Bakelite. The Yak-9U was typically armed with a 20 mm (0.79 in) ShVAK cannon firing through the hollow propeller shaft, and two 12.7 mm (0.50 in) Berezin UB machine guns.

State trials carried out from January to April 1944 revealed that the Yak-9U had a better top speed compared to fighters in service on the Eastern front at 6,000 m (20,000 ft). Unlike the I-185, the Yak-9U was stable and easy to fly. However, the M-107A engine inherited the problems of the VK-105PF and was prone to overheating, oil leaks, loss of engine pressure during climbs, spark plugs constantly burning out, and intense vibrations, which would fatigue assembly bolts, leading to a short engine life. These defects forced the first production batches starting during April 1944 to be powered by the more reliable M-105 PF-3 engine. Further changes were made, such as increasing the fuel capacity to 400 L (88 imp gal; 110 US gal), moving the wings 9.9 cm (3.9 in) forward to rebalance the aircraft, and replacing the aircraft's VIsh-107LO propeller with the older VIsh-105S. In total, 1,134 aircraft were constructed by December 1944.

== Operational history ==
=== Second World War ===
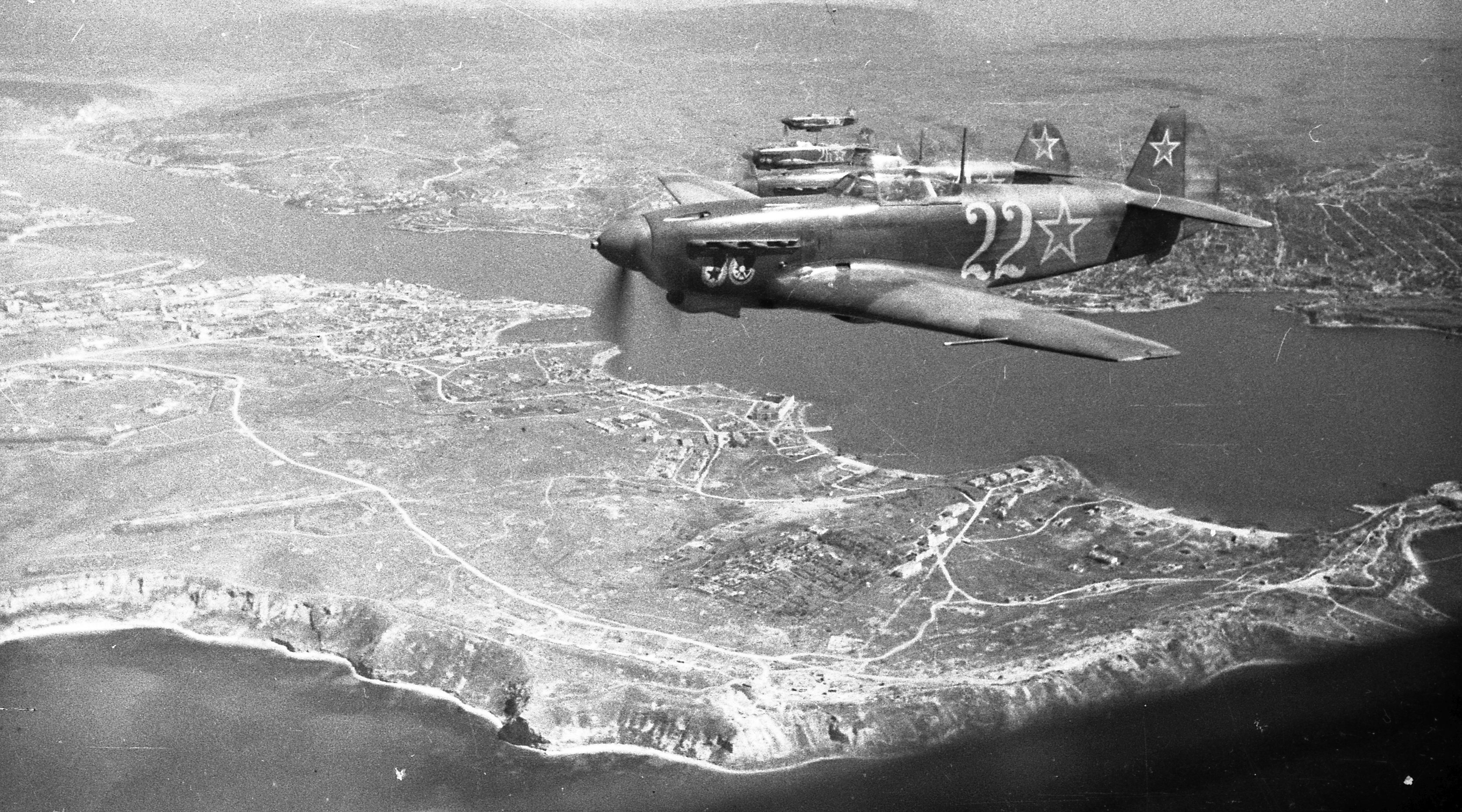
Yak-9Ds of the 6th Guards Fighter Aviation Regiment of the Air Force of the Black Sea Fleet over Sevastopol, May 1944

The first Yak-9 entered service in October 1942 and saw combat the same year. It operated with a wide variety of armament for use in antitank, light bomber, and long-range escort roles. At low altitude, in which it operated predominantly, the Yak-9 was more maneuverable than the Bf 109. A series of improvements in performance and armament did not degrade the handling characteristics. Soviet pilots regarded the Yak-9's performance as being comparable to the Bf 109G and Fw 190A-3/A-4. At the beginning of the German invasion of the Soviet Union, though, Yak-9s performed poorly against the Luftwaffe because of a lack of training, although by the Battle of Stalingrad, they began to perform better. After the Battle of Smolensk in the second half of 1943, the famed Free French Normandie-Niémen unit became a Groupe and was equipped with the Yak-9.

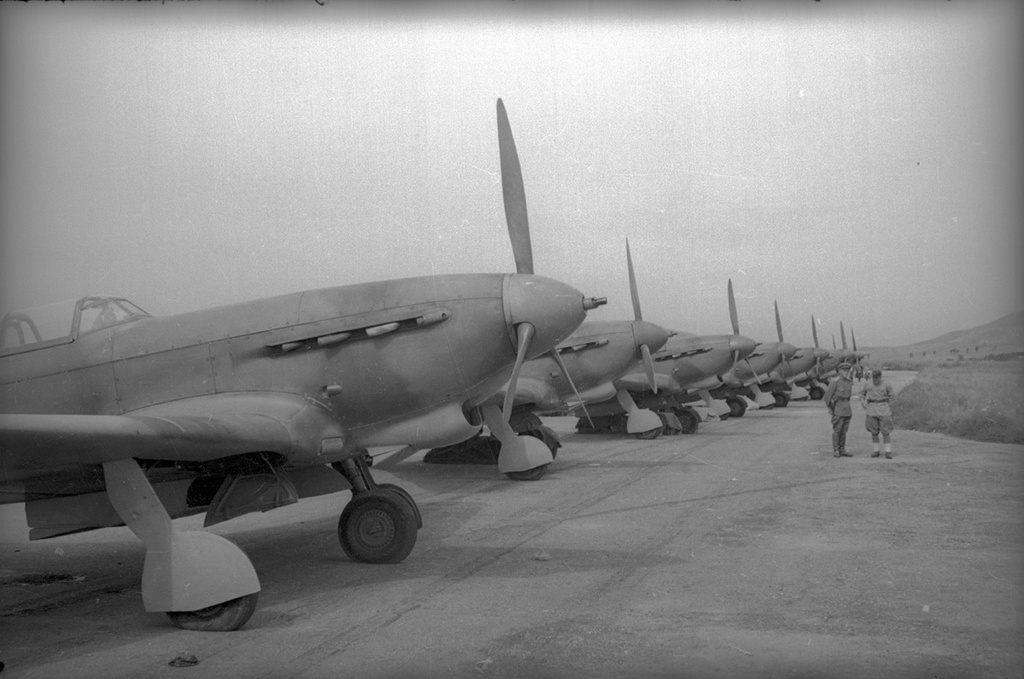
A row of parked Yak-9Ts after the Soviet invasion of Manchuria, Port Arthur, China, September 1945

The first unit to use the Yak-9U, between 25 October and 25 December 1944, was 163.IAP. Pilots were ordered not to use the engine at combat speed, since this reduced its life to two or three flights only. Nevertheless, in the course of 398 sorties, the unit claimed 27 Focke-Wulf Fw 190As and one Bf 109G-2, for the loss of two Yaks in dogfights, one to flak and four in accidents. The Yak-9U contributed greatly toward the Soviets gaining air superiority, and the Germans learned to avoid the Yaks "without antenna mast".

A large formation of the Yak-9DD version was transferred to Bari (the capital of Apulia, in Italy) to help Yugoslav partisans in the Balkans.

One of the top-scoring Yak-9 pilots was First Lieutenant A.I. Vybornov. Flying a type-T (equipped with a 37mm NS-37 cannon in the nose), he achieved 19 air victories, plus nine shared, and was awarded the Gold Star Medal of the Hero of the Soviet Union in June 1945. At the end of the war, on 22 March 1945, Lieutenant L.I. Sivko from 812th IAP achieved an air victory against a Messerschmitt Me 262 jet fighter, but he was killed soon afterward by another Me 262, probably piloted by Franz Schall, a top-scoring Me 262 pilot.

Fighter units with this aircraft suffered lower losses than average. Of 2,550 Yak-9s manufactured by the end of 1943, only 383 were lost in combat.

=== 1945 – 1949 ===
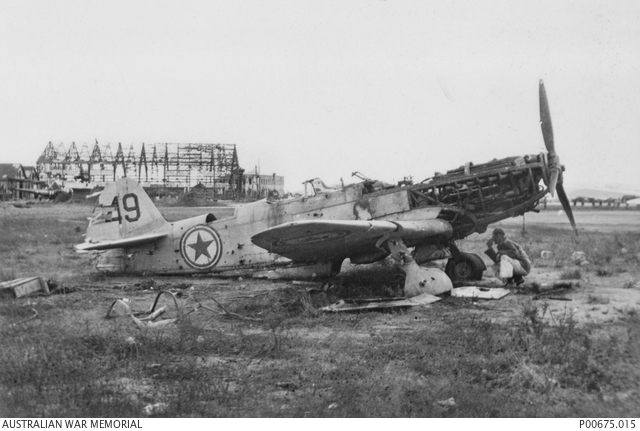
A damaged North Korean Yak-9P at Kimpo Air Base, September 1950

At the beginning of the Cold War, Yak-9 fighters began buzzing American, British, and French flights in the air corridors to West Berlin. During the Berlin Blockade, Yak-9 fighters interfered with the U.S. Air Force-Royal Air Force airlift.

During 1949, the Soviet Union provided surplus Yak-9P (VK-107) aircraft to some satellite states in the Soviet bloc to help them rebuild their air forces following the West Berlin blockade. A section of the aircraft's operating manual was accidentally omitted from the translation from Russian into some languages; before starting the Yak-9, hand-cranking a small, cockpit-mounted oil pump 25 times was necessary to provide initial lubrication to the Klimov V12 engine, unlike World War II German and Western fighters equipped with forced, closed-cycle lubrication systems. Skipping this unusual but vital step resulted in frequent engine seizures during the takeoff roll and initial climb, causing several fatalities during 1950.

=== Korean War ===
In 1949, the Soviet Union provided the Korean People's Army Air Force with 42 Yak-9P, 12 older Yak-9, and 9 Yak-9V trainers. Due to attrition caused by the inexperienced North Korean pilots, the Soviets sent around 25 additional Yak-9s, six of them the two-seater trainers, in early 1950. At the start of the Korean War, the North Korean Air Force had 79 Yak-9s.

== Variants ==
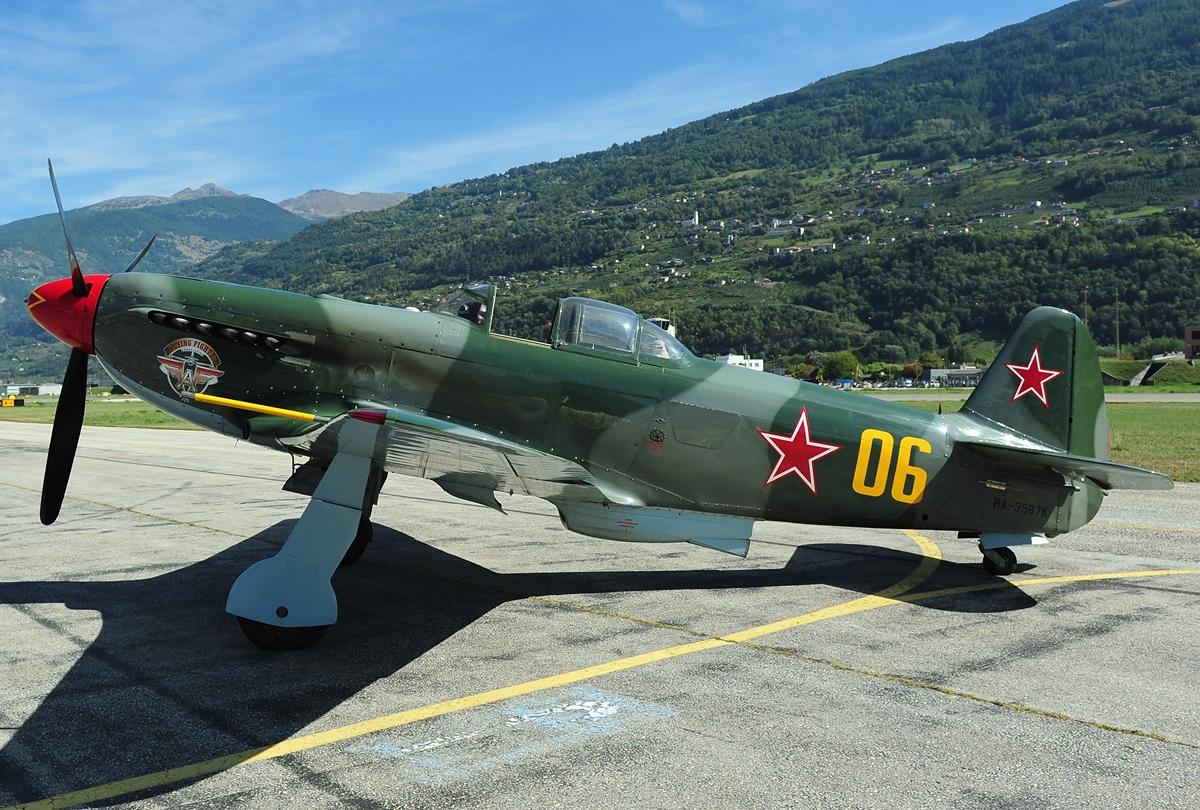
Private Yak-9U

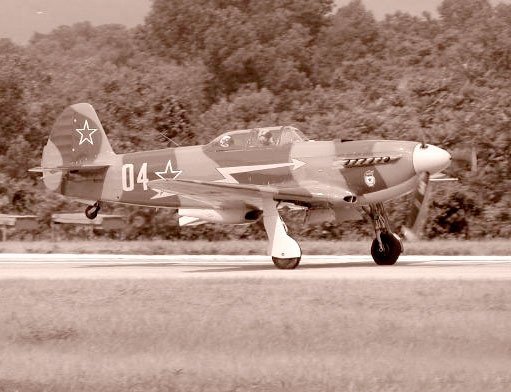
Reproduction Yak-9 on takeoff at a World War II air show in Reading, Pennsylvania

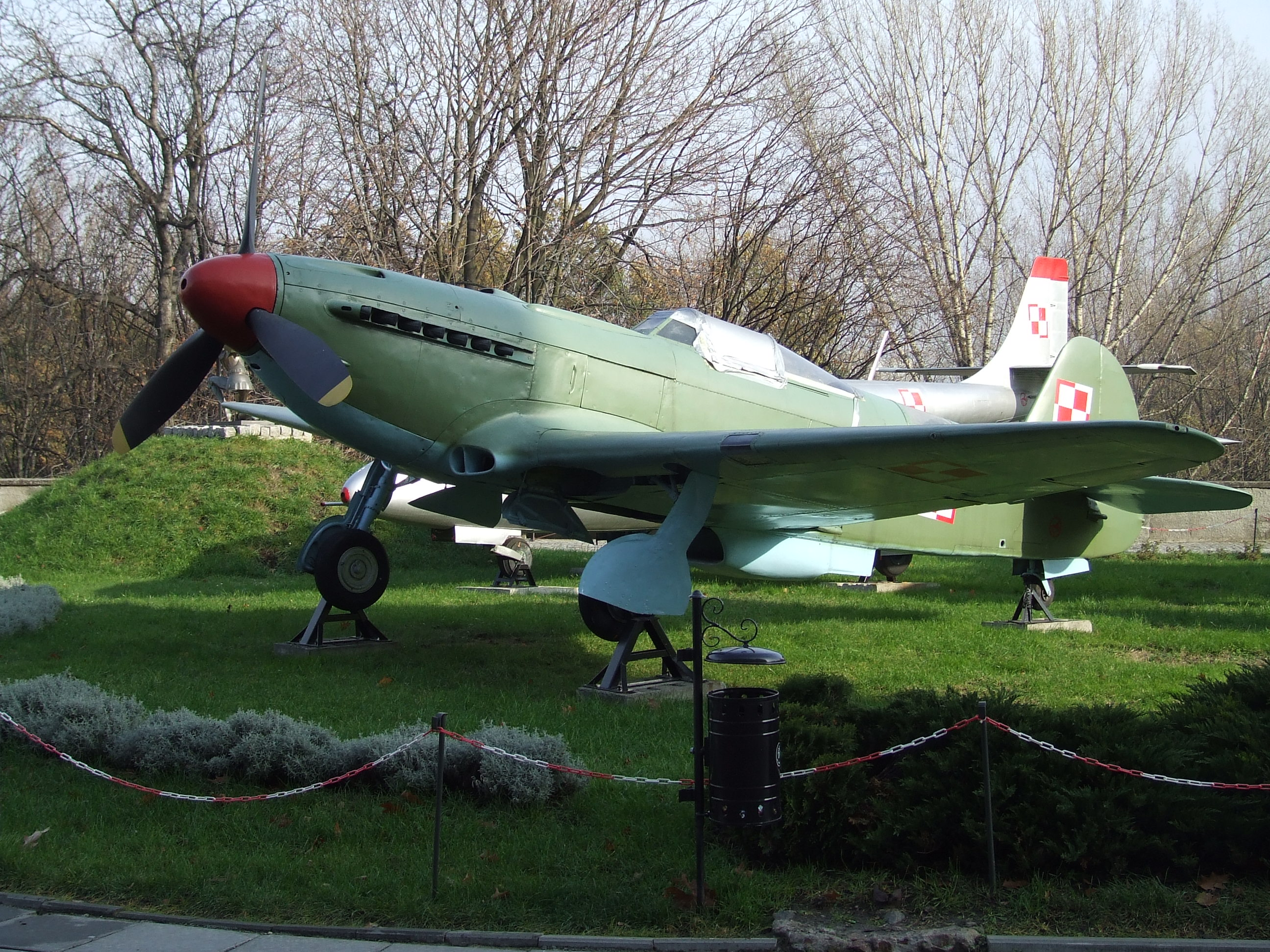
Yak-9 with Polish markings

Yakovlev OKB created 22 modifications of the Yak-9, of which 15 saw mass production. The most notable of these include:

Yak-9

The first production version, with a Klimov M-105PF engine with 930 kW (1,250 hp), 1 × 20 mm (0.79 in) ShVAK cannon with 120 rounds, and 1 × 12.7 mm (0.50 in) UBS machine gun with 200 rounds.

Yak-9 (M-106)

A prototype with the Klimov M-106-1SK engine with 1,007 kW (1,350 hp). It did not advance to production because of problems with the engine.

Yak-9T

A Yak-9 armed with a 37 mm (1.5 in) Nudelman-Suranov NS-37 cannon with 30 rounds instead of the 20 mm (0.79 in) ShVAK. The cockpit was moved 0.4 m (1 ft 4 in) back to compensate for the heavier nose. A problem corrected during prototype tests was poor quality control that led to multiple oil and coolant leaks from cannon recoil. Recoil and a limited supply of ammunition required accurate aiming and two- or three-round bursts. The Yak-9T was widely used against enemy shipping on the Black Sea and against tanks – the cannon could penetrate up to 40 mm (1.6 in) armor from 500 m (1,600 ft) – but was also successful against aircraft: a single cannon hit was usually sufficient to tear apart the target. Virage (constant altitude and speed turn) time was 18–19 seconds. 2748 were produced.

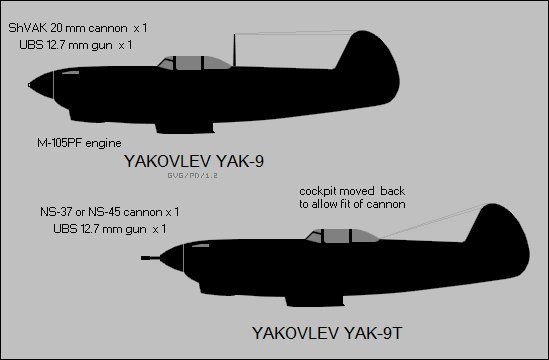
Yak-9T silhouette compared to an early variant

Yak-9K

A Yak-9T modification, it had a 45 mm (1.8 in) NS-45 cannon with 29 rounds and a distinctive muzzle brake to deal with the massive recoil. Firing the cannon at speeds below 350 km/h (220 mph) caused a dramatic loss of control and tossed the pilot back and forth in the cockpit, but accurate shooting was possible at higher speeds and in two- to three-round bursts. The recoil also caused numerous oil and coolant leaks. The heavy cannon decreased performance dramatically, especially at high altitudes, to the point that Yak-9Ks were relegated to heavy fighter duty and had to be escorted by Yak-3s. The Yak-9K saw only limited use due to the unreliability of the NS-45 and to airframe performance issues caused by the NS-45 and by the larger fuel tanks used on the Yak-9K; it also saw little use because of a reduced number of German bombers.

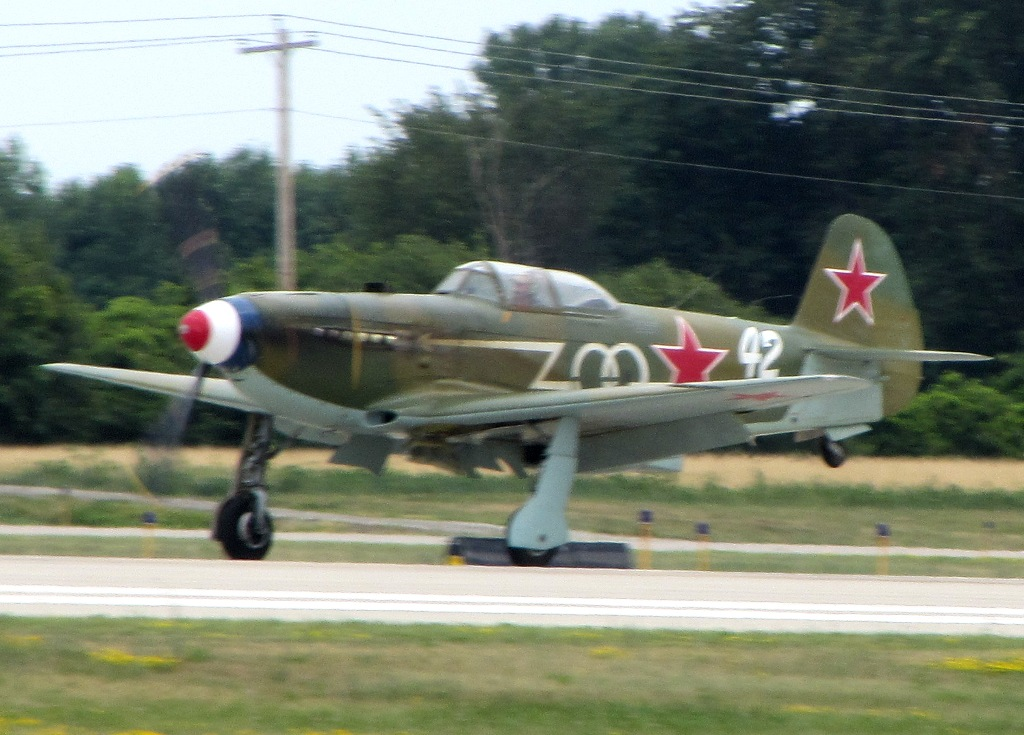
Yak-9 racer

Yak-9D

A long-range version of the Yak-9, it had its fuel capacity increased from 440 to 650 L (97 to 143 imp gal; 120 to 170 US gal), giving a maximum range of 1,400 km (870 mi). Its combat usefulness at full range was limited by a lack of radio navigation equipment, and a number of aircraft were used as short-range fighters with fuel carried only in inner wing tanks. The time to complete a circle was 19–20 seconds. The weight of fire was 2 kg/s (260 lb/min).

Yak-9TD

A Yak-9D with an NS-37 cannon and provision for 4 × 50 kg (110 lb) FAB-50 bombs under the wings.

Yak-9B

A fighter-bomber version of the Yak-9D (factory designation Yak-9L), it had four vertical-tube bomb bays (in a 2×2 arrangement) aft of the cockpit with capacity for up to 4 × 100 kg (220 lb) FAB-100 bombs or 4 PTAB cassettes with 32 × 1.5 kg (3.3 lb) bomblets each, although normally only 200 kg (440 lb) of weapons were carried in the front bomb bays. The Yak-9B was put into limited production but did not prove successful enough to be put into wide-scale production. Difficulties in loading bombs, poor handling with a full bomb and fuel load and lack of bombsight or other aiming equipment limited its combat usefulness.

Yak-9DD

A Yak-9D or Yak-9T modified for longer range by a larger fuel capacity of 845 L (186 imp gal; 223 US gal) which increased the maximum range to 2,285 kilometres (1,420 mi). Radio navigation equipment for night and poor weather flying was added. The Yak-9DD was used primarily to escort Petlyakov Pe-2 and Tupolev Tu-2 bombers although it proved less than ideal for this role due to an insufficient speed advantage over the bombers. In 1944, several Yak-9DD fighters were used to escort B-17 Flying Fortress and B-24 Liberator bombers attacking targets in Romania using the Ukraine-Romania-Italy routes.

Yak-9M

A Yak-9D with the cockpit moved 0.4 m (1 ft 4 in) to the rear like the Yak-9T, as well as numerous fixes and improvements based on experience with previous versions.

Yak-9M PVO

A Yak-9M with slightly reduced fuel capacity, the Klimov VK-105PF2 engine with 970 kW (1,300 hp), and radio and navigational equipment for night and adverse weather flying for PVO Strany.

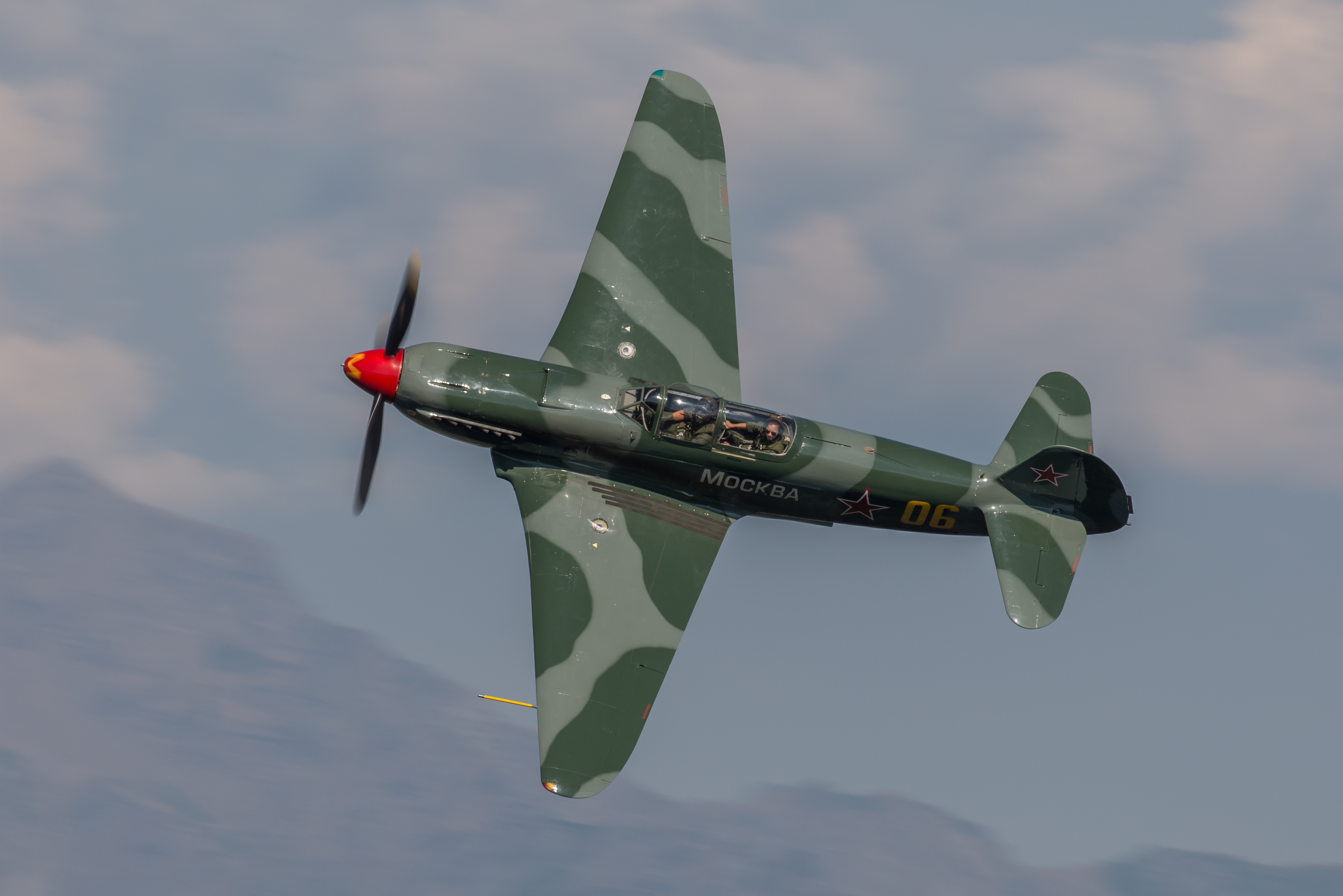
HB-RYA flying next to Pierre Avois, VS, Switzerland

Yak-9 MPVO

A single-seat night fighter aircraft, equipped with a searchlight and an RPK-10 radio compass.

Yak-9S

A Yak-9M with a Klimov VK-105PF engine, a new propeller, and armament consisting of 1 × 23 mm (0.91 in) Nudelman-Suranov NS-23 cannon with 60 rounds, and 2 × 20 mm (0.79 in) Berezin B-20 cannons with 120 rounds. It did not enter production due to its poor performance compared to the Yak-3 and Yak-9U.

Yak-9R

A single-seat tactical reconnaissance aircraft.

Yak-9P

This aircraft was the last and the most advanced version of the Yak-9 fighter, which became the pinnacle of development among A. S. Yakovlev's piston-engined fighters. The Yak-9P (Product P) that appeared in 1946 was a modification of the Yak-9U fighter of composite construction. Unlike its predecessor, it had all-metal wings with elliptical tips. By this time, the manufacture of high-strength aluminum alloys was established in the Soviet Union, simplifying aircraft operation and increasing aircraft service life.

Yak-9P (VK-107)

A Yak-9U with an all-metal wing. "Yak-9P" in this case was a factory designation different from the Yak-9P with two ShVAKs described above.

Yak-9PD

A high-altitude interceptor (unrelated to the two other Yak-9P variants described above) with the Klimov M-105PD engine, designed specifically to intercept Luftwaffe Junkers Ju 86P high-altitude reconnaissance aircraft overflying Moscow in 1942–1943. Poor performance due to the unreliable engine dramatically improved with adoption of the Klimov M-106PV with water injection, with the aircraft reaching 12,500 m (41,000 ft) during testing. The armament was reduced to the ShVAK cannon only to save weight.

Yak-9U (VK-105)

A Yak-9T with the Klimov VK-105PF2 engine and numerous aerodynamic and structural improvements introduced with the Yak-3. The main visual difference from the Yak-9T was in the oil coolers in the wing roots, like on the Yak-3, and in that plywood covered the fuselage, instead of fabric. It differed visually from the Yak-3 only by the main landing gear covers. The armament increased to 1 × 23 mm (0.91 in) VYa cannon with 60 rounds and 2 × 12.7 mm (0.50 in) UBSs with 170 rounds each. The VYa cannon could be replaced by a ShVAK, B-20, or NS-37, the latter requiring removal of the starboard UBS machine gun. It did not enter production because the VYa was considered unsatisfactory and because the one cannon, one machine gun armament seen on previous models offered a significant increase in range.

Yak-9U (VK-107)

The definitive Yak-9 variant, the Yak-9U (VK-105) was equipped with the new 1,230 kW (1,650 hp) Klimov VK-107A engine, and with the 20 mm (0.79 in) ShVAK with 120 rounds replacing the VYa cannon. The weight of fire was 2.72 kg/s (6.0 lb/s). Early test flights in 1943 indicated that the only comparable Soviet fighter was the Polikarpov I-185 prototype which was more difficult to fly and less agile due to higher weight. The prototype's top speed of 700 km/h (430 mph) at 5,600 m (18,400 ft) was second among production fighter aircraft in the world at the time only to the Mustang P-51B's 710 km/h (441 mph) achieved on military power. Early problems with overheating were fixed by enlarging the radiators and production aircraft had further improved aerodynamics. The time to complete a circle was 23 seconds. It was the best Soviet fighter at high altitude.

Yak-9UV

A two-seat trainer version of the Yak-9U (VK-107) with armament reduced to a single Berezin B-20 cannon with 100 rounds. It did not enter production due to the introduction of jet aircraft.

Yak-9UT

A Yak-9U (VK-107) armed with 1 × 37 mm (1.5 in) Nudelman N-37 cannon with 30 rounds and 2 x 20 mm (0.79 in) Berezin B-20 cannons with 120 rounds each, giving a total one-second burst mass of 6 kg (13 lb). Similarly to the Yak-9TK, it could be converted to replace the N-37 with a 20 mm (0.79 in) B-20, 23 mm (0.91 in) NS-23, or 45 mm (1.8 in) N-45. Production aircraft carried the NS-23 instead of the N-37 cannon as the default armament.

Yak-9-57

The Yak-9-57 was a one-off conversion of a Yak-9UT armed with a 57 mm cannon. The large caliber cannon did not protrude from the spinner cone like the Yak-9-37/45 models.

Yak-9V

A two-seat trainer version of Yak-9M and Yak-9T with the Klimov VK-105PF2 engine and with armament reduced to 1 × 20 mm (0.79 in) ShVAK with 90 rounds.

Modern replicas

In the early 1990s, Yakovlev started limited production for the warbird market of Yak-9 and Yak-3 replica aircraft using original World War II equipment and Allison V-1710 engines. These modern-built replicas using the Allison engines have counterclockwise-rotation props, unlike the originals, which strictly used clockwise-rotation Soviet V12 powerplants.

== Operators ==
Albania

- Albanian Air Force received 72 aircraft in 1947, including 12 Yak-9V trainers. As of 2026, Yak-9 is retired from Albanian Air Force.

Bulgaria

- Bulgarian Air Force

China

- People's Liberation Army Air Force

France

- French Air Force (Armée de l'Air)
  - Normandie-Niemen squadron

Hungary

- Hungarian Air Force received aircraft in 1949. The type's Hungarian name was "Vércse" (Kestrel).

Mongolia

- Mongolian Air Force received 34 aircraft in late June 1945.

North Korea

- North Korean Air Force

Poland

- Air Force of the Polish Army
- Polish Air Force operated several aircraft from 1947 to 1953.
- Polish Navy

Soviet Union

- Soviet Air Force
- Soviet Air Defence Forces

Yugoslavia

- SFR Yugoslav Air Force – 16 Yak-9T, 40 Yak-9P, 47 Yak-9D/M and 68 Yak-9V aircraft in 1944–1950/1960
  - 111th Fighter Aviation Regiment (1947–1948)
  - 112th Fighter Aviation Regiment (1947–1948)
  - 94th Fighter Aviation Regiment (1948–1952)
  - 116th Fighter Aviation Regiment (1948–1950)
  - 117th Fighter Aviation Regiment (1948–1950)
  - 141st Training Aviation Regiment (1952–1953)
  - 2nd Training Aviation Regiment (1946–1948)
  - 101st Fighter-Training Aviation Regiment (1948–1950)
  - 103rd Reconnaissance Aviation Regiment (1950–1951)
  - 104th Training Aviation Regiment (1948–1950)
  - Training Squadron of 32nd Aviation Division (1953–1959)
  - Training Squadron of 39th Aviation Division (1953–1959)
  - Training Squadron of 44th Aviation Division (1953–1954)

== Surviving aircraft ==
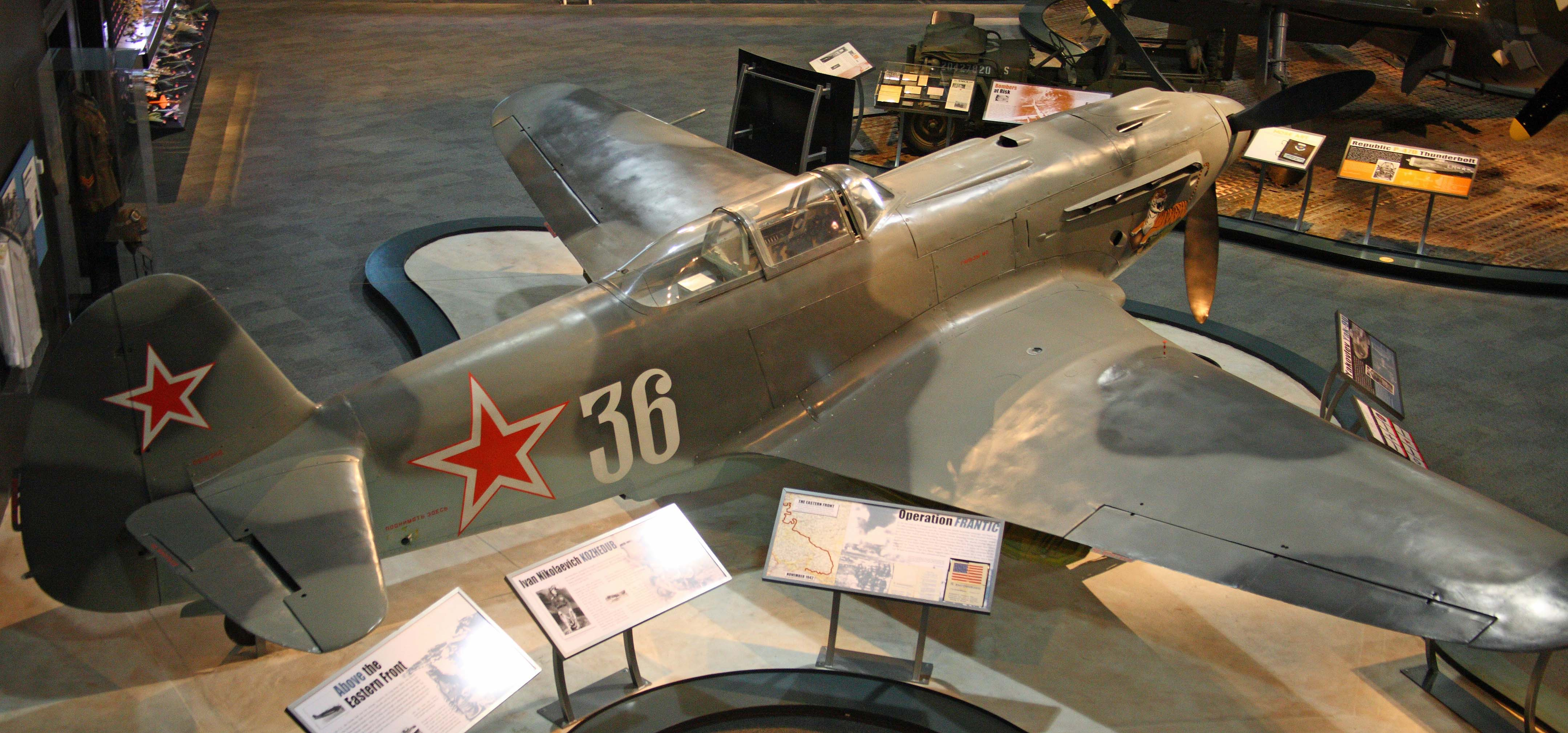
Yak-9 on display at the Museum of Flight

Bulgaria

- Yak-9P on display at the Aviation Museum in Krumovo, Plovdiv. It is tactical number 27.

North Korea

- Yak-9P on display at Victorious War Museum in Pyongyang.

Poland

- Yak-9P on static display at the Museum of the Polish Navy in Gdynia, Pomerania. It is tactical number 2 and was used by the Navy Aviation Escadrille until 1956. On 12 December 1956, it was transferred to the museum on behalf of the Navy Command.
- Yak-9P on static display at the Museum of the Polish Army in Warsaw, Mazovia. It is tactical number 23 and was used by the 1st Fighter Aviation Regiment from 1947 until 1950. It was transferred to the museum on 10 August 1950 on behalf of the Air Force Command.

Russia

- Yak-9U on static display at the Central Air Force Museum in Monino, Moscow Oblast.
- Yak-9 on static display at the Vadim Zadorozhny Museum of Technology in Krasnogorsky District, Moscow Oblast.
- Yak-9 on static display at the Museum of the Air Forces of the Northern Fleet in Safonovo, Murmansk Oblast.

Serbia

- Yak-9P in storage at the Aeronautical Museum Belgrade in Surčin, Belgrade.

Ukraine

- Yak-9 on static display at the National Museum of the History of Ukraine in the Second World War in Kyiv.

United States

- Yak-9U on static display at the Museum of Flight in Seattle, Washington.

== Specifications (Yak-9U) ==
Yak-9P 3-view drawing

Data from

General characteristics

- Crew: 1
- Length: 8.55 m (28 ft 1 in)
- Wingspan: 9.74 m (31 ft 11 in)
- Height: 3.00 m (9 ft 10 in)
- Wing area: 17.15 m^{2} (184.6 sq ft)
- Airfoil: root: Clark YH (14%); tip: Clark YH (10%)
- Empty weight: 2,512 kg (5,538 lb)
- Gross weight: 3,204 kg (7,064 lb)
- Fuel capacity: 355 kg (782.6 lb)
- Powerplant: 1 × Klimov VK-107A V-12 liquid-cooled piston engine, 1,230 kW (1,650 hp)
- Propellers: 3-bladed variable-pitch propeller, 3.00 m (9 ft 10 in) diameter

Performance

- Maximum speed: 690 km/h (430 mph, 370 kn) at 5,900 m (19,400 ft)
- Range: 675 km (419 mi, 364 nmi)
- Service ceiling: 10,850 m (35,600 ft)
- Rate of climb: 18.9 m/s (3,720 ft/min)
- Wing loading: 186.82 kg/m^{2} (38.26 lb/sq ft)
- Power/mass: 0.35 kW/kg (0.21 hp/lb)

Armament

- Guns:

- 1 × 20 mm (0.79 in) ShVAK cannon, 120 rounds
- 2 × 12.7 mm (0.50 in) UBS machine guns, 340 rounds

== See also ==
Related development

- Yak-3
- Yak-11
- Ikarus S-49

Aircraft of comparable role, configuration, and era

- Focke-Wulf Fw 190
- Lavochkin La-5F
- Macchi C.202 Folgore
- Mitsubishi A6M
- Kawasaki Ki-100
- Reggiane Re.2000

Related lists

- List of aircraft of World War II
- List of military aircraft of the Soviet Union and the CIS
- List of fighter aircraft
