= 39th Aviation Division =

39th Aviation Division: 39. vazduhoplovna divizija
- Active: 1947–1959
- Disbanded: 1959
- Country: Yugoslavia
- Branch: Yugoslav Air Force
- Type: Division
- Size: 2-3 regiments
- HQ: Skoplje

The 39th Aviation Division (Serbo-Croatian: 39. vazduhoplovna divizija/ 39. ваздухопловна дивизија) was a unit originally established in 1947 as the 5th Aviation Fighter Division (Serbo-Croatian: 5. vazduhoplovna lovačka divizija / 5. ваздухопловна ловачка дивизија).

== History ==
=== 5th Fighter Aviation Division ===
The 5th Fighter Aviation Division was established in April, 1947, with headquarters at Skoplje, with task of air defense of southern Yugoslavia. The division was direct under the Command of Yugoslav Air Force. It was formed from 111th and 113th Fighter Aviation Regiment.

By the 1948 year this division was renamed like all other units of Yugoslav Army, so it has become 39th Aviation Fighter Division (Serbo-Croatian: 39. vazduhoplovna lovačka divizija/ 39. ваздухопловна ловачка дивизија).

The commanders of division in this period were Petar Radević and Ilija Zelenika. Commissar was Krsto Bosanac.

=== 39th Aviation Division ===
The 39th Aviation Fighter Division was formed by renaming of 5th Aviation Fighter Division in 1948. It suffered small changes in the organization. Division has remain in Skoplje until it was disbanded.

In 1953 division was attached to 7th Aviation Corps. By 1953 it was renamed in to Aviation Fighter-Bomber Division due to the replacement of Soviet fighter aircraft with US-made fighter-bombers.

It was disbanded by the order from June 27, 1959, year due to the "Drvar" reorganization plan. It was transformed into 3rd Air Command.

The commanders of division in this period were Ilija Zelenika, Petar Radević, Nikola Lekić and Ilija Zelenika. Commissars were Krsto Bosanac, Radoje Ljubičić and Aco Babić until 1953.

== Assignments ==
- Command of Yugoslav Air Force (1947–1953)
- 7th Aviation Corps (1953–1959)

== Previous designations ==
- 5th Aviation Fighter Division (1947–1948)
- 39th Aviation Fighter Division (1948–1952)
- 39th Aviation Fighter-Bomber Division (1952–1959)

== Organization ==
=== 1947-1948 ===
- 5th Aviation Fighter Division
  - 111th Fighter Aviation Regiment
  - 113th Fighter Aviation Regiment

=== 1948-1959 ===
- 39th Aviation Fighter Division /Fighter-Bomber Division
    - Training Squadron of 39th Aviation Division (1953–1959)
  - 94th Fighter Aviation Regiment
  - 116th Fighter Aviation Regiment
  - 198th Fighter Aviation Regiment (1949–1959)
  - 165th Air Base (1953–1959)

== Headquarters ==
- Skoplje (1947–1959)

== Commanding officers ==
- Colonel Petar Radević
- Colonel Ilija Zelenika
- Colonel Petar Radević
- Colonel Nikola Lekić
- Colonel Ilija Zelenika

=== Political commissars ===
- Colonel Krsto Bosanac
- Colonel Radoje Ljubičić
- Colonel Aco Babić
