= 334th Fighter-Bomber Aviation Squadron =

334th Fighter-Bomber Aviation Squadrons: 334. lovačko-bombarderska avijacijska eskadrila
- Active: 1978 – 1990
- Disbanded: 1990
- Country: Yugoslavia
- Branch: Yugoslav Air Force
- Type: Squadron
- Role: Ground Attack; Training; Light Combat
- Part of: 107th Aviation Regiment
- Garrison/HQ: Mostar

The 334th Fighter-Bomber Aviation Squadrons (Serbo-Croatian: 334. lovačko-bombarderska avijacijska eskadrila / 334. ловачко-бомбардерска авоијацијска ескадрила) was an aviation squadron of Yugoslav Air Force formed in 1978 at Mostar airfield as 3rd Fighter-Bomber Aviation Squadron of 107th Helicopter Regiment (Serbo-Croatian: 3. lovačko-bombarderska avijacijska eskadrila 107. helikopterskog puka/ 3. ловачко-бомбардерска авоијацијска ескадрила 107. хеликоптерског пука).

== History ==
The 3rd Fighter-Bomber Aviation Squadron of 107th Helicopter Regiment was equipped with domestic made G-2 Galeb trainer-light attack jet aircraft.

In 1979 the squadron has been transformed into 1st Fighter-Bomber Aviation Squadron of Center for training of foreign armed forces pilots (Serbo-Croatian: 1. lovačko-bombarderska avijacijska eskadrila Centra za obuku pilota pripadnika stranih oružanih snaga / 1. ловачко-бомбардерска авоијацијска ескадрила Центра за обуку пилота припадника страних оружаних снага). Main task of squadron was training of Libyan Air Force pilots.

With the center being disbanded in 1988, squadron has been attached again to 107th Aviation Regiment and renamed in to 334th Fighter-Bomber Aviation Squadrons. Main task of 334th Squadron was training of reserve pilots, cadets of School of Reserve Officers.

In 1990 334th Fighter-Bomber Aviation Squadron ceased to exist due it was disbanded by "Jedinstvo 2" reorganization.

== Assignments ==
- 107th Helicopter Regiment
- Center for training of foreign armed forces pilots (1979–1988)
- 107th Aviation Regiment (1988–1990)

== Previous designations ==
- 3rd Fighter-Bomber Aviation Squadron of 107th Helicopter Regiment (1978–1979)
- 1st Fighter-Bomber Aviation Squadron (1979–1988)
- 334th Fighter-Bomber Aviation Squadron (1987–1990)

== Equipment ==
- G-2 Galeb (1978–1990)
