= 898th Helicopter Reconnaissance and Liaison Squadron =

898th Helicopter Reconnaissance and Liaison Squadron: 898. helikopterska eskadrila za izviđanje i vezu
- Active: 1981 - 1988
- Disbanded: 1988
- Country: Yugoslavia
- Branch: Yugoslav Air Force
- Type: Squadron
- Role: Liaison
- Part of: 2nd Independent Corps
- Garrison/HQ: Golubovci Air Base

The 898th Helicopter Reconnaissance and Liaison Squadron (Serbo-Croatian: 898. helikopterska eskadrila za izviđanje i vezu / 898. хеликоптерска ескадрила за извиђање и везу) was an aviation squadron of Yugoslav Air Force formed in 1981 at Golubovci air base 898th Helicopter Flight (Serbo-Croatian: 898. helikoptersko odeljenje / 898. хеликоптерско одељење).

The helicopter flight was formed by order from August 18, 1981, for with 2nd Independent Corps of Yugoslav People's Army for reconnaissance and liaison duties equipped with domestic made Soko SA,341 Gazelle helicopters. By order from March 1, 1985, it is designated as 898th Helicopter Reconnaissance and Liaison Squadron. Due to the 1988 reorganization of field armies of Yugoslav People's Army, 898th Squadron has been attached to 891st Helicopter Reconnaissance and Liaison Squadron as its helicopter flight.

== Assignments ==
- 2nd Independent Corps (1981–1988)

== Previous designations ==
- 898th Helicopter Flight (1981-1985)
- 898th Helicopter Reconnaissance and Liaison Squadron (1985-1988)

== Equipment ==
- Soko SA.341 Gazelle Hera (1981–1988)
