= 461st Light Combat Aviation Squadron =

461st Light Combat Aviation Squadron: 461. eskadrila lake borbene avijacije
- Active: 1953 – 1968; 1973 - 1981
- Disbanded: 1968; 1981
- Country: Yugoslavia
- Branch: Yugoslav Air Force
- Type: Squadron
- Role: Training; Light Combat
- Garrison/HQ: Pančevo

The 461st Light Combat Aviation Squadron (Serbo-Croatian: 461. eskadrila lake borbene avijacije / 461. ескадрила лаке борбене авијације) was an aviation squadron of Yugoslav Air Force formed in 1953 at Niš airfield as Training Squadron of 29th Aviation Division (Serbo-Croatian: Trenažna eskadrila 29. vazduhoplovne divizije / Тренажна ескадрила 29. ваздухопловне дивизије).

== History ==
Squadron was part of 29th Aviation Division. It was equipped with US-made F-47D Thunderbolt fighter-bombers and Yugoslav-made Ikarus Aero 2 trainers.

In 1959 due to the Drvar reorganization this squadron became the Light Combat Aviation Squadron of 3rd Air Command (Serbo-Croatian: Vazduhoplovna eskadrila lake borbene avijacije 3. vazduhoplovne komande / Ваздухопловна ескадрила лаке борбене авијације 3. ваздухопловне команде).

Squadron was again renamed and renumbered in April 1961 as 461st Light Combat Aviation Squadron. In same year new Soko 522 trainer aircraft have been introduced replacing older Thunderbolts and Aero 2 aircraft. By order from June 8, 1968, it has been disbanded. It was reestablished by order from March 7, 1973, at Pančevo airfield as part of 98th Aviation Brigade. Soko 522 trainers were replaced with Utva 66 liaison aircraft and Soko J-20 Kraguj counter-insurgency aircraft during the 1976 and 1977. Squadron has become independent under 1st Aviation Corps in 1978 by order from November 1976.

461st Squadron has been disbanded by order from November 16, 1981. Its personnel and equipment were attached to the 525th Training Aviation Squadron.

== Assignments ==
- 29th Aviation Division (1953–1959)
- 3rd Air Command (1959–1964)
- 98th Aviation Brigade (1964-1968, 1973-1978)
- 1st Aviation Corps (1978-1981)

== Previous designations ==
- Training Squadron of 29th Aviation Division (1953-1959)
- Light Combat Aviation Squadron of 3rd Air Command (1959–1961)
- 461st Light Combat Aviation Squadron (1961-1981)

== Bases stationed ==
- Niš (1953–1968)
- Pančevo (1973–1981)

== Equipment ==
- F-47D Thunderbolt (1953-1961)
- Ikarus Aero 2B/C (1953–1961)
- Soko 522 (1961-1968, 1973-1977)
- Soko J-20 Kraguj (1976-1981)
- Utva 66 (1977-1981)
