= Krnješevci =

Krnješevci Крњешевци (Serbian)
- Village (Selo)
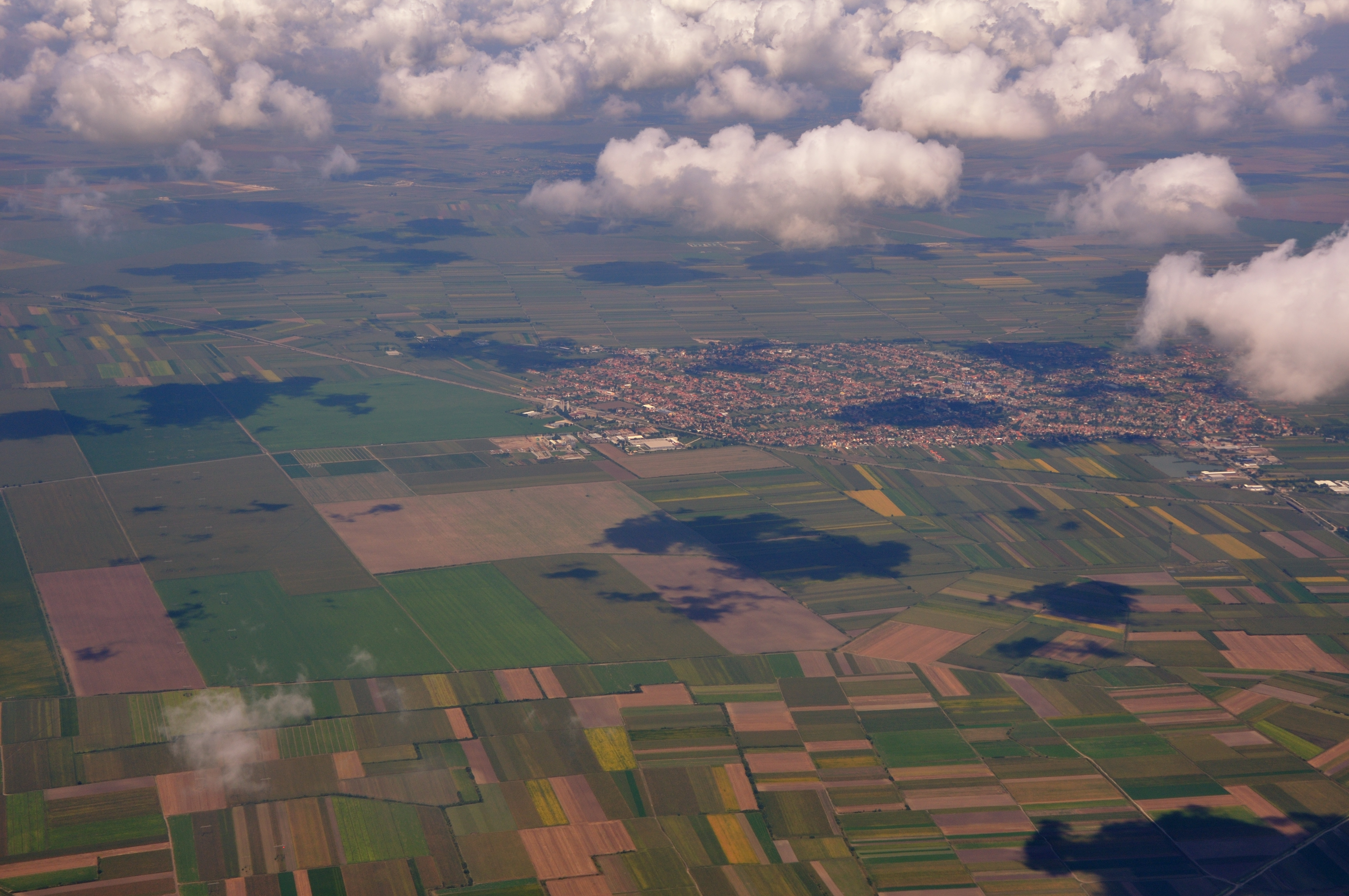
- Aerial view on Krnješevci

- Location within Vojvodina Location within Serbia Location within Europe
- Coordinates: 44°53′N 20°08′E
- Country: Serbia
- Province: Vojvodina
- Region: Syrmia
- District: Srem
- Municipality: Stara Pazova

Population (2002)
  - Total: 1,025
- Time zone: UTC+1 (CET)
  - Summer (DST): UTC+2 (CEST)

Krnješevci (Serbian Cyrillic: Крњешевци) is a village in Serbia. It is situated in the Stara Pazova municipality, in the Srem District of the Vojvodina Autonomous Province. The village has a Serb ethnic majority and its population numbering 1,025 people (2002 census).

== Name ==
The name of the settlement in Serbian is plural.

== See also ==
- List of places in Serbia
- List of cities, towns and villages in Vojvodina
