= 3rd Air Command =

3rd Air Command: 3. vazduhoplovna komanda
- Active: 1959–1964
- Disbanded: 1964
- Country: Yugoslavia
- Branch: Yugoslav Air Force
- Type: Division
- Size: 5 regiments
- HQ: Skopki Petrovac

The 3rd Air Command (Serbo-Croatian: 3. vazduhoplovna komanda/ 3. ваздухопловна команда) was a joint unit of Yugoslav Air Force.

== History ==
It was established by the order from June 27, 1959, on November 23, same year per the "Drvar" reorganization plan of Yugoslav Air Force from the 39th Aviation Division with command at Batajnica. In 1961 it suffered a change inorganization.

By the new "Drvar 2" reorganization plan of Yugoslav Air Force, 3rd Air Command has been disbanded. Its units were attached to 1st Aviation Corps.

The commander of Air command was Nikola Lekić.

== Organization ==
=== 1959-1961 ===
- 1st Air Command
    - 103rd Signal Battalion
    - Liaison Squadron of 3rd Air Command
    - Light Combat Aviation Squadron of 3rd Air Command
  - 94th Fighter Aviation Regiment
  - 198th Fighter-Bomber Aviation Regiment
  - 81st Fighter-Bomber Aviation Regiment
  - 107th Fighter-Bomber Aviation Regiment
  - 116th Fighter Aviation Regiment (1959-1960)
  - 161st Air Base
  - 165th Air Base

=== 1961-1964 ===
- 1st Air Command
    - 103rd Signal Battalion
    - 461st Light Combat Aviation Squadron
  - 94th Fighter Aviation Regiment
  - 198th Fighter-Bomber Aviation Regiment
  - 81st Support Aviation Regiment
  - 107th Helicopter Regiment
  - 161st Air Base
  - 165th Air Base

== Headquarters ==
- Skoipski Petrovac

== Commanding officers ==
- Colonel Dušan Vlaisavljević
