= 3rd Corps of Air Force and Air Defense =

3rd Corps of Air Force and Air Defense: 3. korpus ratnog vazduhoplovstva i protivvazdušne odbrane
- Active: 1964–1992
- Disbanded: 1992
- Country: Yugoslavia
- Branch: Yugoslav Air Force
- Type: Corps
- Size: 5 regiments
- HQ: Niš

The 3rd Corps of Air Force and Air Defense (Serbo-Croatian: 3. korpus ratnog vazduhoplovstva i protivvazdušne odbrane/ 3. корпус ратног ваздухопловства и противваздушне одбране) was a joint unit of Yugoslav Air Force established in 1964 as 1st Aviation Corps (Serbo-Croatian: 1. vazduhoplovni korpus / 1. ваздухопловни корпус).

== History ==
=== 1st Aviation Corps ===
The 1st Aviation Corps was formed by order on May 8, 1964, per the "Drvar 2" reorganization plan of the Yugoslav Air Force. It was created by transformation of 1st Air Command and its consolidation with units from 3rd Air Command and 7th Air Command. It consisted of all aviation units from the eastern part of Yugoslavia at military airports Batajnica, Lađevci, Niš, Skoplje and Priština.

On December 25, 1967, the command of 1st Aviation Corps has been relocated from Zemun to Niš and by February, 1986, it was renamed in to 3rd Corps of Air Force and Air Defense.

During this period Dušan Vlaisavljević, Ljubiša Ćurguz, Stevan Roglić, Borivoje Petkov and Miloš Bajčetić were commanders of the 1st Aviation Corps.

=== 3rd Corps of Air Force and Air Defense ===
The 3rd Corps of Air Force and Air Defense was formed in February 1986, by order to organize three corps of Air Force and Air Defense. The corps area of responsibility was south-east part of Yugoslavia. Its aviation units were based at Niš, Skoplje, Lađevci, Priština and Golubovci military airports.

Units of 3rd Corps of Air Force and Air Defense have participated in combat operations since end of June 1991 as assistance for other corps.

By June 1992 the 3rd Corps of Air Force and Air Defense has been disbanded, and its command was reorganized into command of Aviation Corps of newly formed Air Force of Federal Republic of Yugoslavia.

In this period commanders of 3rd Corps of Air Force and Air Defense were Marko Kulić and Ljubiša Veličković.

== Assignments ==
- Command of Yugoslav Air Force (1964–1992)

== Previous designations ==
- 1st Aviation Corps (1964–1986)
- 3rd Corps of Air Force and Air Defense (1986–1992)

== Organization ==
=== 1964-1966 ===
- 1st Aviation Corps
    - 112th Signal Battalion
    - 359th Engineering Battalion
    - 120th Fighter Aviation Squadron (until 1965)
    - 123rd Fighter Aviation Squadron (until 1965)
    - 235th Fighter-Bomber Aviation Squadron (until 1965)
    - 891st Helicopter Reconnaissance and Liaison Squadron (until 1965)
  - 103rd Reconnaissance Aviation Regiment
  - 107th Support Aviation Regiment
  - 119th Support Aviation Regiment
  - 198th Fighter-Bomber Aviation Regiment
  - 204th Fighter Aviation Regiment
  - 161st Air Base
  - 165th Air Base
  - 171st Air Base
  - 177st Air Base
  - 285th Air Base
  - 399th Air Base
  - 423th Air Base
  - 492nd Air Base

=== 1966-1978 ===
- 1st Aviation Corps
    - 112th Signal Battalion
    - 359th Engineering Battalion
  - 98th Aviation Brigade
  - 107th Support Aviation Regiment (until 1973)
  - 119th Transport Helicopter Regiment (since 1968)
  - 161st Air Base
  - 165th Air Base
  - 171st Air Base
  - 177st Air Base
  - 285th Air Base
  - 399th Air Base
  - 423th Air Base
  - 492nd Air Base

=== 1978-1986 ===
- 1st Aviation Corps
    - 112th Signal Battalion
    - 359th Engineering Battalion
    - 350th Reconnaissance Aviation Squadron (until 1982)
    - 461st Light Combat Aviation Squadron (until 1981)
  - 11th Air Defense Division
  - 98th Aviation Brigade
  - 161st Air Base
  - 165th Air Base
  - 171st Air Base
  - 177st Air Base
  - 285th Air Base
  - 399th Air Base
  - 423th Air Base
  - 492nd Air Base

=== 1986-1992 ===
- 3rd Corps of Air Force and Air Defense
    - 112th Signal Battalion
    - 359th Engineering Battalion
  - 3rd Air Reconnaissance Regiment
  - 450th Air Defense Missile Regiment
  - 83rd Fighter Aviation Regiment
  - 98th Aviation Brigade
  - 119th Aviation Brigade
  - 161st Air Base
  - 165th Air Base
  - 285th Air Base
  - 492nd Air Base

== Headquarters ==
- Zemun (1964–1967)
- Niš (1967–1992)

== Commanding officers ==
Date appointed	Name
1964–1968	Dušan Vlaisavljević
1968–1973	Ljubiša Ćurguz
1973–1978	Stevan Roglić
1978–1984	Borivoje Petkov
1984–1986	Miloš Bajčetić
1986–1991	Marko Kulić
1991–1992	Ljubiša Veličković
