= 141st Aviation Training Regiment =

141st Training Aviation Regiment: 141. školski puk
- Active: 1952–1953
- Disbanded: 1953
- Country: Yugoslavia
- Branch: Yugoslav Air Force
- Part of: Active Aviation Officers School of the Military Aviation Academy
- Garrison/HQ: Sarajevo Military Airport

The 141st Aviation Training Regiment (Serbo-Croatian Latin: 141. školski puk, 141. школски пук) was an aviation regiment established in 1952 as part of the SFR Yugoslav Air Force. The regiment was stationed at Sarajevo Military Airport until it was disbanded the following year.

== History ==
The 141st Aviation Training Regiment was formed on 1 January 1952, pursuant to an order issued on 7 December 1951. It was established at Sarajevo Military Airport as part of the Active Aviation Officers' School of the Military Aviation Academy. During its short existence it was equipped with a domestic-made trainer aircraft and the Soviet-made World War II-vintage Yak-9U single-engine fighter aircraft. The regiment was disbanded on 20 January 1953, following an order issued on 20 December 1952. The aircraft, personnel and equipment of the regiment were transferred to the 104th Aviation Training Regiment.

== Assignments ==
- Active Aviation Officers School of the Military Aviation Academy (1952–1953)

== Commanding officers ==
Date appointed	Name
	Branko Glumac
	Edo Banfić

== Aircraft ==
- Yakovlev Yak-9U (1952–1953)
- Yugoslav-made trainer aircraft (1952–1953)
