= 267th Aviation Regiment of School of Reserve Officers =

Aviation regiment

267th Aviation Regiment of School of Reserve Officers: 276. avijacijski puk
- Active: 1951 - 1953
- Disbanded: 1953
- Country: Yugoslavia
- Branch: Yugoslav Air Force
- Part of: School of Reserve Officers
- Garrison/HQ: Pančevo; Novi Sad

The 267th Aviation Regiment of School of Reserve Officers (Serbo-Croatian: 276. avijacijski puk škole rezervnih oficira avijacije / 276. авијацијски пук школе резервних официра авијације) was an aviation regiment established in 1951 as part of the SFR Yugoslav Air Force. The regiments was stationed at Pančevo and Novi Sad airports.

== History ==
The 267th Aviation Regiment of School of Reserve Officers was formed in January 1951 by order from December, 1950, at Pančevo airfield. Regiments tasks were training of reserve aviation officers and crop dusting. For its short existence it was equipped with domestic-made Aero 2 trainer aircraft. By order from June 18, 1951, regiment has moved to Novi Sad and reorganized in to Reserve Aviation Officers School. It was disbanded by order from September 10, 1953.

== Assignments ==
- School of Reserve Officers (1951–1953)

== Commanding officers ==
| Date appointed | Name |
|---|---|
| | Milan Popović |

== Equipment ==
- Ikarus Aero 2 (1951-1953)
