= 101st Fighter-Training Aviation Regiment =

101st Fighter-Training Aviation Regiment: 101. školski-lovački vazduhoplovni puk
- Active: 1945 - 1956
- Disbanded: 1956
- Country: Yugoslavia
- Branch: Yugoslav Air Force
- Part of: Military Aviation College; Active Aviation Officers School; Flight training center

The 101st Fighter-Training Aviation Regiment (Serbo-Croatian: 101. školski-lovački vazduhoplovni puk / 101. школски-ловачки ваздухопловни пук) was a unit established in 1945 as the 2nd Training Aviation Regiment (Serbo-Croatian: 2. vazduhoplovni školski puk / 2. ваздухопловни школски пук) as part of the SFR Yugoslav Air Force.

== History ==
=== 2nd Training Aviation Regiment ===
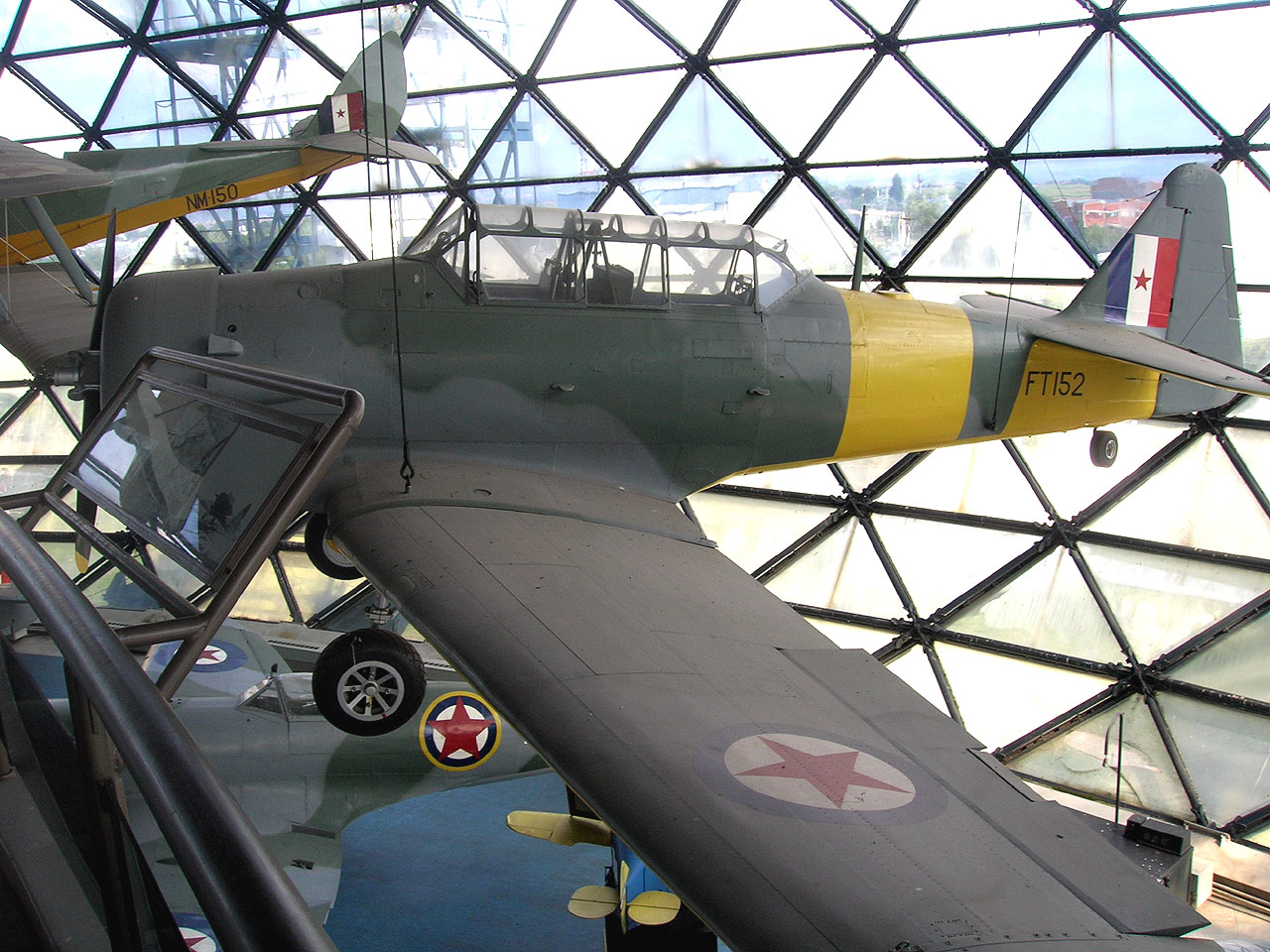
A North American T-6 Harvard trainer at the Belgrade Aviation Museum in colors that had been used by the 2nd Training Aviation Regiment

The 2nd Training Aviation Regiment was formed on September 12, 1945, by order from August of the same year. It was created by the realignment of the First Pilot School at Ečka airport, as part of the Military Aviation College. It was equipped with Tiger Moth and Harvard training aircraft. By 1946 the regiment had become a Fighter-Training unit and it was re-equipped with Soviet-made Po-2s, Yak-1s, Yak-9Us and Ilyushin Il-2s. The 2nd squadron with Ilyushin Il-2 attack aircraft left the regiment and became the 3rd Training Aviation Regiment.

By 1948 this regiment was renamed like all other units of Yugoslav Army, it became the 101st Fighter-Training Aviation Regiment.

The commanders of the regiment in this period were Ivo Novak, Albin Starc and Kosta Lekić. Commissars were Dušan Đurović, Ćiro Begović and Stevo Tišman.

=== 101st Fighter-Training Aviation Regiment ===
The regiment was based at Kovin Airport and for short period at Nikšić and Titograd airports in SR Montenegro. It moved to Banja Luka in 1949, where it was to remain until it was disbanded. It was equipped with Soviet Yakovlev trainer-fighters and domestic-made trainers.

It was disbanded on January 9, 1956.

The commanders of the regiment in this period were Aleksandar Radičević, Albin Starc and Radovan Daković.

== Assignments ==
- Military Aviation College (1945–1949)
- Active Aviation Officers School of Military Aviation Academy (1949–1952)
- Flight training center (1953–1956)

== Previous designations ==
- 2nd Training Aviation Regiment (1945–1946)
- 2nd Fighter-Training Aviation Regiment (1946–1948)
- 101st Fighter-Training Aviation Regiment (1948–1950)
- 101st Training Aviation Regiment (1950–1956)

== Bases stationed ==
- Ečka (1945–1946)
- Kovin (1946–1948)
- Nikšić (1948)
- Titograd (1948)
- Banja Luka (1949–1956)

== Commanding officers ==
Date appointed	Name
	Ivo Novak
	Albin Starc
	Kosta Lekić
	Aleksandar Radičević
	Albin Starc
	Radovan Daković

== Equipment ==
- de Havilland Tiger Moth (1945–1948)
- Norodyn Harvard Mk IIB (1945–1946)
- Po-2 (1946–1948)
- Yakovlev Yak-1 (1946–1950)
- Yakovlev Yak-9U (1946–1950)
- Ilyushin Il-2 (1946)
- Yugoslav-made trainer aircraft (1948–1956)
