= 150th Fighter-Bomber Aviation Regiment =

150th Fighter-Bomber Aviation Regiment: 150. lovačko-bombarderski avijacijski puk
- Active: 1952–1958
- Disbanded: 1958
- Country: Yugoslavia
- Branch: Yugoslav Air Force
- Size: 1 aviation squadron
- Part of: 29th Aviation Division
- Garrison/HQ: Niš Airport

The 150th Fighter-Bomber Aviation Regiment (Serbo-Croatian Latin: 150. lovačko-bombarderski avijacijski puk, 150. ловачко-бомбардерски авијацијски пук) was an aviation regiment established in 1952 as part of the SFR Yugoslav Air Force. The regimental headquarters was stationed at Niš Airport until the regiment was disbanded in 1958.

== History ==
The 150th Fighter-Bomber Aviation Regiment was formed on 1 February 1952, pursuant to an order issued on 7 December 1951, with its command at Niš Airport. The regiment was part of the 29th Aviation Division. It consisted of one squadron equipped with US-built F-47D Thunderbolt fighter aircraft. It was disbanded by the beginning of 1958, with its aircraft, personnel and equipment transferred to other units of the 29th Aviation Division.

== Assignments ==
- 29th Aviation Division (1952–1958)

== Commanding officers ==
Date appointed	Name
	Ante Sardelić
	Ivan Javor
	Svetolik Muždeka
	Franc Rupnik

== Aircraft ==
- P-47/F-47D Thunderbolt
