= 81st Support Aviation Regiment =

81st Support Aviation Regiment: 83. puk pomoćne avijacije
- Active: 1944-1961; 1961-1964
- Disbanded: 1961 and 1964
- Country: Soviet Union; Yugoslavia
- Branch: Soviet Air Force; Yugoslav Air Force
- Type: Regiment; Brigade
- Role: Support; Assault; Fighter-Bomber
- Part of: 3rd Air Command

The 81st Support Aviation Regiment (Serbo-Croatian: 81. puk pomoćne avijacije / 83. пук помоћне авијације) was an aviation regiment established in 1944 as 2nd Yugoslav Assault Regiment (Serbo-Croatian: 2. jugoslovenski vazduhoplovni jurišni puk / 2. југословенски ваздухопловни јуришни пук, Russian: 2-й Югославский штурмовой авиационный полк) formed from Yugoslav partisan aviators on training in Soviet Union.

== History ==
=== 2nd Yugoslav Assault Regiment ===
The 2nd Yugoslav Assault Regiment was formed on 15 October 1944 in Grozni, USSR, from Yugoslav partisan aviators sent on training by October 1944. It consisted from three squadrons equipped with new Il-2 ground-attack aircraft. It had 233 personal, which from eight were staff officers, 37 pilots, 43 mechanics, and others. By the end of training and arming with Ilyushins regiment became operational by March 3, 1945. It has moved from USSR taking off by June 22, 1945, and land in Yugoslavia by July 17, 1945, at Sombor airport. Same day it was renamed in to 554th Assault Aviation Regiment.

The commander of regiment was Mirko Šćepanović and commissar was Mile Rodić.

=== 554th Assault Aviation Regiment ===
The 554th Assault Aviation Regiment was formed on July 17, 1945, by renaming the 2nd Yugoslav Assault Regiment at Sombor airport. It was part of the 11th Aviation Division. By the August same year, regiment was subordinated to 1st Aviation Division.

It was dislocated from Sombor to Skoplje airport by 1945, and next year, 1946 it moved to Niš airport.

By 1948 this regiment was renamed like all other units of Yugoslav Army, and became the 81st Assault Aviation Regiment.

The commanders of the regiment in this period were Mirko Šćepanović and Ivan Salević and commissar was Vlado Bakarić.

=== 81st Assault and Fighter-Bomber Aviation Regiment ===
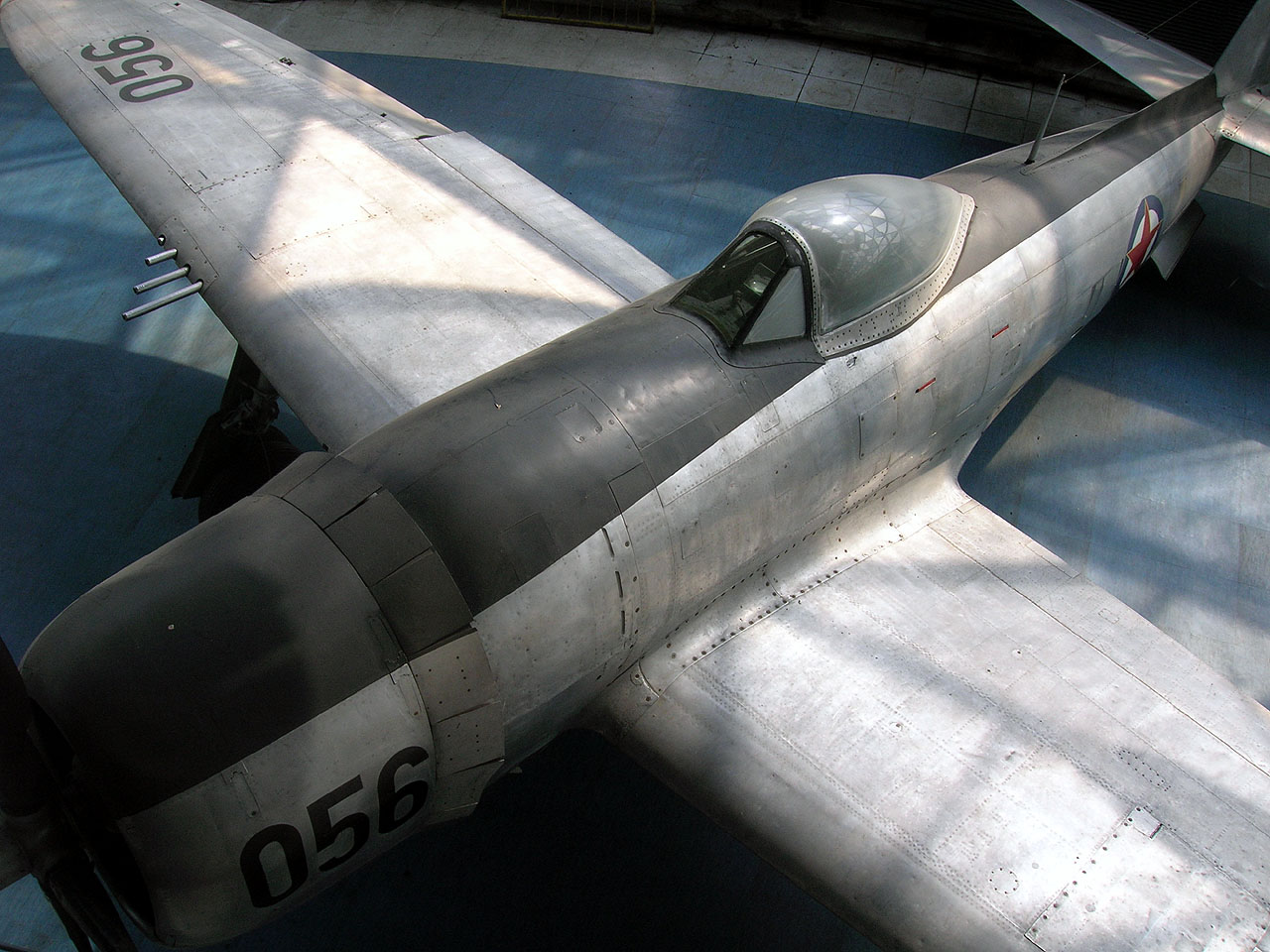
F-47D Thunderbolt fighter which has served with 81st Fighter-Bomber Aviation Regiment in 1953, now at Belgrade Aviation Museum.

The 81st Assault Aviation Regiment remain at Niš. In 1953 Soviet-made Il-2 ground-attack aircraft were replaced with US-build F-47D Thunderbolt fighters. In that period regiment was renamed to 81st Fighter-Bomber Aviation Regiment (Serbo-Croatian: 81. lovačko-bombarderski avijacijski puk / 81. ловачко-бомбардерски авијацијски пук).

The 81st Fighter-Bomber Aviation Regiment was disbanded by the March 1961.

The commanders of regiment in this period were Dimitrije Kovačević, Slobodan Alagić, Svetolik Muždeka, Vlado Kecman, Ljubomir Vučkević and Bogdan Verbole.

=== Re-establishment of 81st Regiment ===
By April 1961 at Niš airport 81st Support Aviation Regiment was formed from 677th Transport Aviation Squadron equipped with German-made Junkers Ju 52 transport aircraft and 891st Liaison Aviation Squadron equipped with Yugoslav-made Ikarus Kurir liaison aircraft.

The new 81st Regiment took the number, banner and continued tradition of former 81st Fighter-Bomber Aviation Regiment.

It was disbanded by the 1964 year due to the "Drvar 2" reorganization plan. The 677th Transport Aviation Squadron was attached 107th Support Aviation Regiment, while 891st Liaison Aviation Squadron was independent for some time.

== Assignments ==
- 11th Aviation Fighter Division (1945)
- 1st Aviation Division (1945–1948)
- 29th Aviation Division (1948–1959)
- 3rd Air Command (1959–1961)
  - Disbanded
- 3rd Air Command (1961–1964)

== Previous designations ==
- 2nd Yugoslav Assault Regiment (1944-1945)
- 554th Assault Aviation Regiment (1945-1948)
- 81st Assault Aviation Regiment (1948-1953)
- 81st Fighter-Bomber Aviation Regiment (1954-1961)
  - Disbanded
- 81st Support Aviation Regiment (1961-1964)

== Organization ==
=== 1961-1964 ===
- 81st Support Aviation Regiment
  - 677th Transport Aviation Squadron
  - 891st Liaison Aviation Squadron

== Bases stationed ==
- Grozni (1944-1945)
- Sombor (1945)
- Skoplje (1945-1946)
- Niš (1946-1961, 1961-1964)

== Commanding officers ==
Date appointed	Name
	Mirko Šćepanović
	Ivan Salević
	Dimitrije Kovačević
	Slobodan Alagić
	Svetolik Muždeka
	Vlado Kecman
	Ljubomir Vučkević
	Bogdan Verbole

== Equipment ==
- Ilyushin Il-2 (1944–1953)
- F-47D Thunderbolt (1953–1961)
- Junkers Ju 52 (1961–1964)
- Ikarus Kurir (1961–1964)
