= 40th Fighter Aviation Regiment =

40th Fighter4 Aviation Regiment: 40. lovački avijacijski puk
- Active: 1955 - 1959
- Disbanded: 1959
- Country: Yugoslavia
- Branch: Yugoslav Air Force
- Part of: 32nd Aviation Division
- Garrison/HQ: Pleso Airport

The 40th Fighter Aviation Regiment (Serbo-Croatian: 40. lovačk4i avijacijski puk / 40. ловачк4и авијацијски пук) was established in 1955 as part of the SFR Yugoslav Air Force. The command of the regiment was stationed at Zagreb airport until it was disbanded in 1959.

== History ==
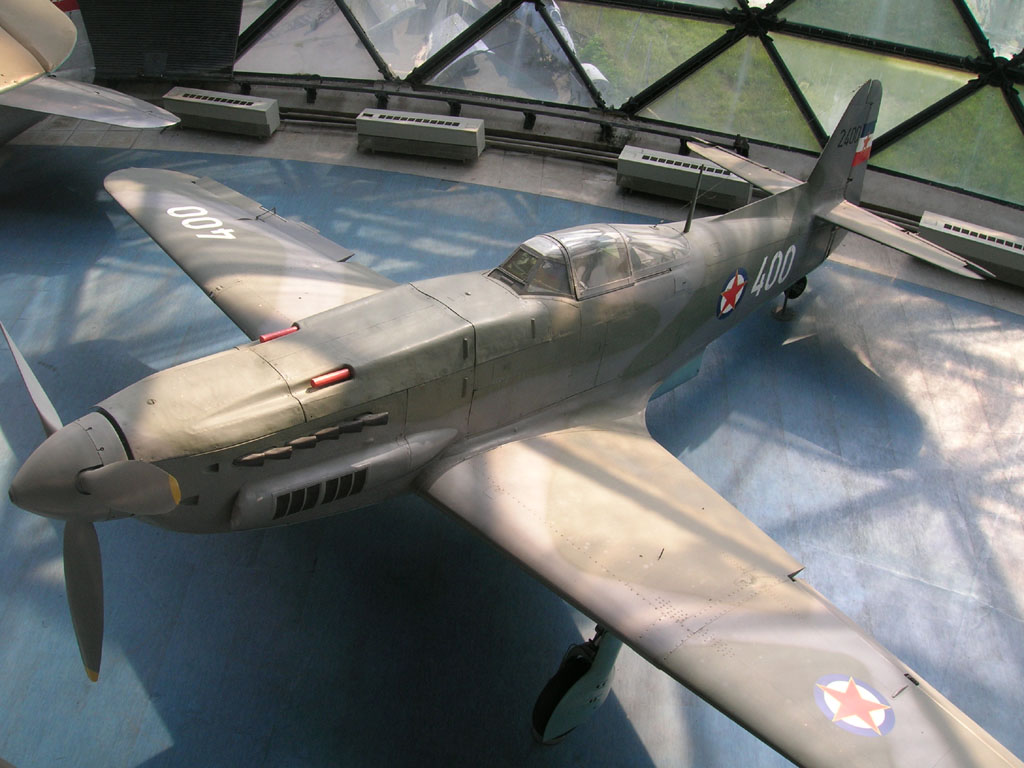
An Ikarus S-49C Yugoslav-made fighter which served with the 40th Aviation Regiment from 1955 to 1959, now at the Belgrade Aviation Museum

The 40th Fighter Aviation Regiment was formed on July 7 1955, at Pula Airport from S-49C aircraft of the 185th Aviation Regiment. After it reached its completed establishment, the regiment was re-located to Zagreb Airport where it became part of the 32nd Aviation Division.

It was disbanded by the beginning of 1959.

== Assignments ==
- 32nd Aviation Division (1955–1959)

== Commanding officers ==
Date appointed	Name
	Živko Ranisavljević

== Equipment ==
- Ikarus S-49C
