= 94th Fighter Aviation Regiment =

94th Fighter Aviation Regiment: 94. lovački puk
- Active: 1944-1964
- Disbanded: 1964
- Country: Soviet Union; Yugoslavia
- Branch: Soviet Air Force; Yugoslav Air Force
- Type: Regiment
- Role: Fighter
- Part of: 3rd Air Command
- Engagements: Syrmian Front

The 94th Fighter Aviation Regiment (Serbo-Croatian: 94. lovački puk / 94. ловачки пук) was an aviation regiment established in 1944 as 111th Fighter Aviation Regiment (Serbo-Croatian: 111. vazduhoplovni lovački puk / 111. ваздухопловни ловачки пук) formed from Yugoslav partisan aviators, trained and equipped by Soviet Air Force.

== History ==
=== 111th Fighter Aviation Regiment ===
The 111th Fighter Aviation Regiment was established on December 25, 1944, in Novi Sad, from Yugoslav partisan aviators with the Soviet Air Force 17th Air Army's 117th Guards Fighter Aviation Regiment (117.GIAP). It has become independent form Soviet command and personal since May 1945. Regiment was part of 11th Aviation Fighter Division, it was equipped with Soviet Yak-1M fighter aircraft. Regiment has taken part in final operations for liberation of Yugoslavia. During the combat operations it was based at Novi Sad and Kupusina/Sombor airfields.

After the war regiment has moved to Slkoplje airfield, where it has remain until it was disbanded. New Yak-3 fighters have been introduced in service by the 1945, and Yak-9 by 1948.

By the 1948 year this regiment was renamed like all other units of Yugoslav Army, so it has become 94th Fighter Aviation Regiment.

The commanders of regiment in this period were Ljubomir Popadić, Mihajlo Nikolić, Milan Marijanović, Gojko Grubor. Commissars were Milan Zrilić and Ćiro Begović.

=== 94th Fighter and Fighter-Bomber Aviation Regiment ===
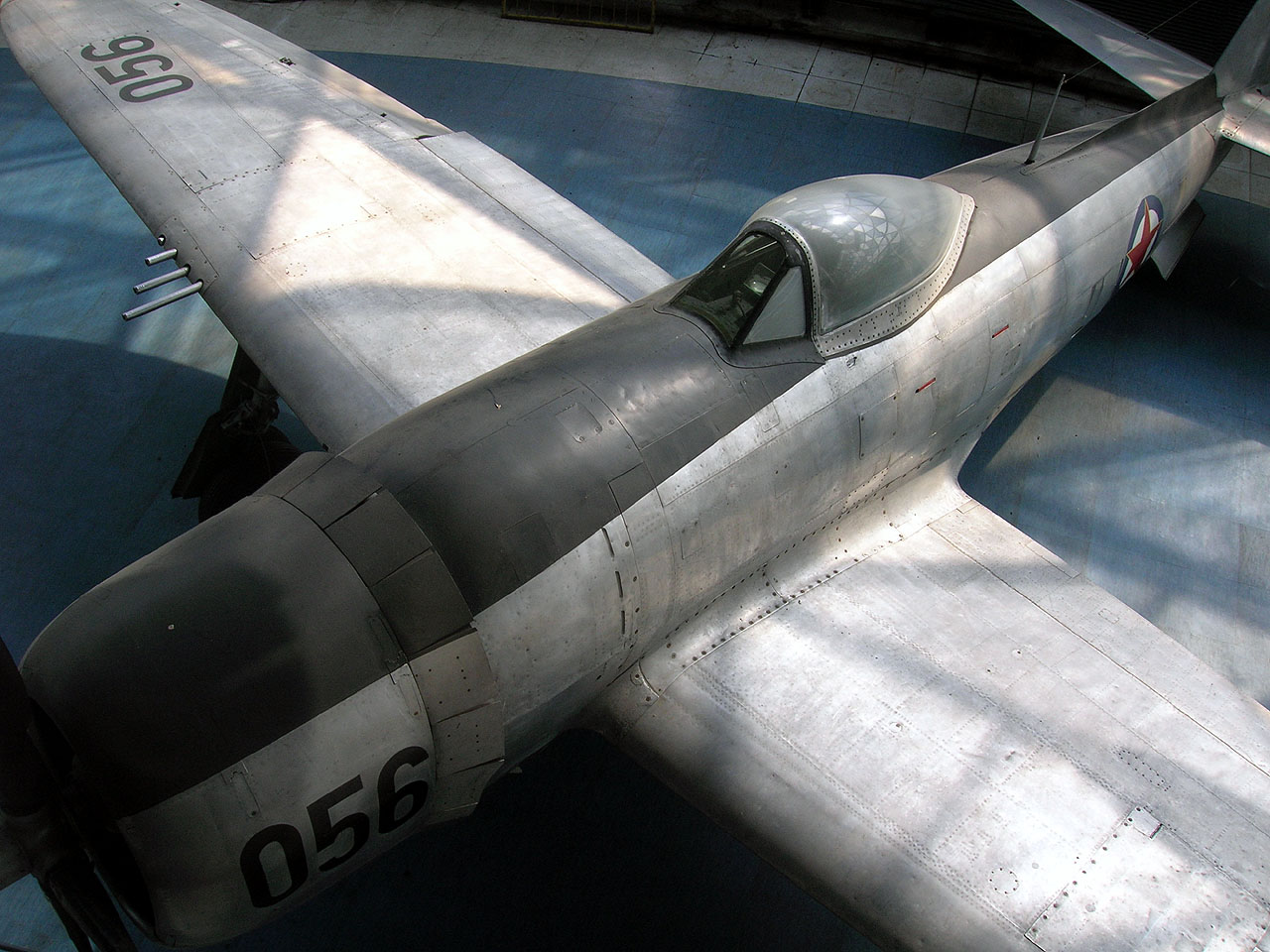
F-47D Thunderbolt fighter which has served with 94th Fighter-Bomber Aviation Regiment in 1953, now at Belgrade Aviation Museum.

The 94th Fighter Aviation Regiment was formed by renaming of 111th Fighter Aviation Regiment Regiment at Skoplje airport. Regiment was part of 39th Aviation Division until 1959, when it was subordinated to 3rd Air Command. By year 1952 Soviet Yak fighters have been replaced by US-build F-47D Thunderbolt fighters. In that period regiment was renamed to 94th Fighter-Bomber Aviation Regiment (Serbo-Croatian: 94. lovačko-bombarderski avijacijski puk / 94. ловачко-бомбардерски авијацијски пук). Thunderbolt's have been replaced with jet fighter-bombers, Republic F-84 Thunderjet's in year 1954. Regiment has changed its name back to 94th Fighter Aviation Regiment as the F-84's were replaced with F-86E Sabre's by 1959.

By the 1961 and application of the "Drvar" reorganization for the Air Force, new type designation system is used to identify squadrons, so the two squadrons of 94th Fighter Aviation Regiment have become 122nd and 123rd Fighter Aviation Squadron.

It was disbanded by 1964 per the "Drvar 2" reorganization plan. Its 122nd Fighter Aviation Squadron was also disbanded, while its 123rd Fighter Aviation Squadron remain as independent in 1st Air Corps.

The commanders of regiment in this period were Gojko Grubor, Mihajlo Vranješević, Bogdan Popović, Nikola Đurđević, Stojan Mutić, Murat Hanić, Živko Radosavljević and Nikola Mijatov.

== Assignments ==
- 11th Aviation Fighter Division (1944–1945)
- 1st Aviation Division (1945–1947)
- 5th Aviation Fighter Division (1947–1948)
- 39th Aviation Division (1948–1959)
- 3rd Air Command (1959–1964)

== Previous designations ==
- 111th Fighter Aviation Regiment (1944–1948)
- 94th Fighter Aviation Regiment (1948–1952)
- 94th Fighter-Bomber Aviation Regiment (1952–1959)
- 94th Fighter Aviation Regiment (1959–1964)

== Organization ==
=== 1961-1964 ===
- 94th Fighter Aviation Regiment
  - 122nd Fighter Aviation Squadron
  - 123rd Fighter Aviation Squadron

== Bases stationed ==
- Novi Sad (1944)
- Kupusina, Sombor (1944–1945)
- Skopski Petrovac (1945–1964)

== Commanding officers ==
| Date appointed | Name |
|---|---|
| | Ljubomir Popadić |
| | Mihajlo Nikolić |
| | Milan Marijanović |
| | Gojko Grubor |
| | Mihajlo Vranješević |
| | Bogdan Popović |
| | Nikola Đurđević |
| | Stojan Mutić |
| | Murat Hanić |
| | Živko Radosavljević |
| | Nikola Mijatov |

== Equipment ==
- Yakovlev Yak-1M (1944–1948)
- Yakovlev Yak-3 (1945–1948)
- Yakovlev Yak-9P (1948–1952)
- F-47D Thunderbolt (1952–1954)
- F-84G Thunderjet (1954–1959)
- F-86E Sabre (1959–1964)
