= 116th Fighter Aviation Regiment =

116th Fighter Aviation Regiment: 116. lovački puk
- Active: 1944-1960
- Disbanded: 1960
- Country: Soviet Union; Yugoslavia
- Branch: Soviet Air Force; Yugoslav Air Force
- Type: Regiment
- Role: Fighter
- Part of: 3rd Air Command
- Engagements: Syrmian Front

The 116th Fighter Aviation Regiment (Serbo-Croatian: 116. lovački puk, 116. ловачки пук) was a unit originally established in 1944 as the 113th Fighter Aviation Regiment (113. vazduhoplovni lovački puk, 113. ваздухопловни ловачки пук). It was formed from Yugoslav partisan aviators, trained and equipped by the Soviet Air Force.

== History ==
=== 113th Fighter Aviation Regiment ===
The 113th Fighter Aviation Regiment was established on December 15, 1944, in Ruma, from Yugoslav partisan aviators with the Soviet Air Force 17th Air Army's 267th Fighter Aviation Regiment (267.IAP). It became independent from Soviet command and personnel in May 1945. The regiment was part of the 11th Aviation Fighter Division and equipped with Soviet Yak-1M fighter aircraft. The regiment took part in final operations for the liberation of Yugoslavia and was based at Ruma, Ilinovac, Bački Brestovac, Ilinovac (again) and Velika Gorica/Pleso airfields.

By 1945 then new Yak-3 fighters were introduced into service. After the war the regiment moved to Slovenia, being based at Ljubljana and Cerklje airfields. By 1947 it was re-located to Macedonia, where it was based at Skopje. From June 18 to September 21 1947, the regiment was based at Tirana in Albania.

In 1948 this regiment was renamed, like all other units of the Yugoslav Army, becoming the 116th Fighter Aviation Regiment.

The commanders of the regiment in this period were Miljenko Lipovšćak, Nikola Cvikić, Ljubo Kojić and Spasen Zarevski. The commissars were Drago Đuričković, Đuro Savić and Miloš Milikić.

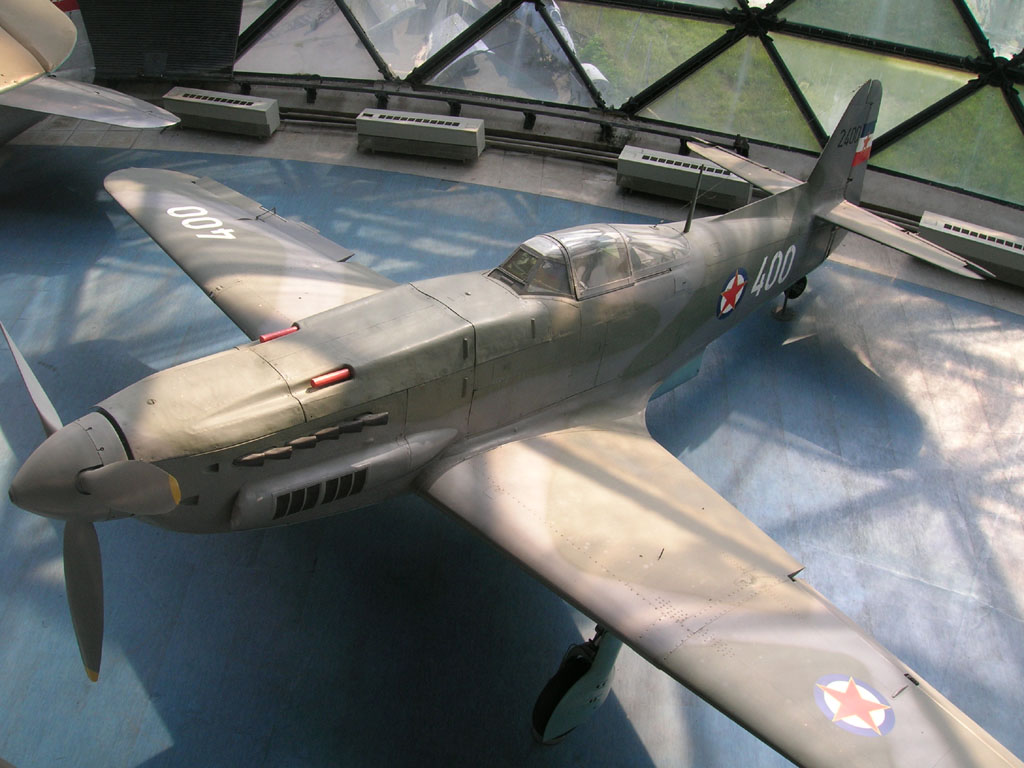
An Ikarus S-49C Yugoslav-made fighter which served in the 116th Fighter Aviation Regiment from April 1959, now at the Belgrade Aviation Museum

=== 116th Fighter Aviation Regiment ===
The regiment was formed by renaming the 113th Fighter Aviation Regiment which was at Skopski Petrovac airport, where it remained until it was disbanded. The regiment was part of the 39th Aviation Division until 1959, when it was subordinated to the 3rd Air Command. It was equipped with Soviet Yak-3s until 1952 when they were replaced with new domestically produced Ikarus S-49C fighters. The regiment also had a number of various trainers, including the Soviet Yak-9U, the domestically produced Utva 212 and others.

It was disbanded on October 15 1960.

The commanders of the regiment in this period were Spasen Zarevski, Branko Kuna, Aleksandar Bračun, Drago Stanisavljević, Petar Pavić and Stevan Leka.

== Assignments ==
- 11th Aviation Fighter Division (1944-1945)
- 2nd Aviation Division (1945-1947)
- 5th Aviation Fighter Division (1947-1948)
- 39th Aviation Division (1948–1959)
- 3rd Air Command (1959–1960)

== Previous designations ==
- 113th Fighter Aviation Regiment (1944-1948)
- 116th Fighter Aviation Regiment (1948-1960)

== Bases stationed ==
- Ruma (1944)
- Bački Brestovac (1944)
- Ilinovac (1944)
- Velika Gorica/Pleso (1944)
- Ljubljana (1945)
- Cerklje (1946-1947)
- Skopski Petrovac (1947)
- Tirana, Albania (1947)
- Skopski Petrovac (1947-1960)

== Commanding officers ==
Date appointed	Name
	Miljenko Lipovšćak
	Nikola Cvikić
	Ljubo Kojić
	Spasen Zarevski
	Branko Kuna
	Aleksandar Bračun
	Drago Stanisavljević
	Petar Pavić
	Stevan Leka

== Aircraft ==
- Yakovlev Yak-1M (1944–1948)
- Yakovlev Yak-3 (1945–1952)
- Ikarus S-49C (1952–1960)
- Yakovlev Yak-9U (1948–1950)
- Utva 212 (1948-1960)
