= Ikarus Kurir =

Yugoslavian military aircraft

Kurir
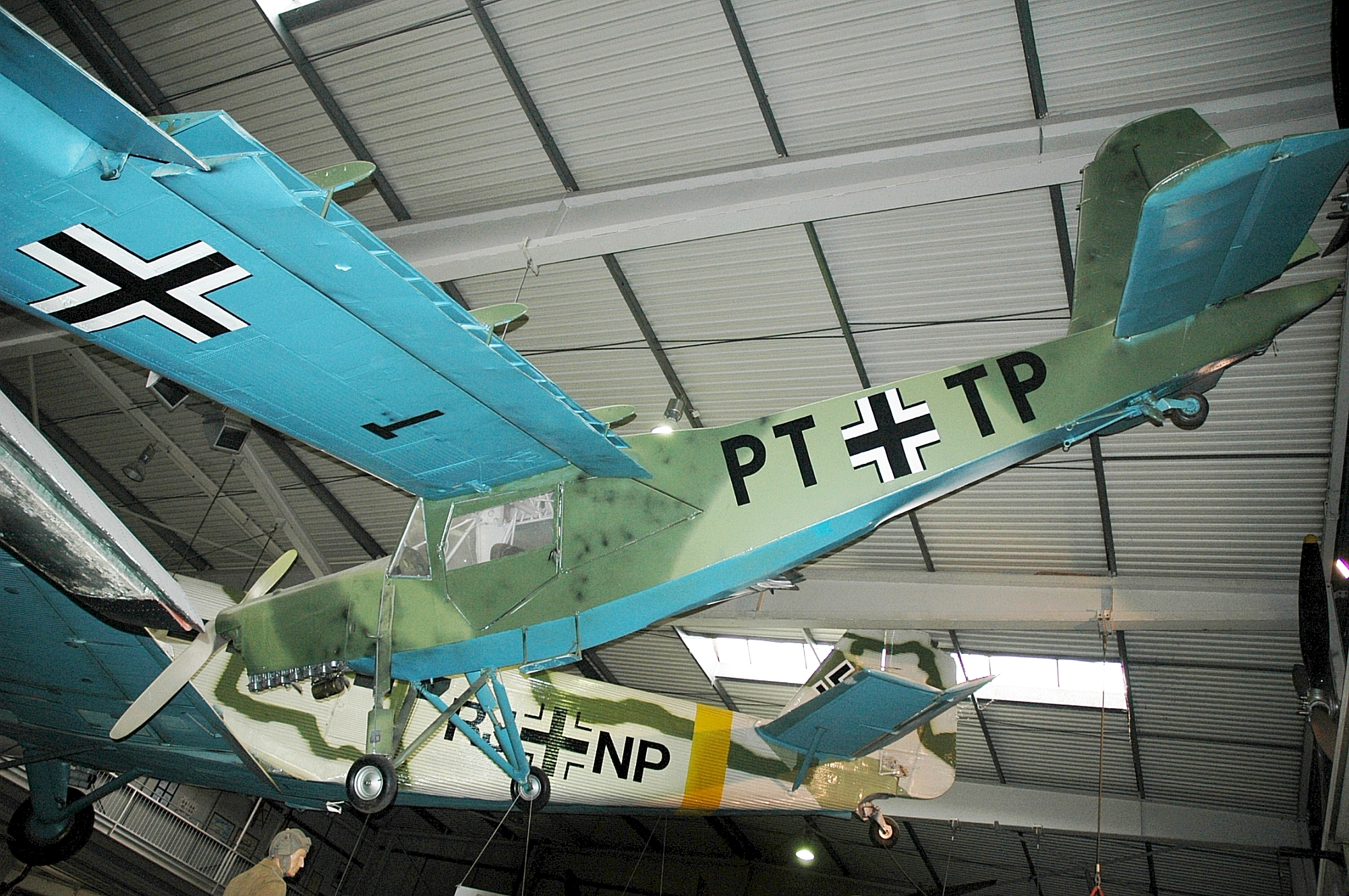

General information
- Type: Army liaison, ambulance and parachute aircraft
- National origin: Republic of Yugoslavia
- Manufacturer: Ikarbus, Belgrade
- Designer: Boris Cijan and Dagoslav Petrovic
- Primary user: Yugoslav Air Force
- Number built: c.145

History
- Manufactured: 1958-61
- Introduction date: 1955
- First flight: 1955
- Retired: 1972 (from Yugoslav Air Force service)

The Ikarus Kurir (English: Courier) is a single-engined high-wing monoplane designed in Yugoslavia for army liaison and air ambulance work from small airfields. Built in large numbers, it served with the Yugoslav Air Force (JRV) until 1972, when it entered civilian use.

== Design and development ==
The Kurir was built in a new factory at the old Ikarus site in Zemun, Belgrade, though like all Yugoslav aircraft of the period it was a product of the centralised national design centre. It is sometimes referred to as the Cijan Kurir after one of its designers.

The Kurir has the high wing and tall undercarriage typical of single-engined STOL aircraft and is similar in appearance to the Fieseler Storch. Unlike the Storch, the Kurir has an all-metal, cantilever wing. There are short ailerons outboard, with the rest of the trailing edge filled with electrically operated Fowler flaps. Leading edge slots are fitted ahead of the ailerons. The combination of flaps and slots enables the Kurir to reach 15 m (50 ft) altitude in a distance of 220 m (720 ft) and to land from the same height in 100 m (330 ft).

The fuselage is also all-metal and rectangular in cross section. The tail unit has a metal frame but is fabric covered. The tall fin carries an inset, tabbed, rudder and is braced to the horizontal tail, which is set on top of the fuselage. The glazed cabin, placed under the wing, normally seats two, but a third seat can be added or both rear seats removed to make room for two stretchers. The Kurir was originally powered by a 155 hp (116 kW) DM-6R six-cylinder inverted air-cooled engine. Geared, this drives a two-bladed constant-speed propeller. The DM-6R, otherwise known as the Walter/DMB DM-6R was a Yugolav-modified Walter Minor 6-III. It proved to have vibration problems so later Kurirs were fitted with a Lycoming O-435-1 engine and are usually known as Kurir L.

The Kurir has a fixed, tailwheel undercarriage. The two tall, long-stroke, shock-absorbing main legs mounted on the upper fuselage sides just forward of the cabin have supplementary bracing; each carries a wheel fitted with brakes. Alternatively, skis can be fitted. At least one was configured as a floatplane.

== Operational history ==
About 145 Kurirs were built, serving with the Yugoslav Air Force until 1972. Many were then released for civilian use, mostly appearing on the Yugoslav register and serving in flying clubs. As of July 2010 one Kurir L was registered in the US, one in Slovenia and one in Croatia.

== Variants ==
- Kurir DM-6R: standard production model with DM-6R engine for Yugoslav Air Force.
- Kurir H: floatplane version.
- Kurir L: second series with Lycoming O-435-1.

== Operators ==
Yugoslavia

- Yugoslav Air Force
- Letalski center Maribor

== Aircraft on display ==
Two Kurirs, one a Kurir L, are on display in the Museum of Aviation (Belgrade), Serbia. Another is in the Sinsheim Auto & Technik Museum, Sinsheim, Germany, painted as a Storch.

== Specifications (DM-6R) ==
Data from

General characteristics

- Crew: 2/3
- Length: 9.68 m (31 ft 9 in)
- Wingspan: 14.9 m (48 ft 11 in)
- Height: 2.5 m (8 ft 2 in)
- Gross weight: 1,400 kg (3,086 lb) two-seat configuration
- Powerplant: 1 × DM-6R air-cooled 6-cylinder inverted inline, geared, 116 kW (155 hp)
- Propellers: 2-bladed , constant speed

Performance

- Maximum speed: 189 km/h (117 mph, 102 kn)
- Cruise speed: 160 km/h (99 mph, 86 kn)
- Range: 760 km (470 mi, 410 nmi)
- Service ceiling: 3,300 m (10,800 ft)
