= 105th Fighter-Bomber Aviation Regiment =

105th Fighter-Bomber Aviation Regiment: 105. lovačko-bombarderski avijacijski puk
- Active: 1946–1992
- Disbanded: 1949–1951; 1992
- Country: Yugoslavia
- Branch: Yugoslav Air Force
- Part of: Military Aviation College; Active Aviation Officers School; Flight training center

The 105th Fighter-Bomber Aviation Regiment (Serbo-Croatian: 105. lovačko-bombarderski avijacijski puk / 105. ловачко-бомбардерски авијацијски пук) was an aviation regiment established in 1946 as 3rd Training Aviation Regiment (3. vazduhoplovni školski puk / 3. ваздухопловни школски пук) as part of the Yugoslav Air Force.

== History ==
=== 3rd Training Aviation Regiment ===
The 3rd Training Aviation Regiment was formed on December 201, 1946 by order from August 1945 at Kovin airfield. It was formed from 2nd Squadron of 2nd Training Aviation Regiment equipped with Soviet-made Il-2, UT-2 and Yugoslav-made trainer aircraft, as part of Military Aviation College. By the 1947 the regiment had composed from two squadrons, and later number of squadrons was reduced to just one.

By the 1948 year this regiment was renamed like all other units of Yugoslav Army, so it has become 105th Assault-Training Aviation Regiment (105. vazduhoplovni školski puk / 105. јуришни ваздухопловни школски пук).

The commander of regiment in this period was Aleksandar Radičević-Zemlja.

=== 105th Regiment ===
The 105th Assault-Training Aviation Regiment was based at Kovin airfield for short period. By year 1949 it was dislocated to Mostar airport, where it has remain also for short time, and it has moved to Nikšić, until it was disbanded. It was equipped with Soviet Il-2 attack-trainers, Yakovlev UT-2 trainers and domestic made trainers.

Regiment was reestablished in 1951 at Titograd airport, equipped with Aero-2 training aircraft as part of Active Aviation Officers School of Military Aviation Academy and from 1953 as part of Flight training center. In year 1956 regiment was reformed in to 2nd Pilot School. The Aero-2 aircraft were replaced in the late 1950s with Aero-3 and Soko 522 trainers.

By the 1960 regiment was again renamed in to 105th Training Aviation Regiment (105. avijacijski školski puk / 105. авијацијски школски пук) which was dislocated to Zemunik from February 2, 1961. Same year, with the application of the "Drvar" reorganization of the Air Force, a new type of designation system was used to identify the squadrons of the regiment, which became the 463rd, 464th and the 465th Light Combat Aviation Squadrons.

New domestic made G-2 Galeb trainer jet aircraft have replaced Aero-3 and Soko 522 piston-engine trainers in 1966, and three squadrons have been reorganized in to just two - 249th and 251st Fighter-Bomber Aviation Squadron. In 1969 Regiment has been last time renamed in to 105th Fighter-Bomber Aviation Regiment. By the 1974 Czechoslovak-made Zlin 526F aerobatic aircraft were introduced with 3rd Mixed Aviation Squadron of 105th Regiment, which has later in 1976 been renumbered as 333rd Squadron. Domestic Utva 75 basic trainers were introduced in 333rd Squadron by 1980 being used for flight selection of Military Aviation Academy cadets and their basic training. Later in middle 1980s 333rd Squadron has formed the aerobatic team of the Yugoslav Air Force with six IJ-21 Jastreb light attack aircraft painted in yellow with the colors of the Yugoslav Flag in blue, white and red, named Leteće zvezde (Flying stars).

In 1986 229th Squadron has been reequipped with new G-4 Super Galeb advanced training jet aircraft which have replaced G-2 Galeb in that squadron. By 1990 seven G-4 Super Galeb aircraft replaced the IJ-21 Jastrebs with the Leteće zvezde team. They were painted in colors of Yugoslav Flag, blue, white and red.

The Regiment was active in combat operations during the 1991 and early 1992 during the war in Croatia. Due to the first Croatian hostile activities against Yugoslav People's Army units, 105th Regiment received orders to retreat from Zemunik airport to Udbina airport in Serb controlled Krajina with its two combat squadrons, 249th and 251st Fighter-Bomber Aviation Squadron, while 333rd Squadron was dislocated to Golubovci Air Base. Two squadrons at Udbina have got their nicknames and badges - 249th - "Kobre" (Cobras) and 251st - "Pume" (Pumas). The main tasks of 105th Regiment during the war were air support to Yugoslav People's Army ground units of 9th Corps and Naval forces.

Due to the withdrawal of Yugoslav People's Army from Croatia, regiment has been dislocated to Golubovci, Montenegro, where it has been disbanded in early April 1992. The 251st Fighter-Bomber Aviation Squadron was reattached to 172nd Aviation Brigade. 249th Squadron was disbanded and its equipment and personal were divided by 172nd Aviation Brigade and 252nd Fighter-Bomber Aviation Squadron.

The commanders of regiment in this period were Aleksandar Radičević, Branko Glumac, Branislav Novaković, Svetislav Nešović, Radivoje Kaćanski, Ismet Kulenović, Teodor Majev, Momčilo Nikić, Gajo Vukčević, Miloš Bajčetić, Janez Turk, Milovan Ristić, Radomir Brković, Jovan Marić, Radovan Veselinović and Nikola Dukić.

=== Aftermath ===
In 1993, the Army of the Republic of Serb Krajina re-established the unit as its 105th Aviation Brigade.

== Assignments ==
- Military Aviation College (1946–1949)
- Active Aviation Officers School of Military Aviation Academy (1949–1952)
- Flight training center (1953–1960)
- Military Aviation Academy (1960–1991)

== Previous designations ==
- 3rd Training Aviation Regiment (1945–1948)
- 105th Assault-Training Aviation Regiment (1948–1949)
- 105th Training Aviation Regiment (1951–1956)
- 2nd Pilot School (1956–1960)
- 105th Training Aviation Regiment (1960–1969)
- 105th Fighter-Bomber Aviation Regiment (1969–1992)

== Organization ==
=== 1961–1966 ===
- 105th Training Aviation Regiment
  - 463rd Light Combat Aviation Squadron
  - 464th Light Combat Aviation Squadron
  - 465th Light Combat Aviation Squadron

=== 1966–1974 ===
- 105th Training Aviation Regiment (Fighter-Bomber Aviation Regiment)
  - 249th Fighter-Bomber Aviation Squadron
  - 251st Fighter-Bomber Aviation Squadron

=== 1974–1992 ===
- 105th Fighter-Bomber Aviation Regiment
  - 249th Fighter-Bomber Aviation Squadron
  - 251st Fighter-Bomber Aviation Squadron
  - 3rd Mixed Aviation Squadron/ 333rd Mixed Aviation Squadron (Leteće zvezde aerobatic group since 1985 until 1991)

== Air Bases ==
- Kovin (1946–1949)
- Mostar (1949)
- Nikšić (1949)
- Titograd (1951–1961)
- Zemunik (1961–1991)
- Udbina Airport (1991–1992)
- Golubovci (1992)

== Commanding officers ==
Date appointed	Name
	Aleksandar Radičević-Zemlja
	Aleksandar Radičević
	Branko Glumac
	Branislav Novaković
1954 (died when his aircraft crashed on February 8, 1955)	Svetislav Nešović,
1955	Radivoje Kaćanski
1957	Ismet Kulenović
1962	Teodor Majev
1964	Momčilo Nikić
1968	Gajo Vukčević
1972	Miloš Bajčetić
1976	Janez Turk
1980	Milovan Ristić
1981	Radomir Brković
1986	Jovan Marić
1989	Radovan Veselinović
1991 - 1992	Nikola Dukić

== Equipment ==
- Ilyushin Il-2 (1946–1949)
- Yakovlev UT-2 (1946–1949)
- Ikarus Aero 2B/C (1946–1949, 1951–1958)
- Utva Aero 3 (1958–1966)
- Soko 522 (1959–1966)
- Soko G-2 Galeb (1966–1992)
- Zlin 526F (1973/4–1988)
- Utva 75 (1980–1992)
- Soko G-4 Super Galeb (1986–1992)
- Soko IJ-21 Jastreb (1985–1990), used by Leteće zvezde
