= 185th Fighter-Bomber Aviation Regiment =

185th Fighter-Bomber Aviation Regiment: 185. lovačko-bombarderski avijacijski puk
- Active: 1949 – 1991
- Disbanded: 1991
- Country: Yugoslavia
- Branch: Yugoslav Air Force
- Part of: Aviation Officers School; Aviation Officers College; Aviation Application School; Aviation Training School; Military Aviation Academy
- Engagements: Yugoslav wars

The 185th Fighter-Bomber Aviation Regiment (Serbo-Croatian: 185. ловачко-бомбардерски авијацијски пук, romanized: 185. lovačko-bombarderski avijacijski puk) was established in 1949 as the 185th Mixed Aviation Regiment (Serbo-Croatian: 185. мешовити пук, romanized: 185. mešoviti puk) as part of the SFR Yugoslav Air Force.

== History ==
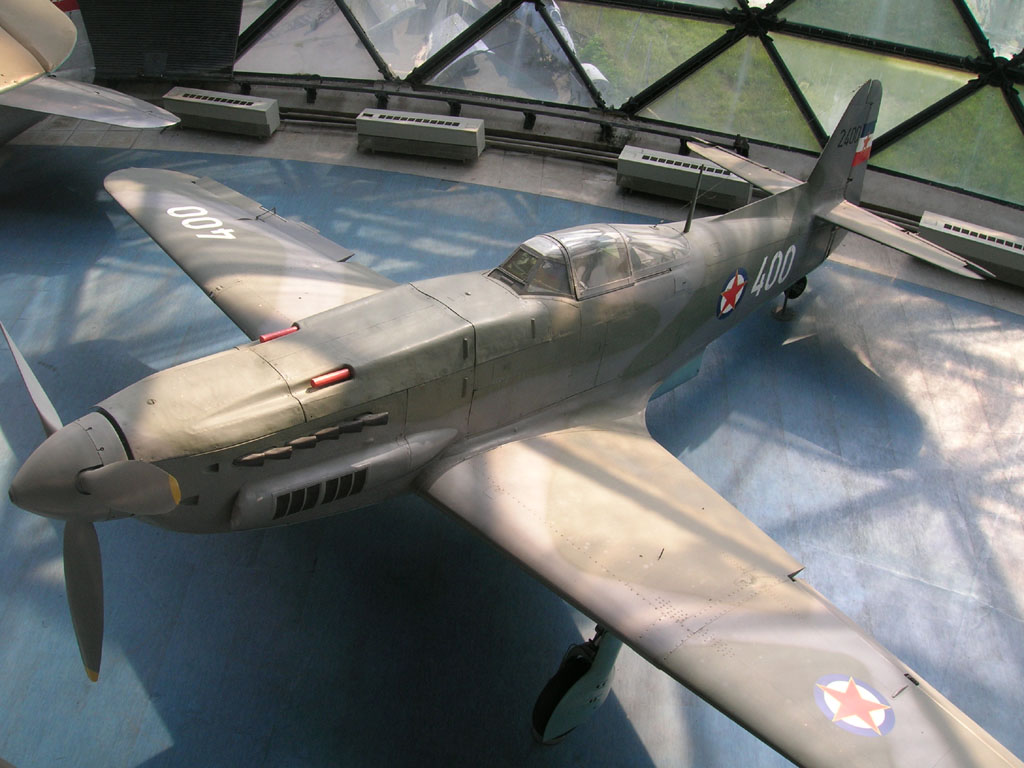
An Ikarus S-49C Yugoslav-made fighter which served in 185th Fighter Aviation Regiment from July 2, 1953, to 1955, now at Belgrade Aviation Museum

The 185th Mixed Aviation Regiment was formed on July 24, 1949, in Ljubljana. It was equipped with various Soviet and Yugoslav aircraft such as the Yak-3, Ilyushin Il-2, Pe-2, Ikarus Aero 2. By 1953, the regiment was located in Pula, where it remained for the longest period of its existence. That same year, it was rearmed with new domestic-made Ikarus S-49C fighter aircraft and become a Fighter Aviation Regiment. The regiment was renamed the Aviation Technical Group of the Aviation Training School in 1956 and re-equipped with various Yak-9 types. The following year, the first US-made F-84 Thunderjet and T-33 Shooting Star jets arrived.

The regiment was re-established as the 185th Training Aviation Regiment by 1960. In that period, F-86 Sabres were introduced into service, in 1964 it became a Fighter-Training/Fighter Regiment.

By 1961, with the application of the "Drvar" reorganization of the Air Force, a new type of designation system was used to identify the two squadrons in the regiment, which became the 129th Fighter Aviation and the 243rd Fighter-Bomber Aviation Squadrons.

By the end of the 1960s, all US jets had been replaced with new Yugoslav-made SOKO G-2 Galeb jet trainers; the unit was re-designated as a Fighter-Bomber Aviation Regiment. By 1975, 129 Squadron was renamed the 229th Fighter-Bomber Aviation Squadron, equipped with Galeb trainer aircraft. In 1978 243 Squadron became the 1st Fighter-Bomber Aviation Squadron, it was reassigned to the 'Center for training of pilots of foreign armed forces' at Mostar. 129 Squadron was issued MiG-21 fighters by 1982.

Training of 229 Squadron with a new type of jet trainer, the G-4 Super Galeb, began on December 3, 1984. The 185th Regiment and 229th Squadron were the first units of the Yugoslav Air Force to be equipped with Super Galeb trainers. Six G-4s from 229th Squadron demonstrated the new product of domestic aviation industries at the 1985 Victory Day parade.

The Regiment was active in combat operations in 1991 during the wars in Slovenia and Croatia. G-4s from 229th Squadron were tasked with attacking Slovenian Territorial Defence barricades on roads held by ground units of the Yugoslav People's Army.

On September 18 and 19, 1991 the Regiment withdrew from Pula military airport to Tuzla Air Base where it was disbanded from October 30. It's 129th Fighter Aviation Squadron remained at Tuzla and the 229th Fighter-Bomber Aviation Squadron re-located to Golubovci Air Base in Montenegro on October 10 where it was re-attached to the 172nd Aviation Brigade. 129th Squadron was later moved from Tuzla to Priština, where it was disbanded on May 12, 1992, with personnel and equipment being divided between the 83rd and 204th Fighter Aviation Regiments.

== Assignments ==
- Aviation Officers School (1949–1950)
- Aviation Officers College (1950–1955)
- Aviation Application School (1955–1956)
- Aviation Training School (1956–1960)
- Military Aviation Academy (1960–1991)

== Previous designations ==
- 185th Mixed Aviation Regiment (1949–1953)
- 185th Fighter Aviation Regiment (1953–1956)
- Aviation Technical Group of Aviation Training School (1956–1960)
- 185th Training Aviation Regiment (1960–1964)
- 185th Fighter-Training Regiment (1964–1966)
- 185th Fighter Aviation Regiment (1966–1969)
- 185th Fighter-Bomber Aviation Regiment (1969–1991)

== Organization ==
=== 1961–1969 ===
- 185th Training Aviation Regiment (Fighter-Training Regiment/Fighter Aviation Regiment)
  - 129th Fighter Aviation Squadron
  - 243rd Fighter-Bomber Aviation Squadron

=== 1982–1991 ===
- 185th Fighter-Bomber Aviation Regiment
  - 129th Fighter Aviation Squadron
  - 229th Fighter-Bomber Aviation Squadron

== Bases stationed ==
- Ljubljana (1949–1953)
- Pula (1953–1991)
- Tuzla (1991)

== Commanding officers ==
Date appointed	Name
	Luka Popov
	Džemal Bukovac
	Slobodan Alagic
	Albin Starc
	Milan Radojcic
	Ante Sardelic
	Danilo Perovic
	Nikola Benic
	Petar Stipancic
	Zvonko Jurjevic
	Marjan Rožic
	Safet Šehovic
	Marijan Vratovic

== Equipment ==
- Yakovlev Yak-3 (1949–1952)
- Ilyushin Il-2 (1949–1952)
- Petlyakov Pe-2 (1949–1952)
- Ikarus Aero 2B/C (1949–1952)
- Ikarus S-49C (1953–1956)
- Yakovlev Yak-9U (1953–1957)
- Yakovlev Yak-9/9P (1953–1957)
- F-84G Thunderjet (1956–1968)
- Lockheed T-33A Shooting Star (1956–1960)
- Lockheed TV-2 Shooting Star (1961–1968)
- UTVA Aero 3 (1958–1960)
- F-86E Sabre (1960–1968)
- G-2 Galeb (1968–1991)
- MiG-21PMF (1982–1991)
- MiG-21UM (1982–1991)
- G-4 Super Galeb (1984–1991)
