= Ikarus MM-2 =

1940 prototype aircraft

- Ikarus MM-2/(MIMA-2)

General information
- Type: Trainer aircraft
- National origin: Yugoslavia
- Manufacturer: Fabrika aero i hidroplana Ikarus A.D. Zemun - Belgrade
- Designer: Dragutin Milošević and Djordje Manojlović
- Status: inactive
- Primary user: Yugoslav Royal Air Force
- Number built: 1

History
- Introduction date: prototype
- First flight: December 1940
- Retired: 1942
- Developed from: Zmaj Fizir FN

The Ikarus MM-2 (Serbian Cyrillic:Икарус MM-2) was a 1940 prototype single engine low-wing monoplane advanced training aircraft featuring mixed (wood and metal) construction and retractable undercarriage produced at the Yugoslavian Ikarus factory.

== Design and development ==
The Ikarus MM-2 was developed as a replacement for the Zmaj Fizir FN, which had been the most commonly used training aircraft of the Yugoslav Royal Air Force up until 1941. This was result of the fact that in the mid thirties trainer airplanes in the Yugoslav Royal Air Force had their maximum speed of around 200 km/h and the modern combat planes are double faster.

In the 1936 Eng. Dragutin Milošević start in private to work on project of new advanced trainer for the Yugoslav Air Force. This first plane was marked as M-1, M coming from the last name of designer. Also at same time, was started project on two different basic training aircraft, low-wing Ikarus Aero 2 and Rogožarski Brucoš. Design had proposed inline Renault engine and pilots in tandem. Construction of the plane and geometry was modern, with low wing and retractable landing gear. His project under the designation M-1 declined to Headquarters Air Force because of the use of imported components (Reno was scheduled engine). During 1937 launched the redesign of the aircraft engine IAM local K-7 (license Gnôme-Rhône 7K) under the designation M-2, which was completed in mid-1939. In this reason, plane is now become shorter, wing retained the same and weight was raised for 60 kg. That same year, testing was completed in the Eiffel wind tunnel model, which confirmed all budgets. At the time he joined the project engineer major Djordje Manojlović who succeeded his connections to quickly accept the project. The project received MM-2 designation by the initials Milošević - Manojlović. Prototype is entrusted to the Ikarus who at that time working on three new projects (aircraft: Orkan, Aero-2 and B-5).

== Operational history ==
Ikarus” had taken the project for prototype manufacture and the project is released at March 25. 1940. The plane was completely finished in the November 1940. First flight test was made in December 1940 and test pilot was Vasilije Stojanovic. Total of 45 factory test flight was made with 20 flying hours made. Plane was very stable with very good handling characteristics. As the aircraft showed excellent properties, the Air Force Command had bought the prototype, which on 4 April 1941 flew in from Zemun in Kraljevo together with experiment group Yugoslav Royal Air Force. Armament should consist of two Darne 7,7 mm armament placed in the wing with total of 2175 rounds. On the lower fuselage could be attached bomb pylon with connection for four bombs cal. 10 kg. Front piece of fuselage was metal plate with rear part fabric covered. Wings are constructed of wing center section and outer wings. Center section was of completely metal construction with metal panels while outer wings are of wooden construction. Cockpit was enclosed. Electrical installation was 24 V and in the series manufacture was planned “Telefunken” Fu GVII radio station. Envisaged to release order of 50 planes but the beginning of the war thwarted these plans. Since the war began two days, the aircraft was captured intact the German army plane and September gave its allies in the Croatian army, which flew under the number 6301 to the courier business. It was destroyed during the fall when landing at the airport Rajlovac 13 May 1942 year. Aircraft was not renewed because the damage was a fall of 90%. Model aircraft and documentation is kept in the Yugoslav Museum of Aviation at the airport in Belgrade.

== Operators ==
Kingdom of Yugoslavia

- Royal Yugoslav Air Force 1 aircraft

Croatia

- Air Force of the Independent State of Croatia (1 ex-Royal Yugoslav Air Force example)

== Specifications ==
Data from :Avion MIMA-2 (II) Jewel of the pre-war Yugoslav aviation industry

General characteristics

- Crew: 2
- Length: 7.20 m (23 ft 7 in)
- Wingspan: 9.30 m (30 ft 6 in)
- Height: 2.89 m (9 ft 6 in)
- Wing area: 13.60 m^{2} (146.4 sq ft) swept
- Empty weight: 894 kg (1,971 lb)
- Max takeoff weight: 1,330 kg (2,932 lb)
- Fuel capacity: 160
- Powerplant: 1 × IAM, K-7(7-cylinder radial engine), 310 kW (420 hp)
- Propellers: 2-bladed

Performance

- Maximum speed: 400 km/h (250 mph, 220 kn) 400 at sea level
- Cruise speed: 304 km/h (189 mph, 164 kn)
- Minimum control speed: 98 km/h (61 mph, 53 kn)
- Range: 764 km (475 mi, 413 nmi)
- Service ceiling: 9,250 m (30,350 ft)
- Rate of climb: 12.3 m/s (2,420 ft/min)

== See also ==
- Ikarus IK-2, a Yugoslav high-wing, all-metal, single seat, monoplane fighter aircraft.
- Rogožarski IK-3, a Yugoslav single engine low-wing monoplane single-seat interceptor fighter.
- Zmaj Fizir FP-2, a Yugoslav single-engine, two-seater biplane
- Rogožarski R-100, a Yugoslav single-engined, single-seat parasol winged aircraft
- Rogožarski PVT, a Yugoslav single-engined, two-seat parasol winged aircraft

Related development

- Ikarus Aero 2
- Utva 213 Vihor
- Soko 522

Aircraft of comparable role, configuration, and era

- Nardi FN.305 (1937)
- Arado Ar 96 (1938)
- AT-6 Harvard (1938)

Related lists

- List of aircraft of World War II
- List of training aircraft
