= UTVA Aero 3 =

Aero 3
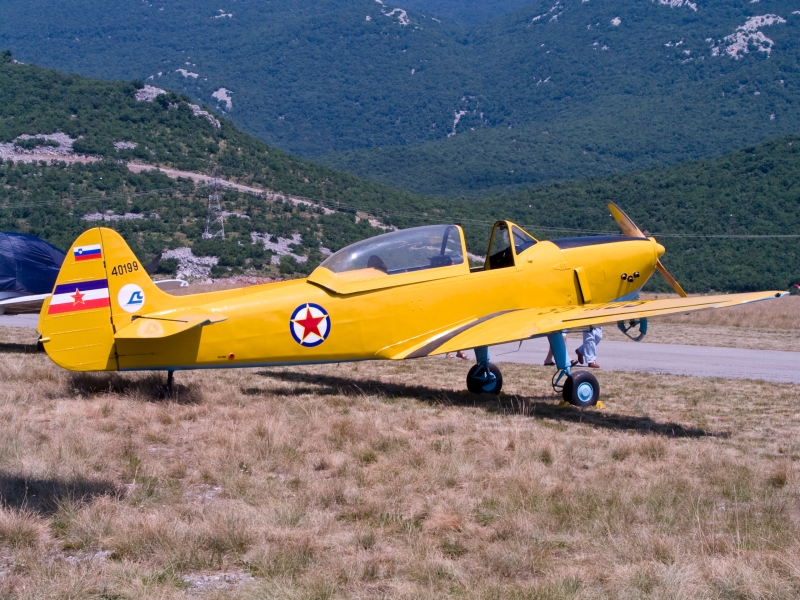
- Aero 3 - Letalski center Maribor

General information
- Type: Military trainer
- National origin: Yugoslavia
- Manufacturer: UTVA
- Primary user: Yugoslavia
- Number built: 110

History
- Introduction date: 1958
- First flight: August 1956

The UTVA Aero 3 was a piston-engined military trainer aircraft built in Yugoslavia to replace the Ikarus Aero 2 then in service. One hundred ten were built, in Yugoslav Air Force service from 1958 to mid-1970s. It was superseded by the UTVA 75.

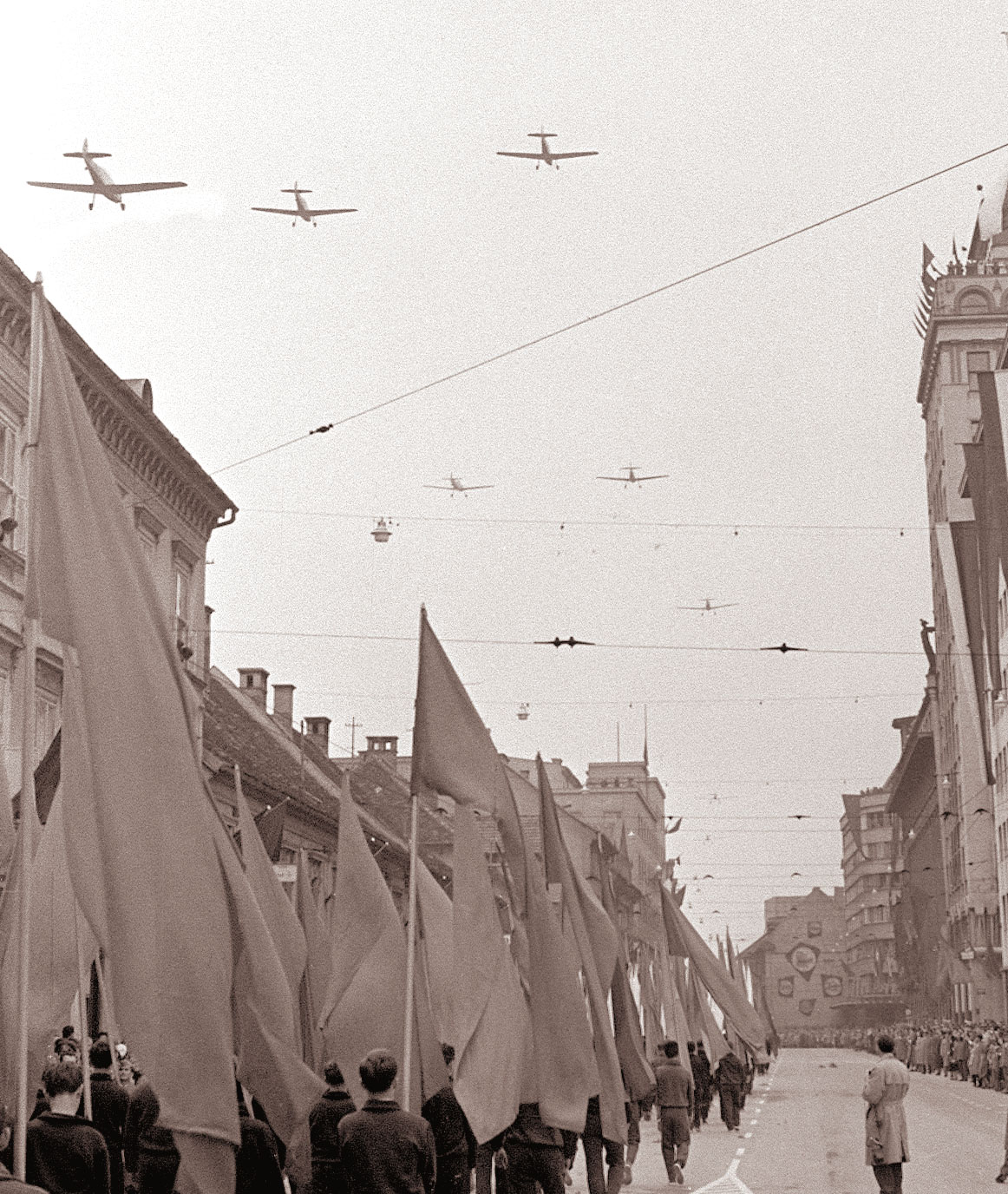
First May 1960 in Ljubljana Aero 2 and Aero 3 aircraft

== Design and development ==
First flown in 1956, the Aero 3 was designed to meet a Yugoslav Air Force requirement for a primary trainer that could also be used in the army co-operation role.

The Aero 3 was a low-wing cantilever monoplane that seated the student and instructor in tandem under a bubble canopy. Of all wood construction, it had a fixed, tailwheel landing gear and was powered by a nose-mounted 190 hp (142 kW) Lycoming O-435-A piston engine.

== Former military operators ==
- Yugoslavia
  - Yugoslav Air Force
    - Aviation Technical Group of Aviation Training School (1958–1960)
    - Light Combat Aviation Squadron of 3rd Air Command (1959-1961)
    - Light Combat Aviation Squadron of 5th Air Command (1959-1961)
    - Light Combat Aviation Squadron of 7th Air Command (1959-1961)
    - 463rd Light Combat Aviation Squadron (1961-1965)
    - 464th Light Combat Aviation Squadron (1961-1965)
    - 465th Light Combat Aviation Squadron (1961-1965)
  - Letalski center Maribor (Civil operator 1961-2011)

== Aircraft on display ==
Serbia

- Museum of Aviation (Belgrade) in Belgrade

A UTVA Aero 3 prototype and UTVa Aero 3 are on display

Croatia

- Nikola Tesla Technical Museum in Zagreb

A UTVA Areo 3 prototype ev. number: 40001 from 1954.

== Specifications ==
Data from

General characteristics

- Crew: 2 a teacher and student
- Capacity: 2
- Length: 8.58 m (28 ft 1 in)
- Wingspan: 10.5 m (34 ft 5 in)
- Height: 2.7 m (8 ft 10 in)
- Wing area: 18.9 m^{2} (203 sq ft)
- Gross weight: 1,198 kg (2,646 lb)
- Powerplant: 1 × Lycoming O-435-A piston engine , 142 kW (190 hp)

Performance

- Maximum speed: 230 km/h (143 mph, 124 kn)
- Cruise speed: 180 km/h (112 mph, 97 kn)
- Range: 680 km (422 mi, 367 nmi)
- Service ceiling: 4,300 m (14,100 ft)

== See also ==
Aircraft of comparable role, configuration, and era

- de Havilland Chipmunk
- Zlin Z-226
- PZL M-2
