= Libya–Yugoslavia relations =

Libya-Yugoslavia relations
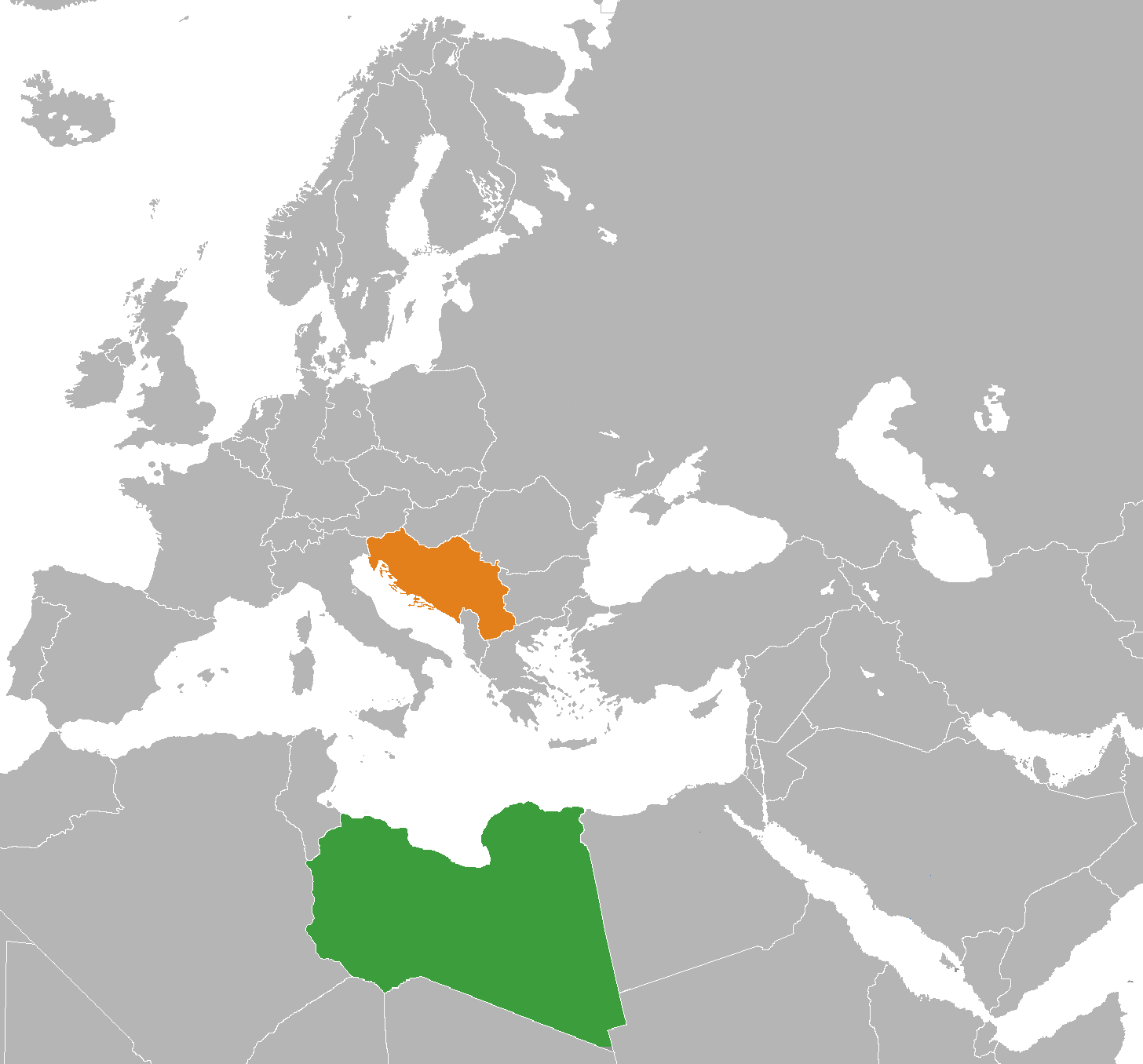

- Libya: Yugoslavia

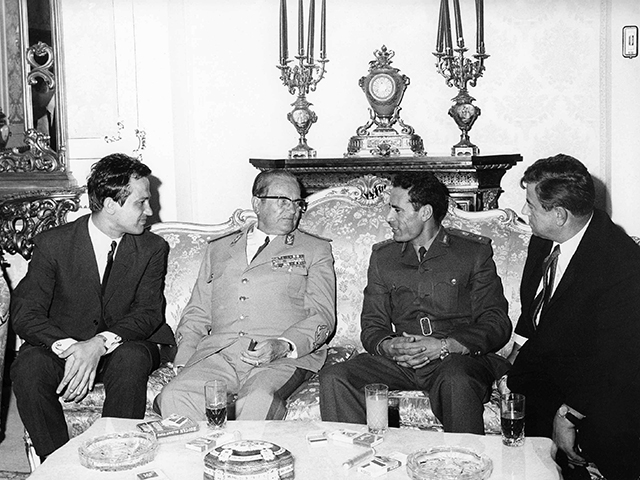
Josip Broz Tito and Muammar Gaddafi in Tripoli.

Libya–Yugoslavia relations were historical foreign relations between Libya and now split-up Socialist Federal Republic of Yugoslavia. Two countries established formal diplomatic relations in 1955.

During the Cold War both countries actively participated in the work of the Non-Aligned Movement. Within the movement Yugoslavia belonged to the movement's self-described core members which advocated for equidistance towards both blocs during the Cold War, while Libya often aligned itself to the group of self-described progressive members more aligned towards the Soviet Union. Despite this Yugoslavia advocated for close cooperation of Euro–Mediterranean members of the movement as the response to exclusive Asian–African or Tricontinental (Asia-Africa-Latin America) initiatives. Belgrade perceived them as the effort by Soviets to undermine and obscure Yugoslav and Mediterranean place within the movement.

President of Yugoslavia Josip Broz Tito officially visited Libya on three occasions in 1970, 1977 and 1979. King Idris of Libya visited Yugoslavia between 8–21 August 1969 while Colonel Muammar Gaddafi visited Yugoslavia during President Tito's lifetime in 1973, 1977 and 1978. Cordial relations between the two countries eventually evolved into a military trade in which Libya became a prime client for Yugoslav weapons and among other equipment bought 116 Yugoslav-made Galeb G-2 jet planes. Significant economic cooperation developed in other non-military fields with number of Yugoslav companies and workers working in Libya. Direct flights between Sarajevo–Belgrade–Tripoli run approximately 2 or 3 times per week. Despite being a European socialist state with the closest relations with the United States, Yugoslavia strongly condemned the 1986 United States bombing of Libya.

== See also ==
- Yugoslavia and the Non-Aligned Movement
- Yugoslavia and the Organisation of African Unity
- Death and state funeral of Josip Broz Tito
- Yugoslav Wars
- NATO bombing of Yugoslavia
- First Libyan Civil War
- 2011 military intervention in Libya
- Libya–Serbia relations
- Croatia–Libya relations
- Libyan dinar
- Yugoslav dinar
