= 104th Training Aviation Regiment =

104th Training Aviation Regiment: 104. vazduhoplovni školski puk
- Active: 1945 - 1959
- Disbanded: 1959-1960
- Country: Yugoslavia
- Branch: Yugoslav Air Force
- Part of: Military Aviation College; Active Aviation Officers School; Flight training center

The 104th Training Aviation Regiment (Serbo-Croatian: 104. vazduhoplovni školski puk / 104. ваздухопловни школски пук) was an aviation regiment established in 1945 as 1st Training Aviation Regiment (Serbo-Croatian: 1. vazduhoplovni školski puk / 1. ваздухопловни школски пук) as part of the SFR Yugoslav Air Force.

== History ==
=== 1st Training Aviation Regiment ===
The 1st Training Aviation Regiment was formed on November 1, 1945, by order from August of same year. It was created at Pančevo from training squadron, as part of Military Aviation College. It was equipped with Soviet-made Po-2 and UT-2 and Yugoslav Aero-2 training aircraft. By the May 1946 the regiment had composed from four squadrons, and by November same year number of squadrons was reduced.

By the 1948 year this regiment was renamed like all other units of Yugoslav Army, so it has become 104th Training Aviation Regiment.

The commanders of regiment in this period were Predrag Ilić and Svetislav Nešović. Commissars was Milan Jovanović.

=== 104th Training Aviation Regiment ===
The 104th Training Aviation Regiment was based at Pančevo airfield for short period. By year 1949 it was dislocated to Mostar airport, where it has remain until it was disbanded. It was equipped with Soviet Yakovlev trainer-fighters and domestic made trainers.

In year 1956 regiment was reformed in to 1st Pilot School, which existed until 1959/1960.

The commanders of regiment in this period were Svetislav Nešović, Mido Rakočević, Edo Banfić and Luka Popov.

== Assignments ==
- Military Aviation College (1945–1949)
- Active Aviation Officers School of Military Aviation Academy (1949–1952)
- Flight training center (1953–1960)

== Previous designations ==
- 1st Training Aviation Regiment (1945–1948)
- 104th Training Aviation Regiment (1948–1956)
- 1st Pilot School (1956–1960)

== Bases stationed ==
- Pančevo (1945–1949)
  - Kovin, Omoljica and Kačarevo (1946–1948)
- Mostar (1949–1960)

== Commanding officers ==
| Date appointed | Name |
|---|---|
| | Predrag Ilić |
| | Svetislav Nešović |
| | Mido Rakočević |
| | Edo Banfić |
| | Luka Popov |

== Equipment ==
- Yakovlev UT-2 (1945–1956)
- Po-2 (1945–1948)
- Ikarus Aero 2B/C (1945–1948)
- Yakovlev Yak-1 (1948–1950)
- Yakovlev Yak-9U (1948–1950)
- Yugoslav-made trainer aircraft (1948–1960)
