= 463rd Light Combat Aviation Squadron =

463rd Light Combat Aviation Squadron: 463. eskadrila lake borbene avijacije
- Active: 1961 – 1966
- Disbanded: 1966
- Country: Yugoslavia
- Branch: Yugoslav Air Force
- Type: Squadron
- Role: Training; Light Combat
- Part of: 105th Training Aviation Regiment

The 463rd Light Combat Aviation Squadron (Serbo-Croatian: 463. eskadrila lake borbene avijacije / 463. ескадрила лаке борбене авијације) was an aviation squadron of Yugoslav Air Force formed in April 1961 at Titograd airfield as part of 105th Training Aviation Regiment. It moved to Zadar military airport Zemunik later the same year.

It was equipped with domestic training Aero-3 and Soko 522 aircraft.

In 1966 it has been disbanded due to the transformation of 105th Regiment. New domestic made G-2 Galeb trainer jet aircraft have replaced Aero-3 and Soko 522 piston-engine trainers of 105th Regiment in 1966, and all its three squadrons, 463rd, 464th and 465th Light Combat Aviation Squadron, have been reorganized into two new squadrons − 249th and 251st Fighter-Bomber Aviation Squadron.

== Assignments ==
- 105th Training Aviation Regiment (1961−1966)

== Bases stationed ==
- Titograd (1961)
- Zemunik (1961−1966)

== Equipment ==
- Utva Aero-3 (1961−1965)
- Soko 522 (1961–1966)
