= 462nd Light Combat Aviation Squadron =

462nd Light Combat Aviation Squadron: 462. eskadrila lake borbene avijacije
- Active: 1953 – 1968; 1973 - 1988
- Disbanded: 1968; 1988
- Country: Yugoslavia
- Branch: Yugoslav Air Force
- Type: Squadron
- Role: Training; Light Combat
- Part of: Military Aviation Academy
- Garrison/HQ: Tuzla Air Base

The 462nd Light Combat Aviation Squadron (Serbo-Croatian: 462. eskadrila lake borbene avijacije / 462. ескадрила лаке борбене авијације) was an aviation squadron of Yugoslav Air Force formed in 1953 at Rajlovac airfield as Training Squadron of 37th Aviation Division (Serbo-Croatian: Trenažna eskadrila 37. vazduhoplovne divizije / Тренажна ескадрила 37. ваздухопловне дивизије).

== History ==
Squadron was part of 29th Aviation Division. It was equipped with US-made F-47D Thunderbolt fighter-bombers and Yugoslav-made Ikarus 213 trainers.

In 1959 due to the Drvar reorganization this squadron became the Light Combat Aviation Squadron of 7th Air Command (Serbo-Croatian: Vazduhoplovna eskadrila lake borbene avijacije 7. vazduhoplovne komande / Ваздухопловна ескадрила лаке борбене авијације 7. ваздухопловне команде).

Squadron was again renamed and renumbered in April 1961 as 462nd Light Combat Aviation Squadron, being dislocated to Tuzla military airport. In same year new Soko 522 trainer aircraft have been introduced replacing older Thunderbolts and 213 aircraft. By order from October 24, 1968, it has been disbanded. It was reestablished by order from March 7, 1973, at Tuzla airfield as part of Military Aviation Academy. Soko 522 trainers were replaced with Utva 66 liaison aircraft and Soko J-20 Kraguj counter-insurgency aircraft during the 1976 and 1977. Squadron was mainly used for training of School of Reserve Officers of Aviation.

In 1986 by order from February 28 squadron supposed to be transformed into 253rd Fighter-Bomber Aviation Squadron of 701st Aviation Brigade, but that was change was never performed.

462nd Squadron has been disbanded by September, 1988 after completion of training of 39th class of School of Reserve Officers of Aviation.

== Assignments ==
- 37th Aviation Division (1953–1959)
- 7th Air Command (1959–1964)
- 103rd Reconnaissance Aviation Regiment (1965-1966)
- 98th Aviation Brigade (1964-1968)
- Military Aviation Academy (1973-1988)

== Previous designations ==
- Training Squadron of 37th Aviation Division (1953-1959)
- Light Combat Aviation Squadron of 7th Air Command (1959–1961)
- 462nd Light Combat Aviation Squadron (1961–1968, 1973-1988)

== Bases stationed ==
- Rajlovac (1953–1961)
- Tuzla (1961–1968, 1973-1988)

== Equipment ==
- F-47D Thunderbolt (1953-1961)
- Ikarus 213 (1953–1961)
- Soko 522 (1961-1968, 1973-1977)
- Soko J-20 Kraguj (1976-1988)
- Utva 66 (1977-1988)
