= Croatia–Libya relations =

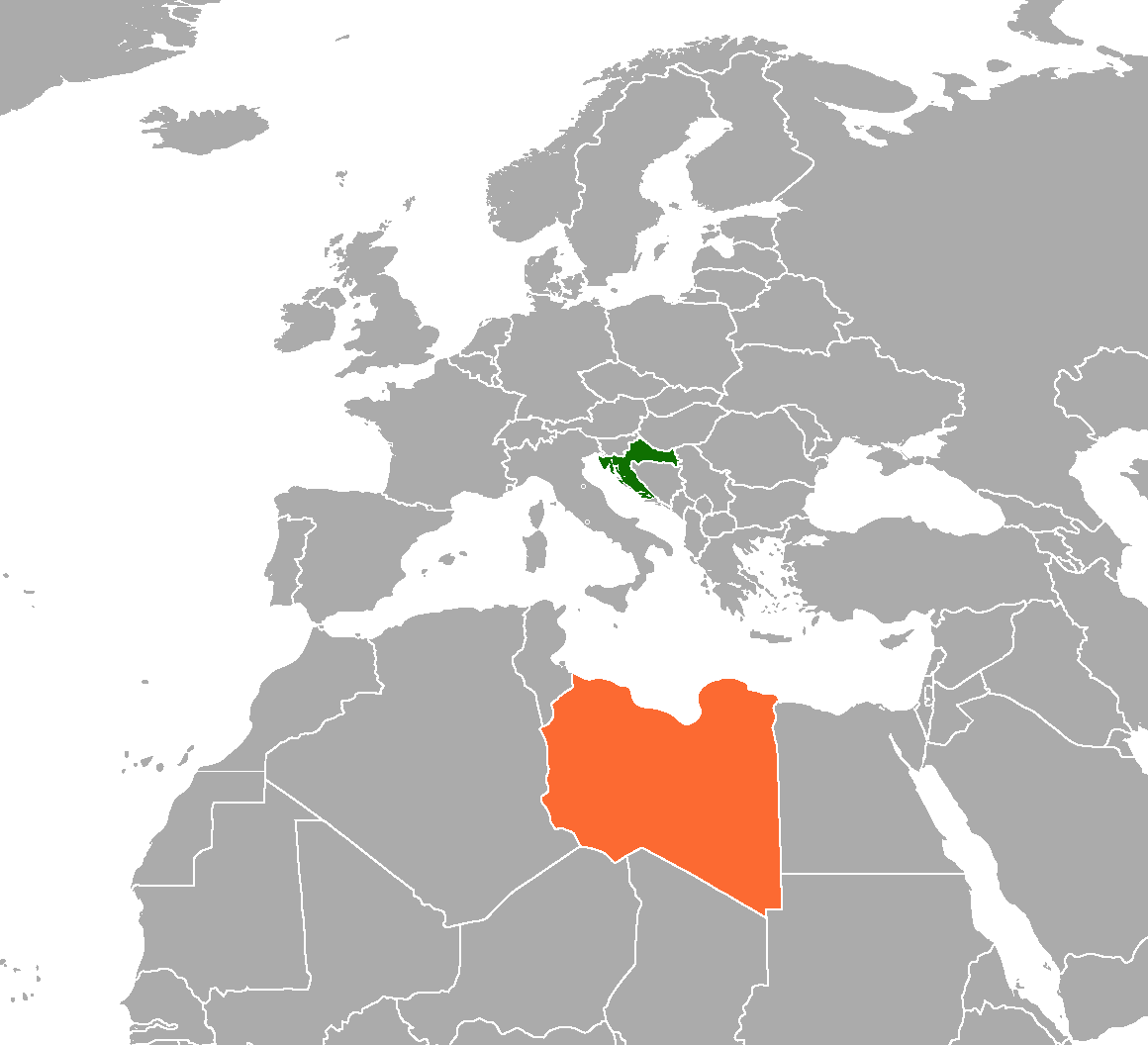

- Croatia: Libya

Diplomatic relations between Croatia and Libya were established on March 30, 2000. Croatia has an embassy in Tripoli (temporarily closed as of March 2011). Libya has an embassy in Zagreb.

The Socialist Federal Republic of Yugoslavia, of which Croatia was a part of, maintained good relations with Libya under Muammar Gaddafi. Gaddafi came to Yugoslavia in 1989 for the 9th Summit of the Non-Aligned Movement.

Both countries are full members of the Union for the Mediterranean. Croatian president Stjepan Mesić made a state visit to Libya in 2003, as well as a three-day visit in February, 2008; he had previously made a visit to Libya in 1992. Croatian Prime Minister Jadranka Kosor visited Libya in September 2010.

President Mesić maintained good relations with Libyan leader Muammar Gaddafi, and as the 2011 Libyan civil war was starting in February 2011, he publicly stated he doubted that "his friend" Gaddafi himself had ordered shooting at the demonstrators, and would not postpone visit plans. Over 400 Croatian citizens were evacuated from the country by early March. The Croatian Government supported the 2011 military intervention in Libya that started in late March, and temporarily closed the Tripoli embassy at the same time. Mesić later made statements indicating suspicion NATO's motives in establishing the no-fly zone, which in turn angered the Ministry of Foreign Affairs. In late May, a Libyan diplomat in Zagreb made public statements supporting the Gaddafi regime and criticized Croatia for supporting the United Nations Security Council Resolution 1973. The Croatian Ministry of Foreign Affairs in turn revoked his diplomatic status. In late June, Croatia officially extended diplomatic recognition to the National Transitional Council of Libya.

== See also ==
- Foreign relations of Croatia
- Foreign relations of Libya
- Libya–Yugoslavia relations
- Yugoslavia and the Non-Aligned Movement
- Yugoslavia and the Organisation of African Unity
