= Liaison Squadron of 7th Aviation Corps =

Liaison Squadron of 7th Aviation Corps Eskadrila za vezu 7. vazduhoplovnog korpusa
- Active: 1953 – after 1959
- Disbanded: after 1956
- Country: Yugoslavia
- Branch: Yugoslav Air Force
- Type: Squadron
- Role: Liaison
- Part of: 7th Aviation Corps
- Garrison/HQ: Batajnica

The Liaison Squadron of 7th Aviation Corps (Serbo-Croatian: Eskadrila za vezu 7. vazduhoplovnog korpusa / Ескадрила за везу 7. ваздухопловног корпуса) was an aviation squadron of the Yugoslav Air Force formed in 1953 at Batajnica airfield.

The squadron was part of 7th Aviation Corps. It was equipped with various aircraft. The squadron was disbanded after 1956, estimated 1959.

== Equipment ==
- Ikarus Aero 2B/C
- Zlin 381
