= Libya–Serbia relations =

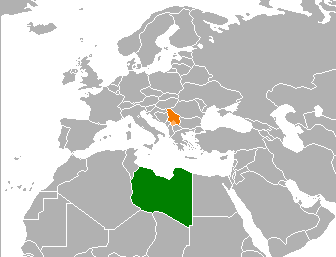

- Libya: Serbia

Libya and Serbia maintain diplomatic relations established between Angola and SFR Yugoslavia in 1955, following Libya's independence. From 1955 to 2006, Libya maintained relations with the Socialist Federal Republic of Yugoslavia (SFRY) and the Federal Republic of Yugoslavia (FRY) (later Serbia and Montenegro), of which Serbia is considered shared (SFRY) or sole (FRY) legal successor.

== History ==
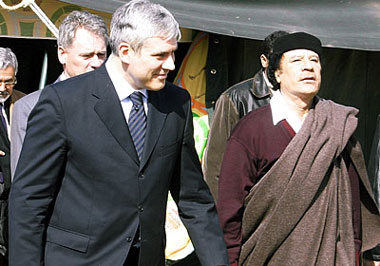
President of Serbia Boris Tadić with Muammar Gaddafi, 2006

Muammar Gaddafi built a strong diplomatic relationship with Yugoslavia and then maintained it with Serbia.

One of the more important connections was the arms trade, first between the Socialist Federal Republic of Yugoslavia and Libya, and then continuing with Serbia after the breakup of Yugoslavia. Several aircraft of the Libyan Jamahiriyan Air Force which were captured or used to defend Gaddafi-loyalists were made by Yugoslav aircraft-manufacturer SOKO in present-day Bosnia and Herzegovina. Muammar Gaddafi maintained strong diplomatic with Serbia after Yugoslavia broke up in 1991-1995. Public opinion in Serbia has been cited to be supportive of the Muammar Gaddafi regime.

On August 25, 2011, Serbia officially recognized the National Transitional Council as the ruling government in Libya. However, the relations with the transitional government were strained from the very beginning of the Libyan Civil War when five Serbs were captured by Anti-Gaddafi rebels under the suspicion that they fought as mercenaries for Muammar Gaddafi. Libya al Youm then reported that more mercenaries had been flown in from Banja Luka. The Serbian Minister of Defence, Dragan Šutanovac, denied reports that Serbian warplanes had bombed anti-Qaddafi protestors.

On 7 November 2015 two Serbian embassy workers in Libya were kidnapped by an unknown group, as reported by the Ministry of Foreign Affairs of Serbia.

== Resident diplomatic missions ==
- Libya has an embassy in Belgrade.
- Serbia has an embassy in Tripoli.

== See also ==
- Foreign relations of Libya
- Foreign relations of Serbia
- Libya–Yugoslavia relations
- Yugoslavia and the Non-Aligned Movement
- Yugoslavia and the Organisation of African Unity
