= Utva 213 Vihor =

1940s Yugoslavian trainer aircraft

Vihor
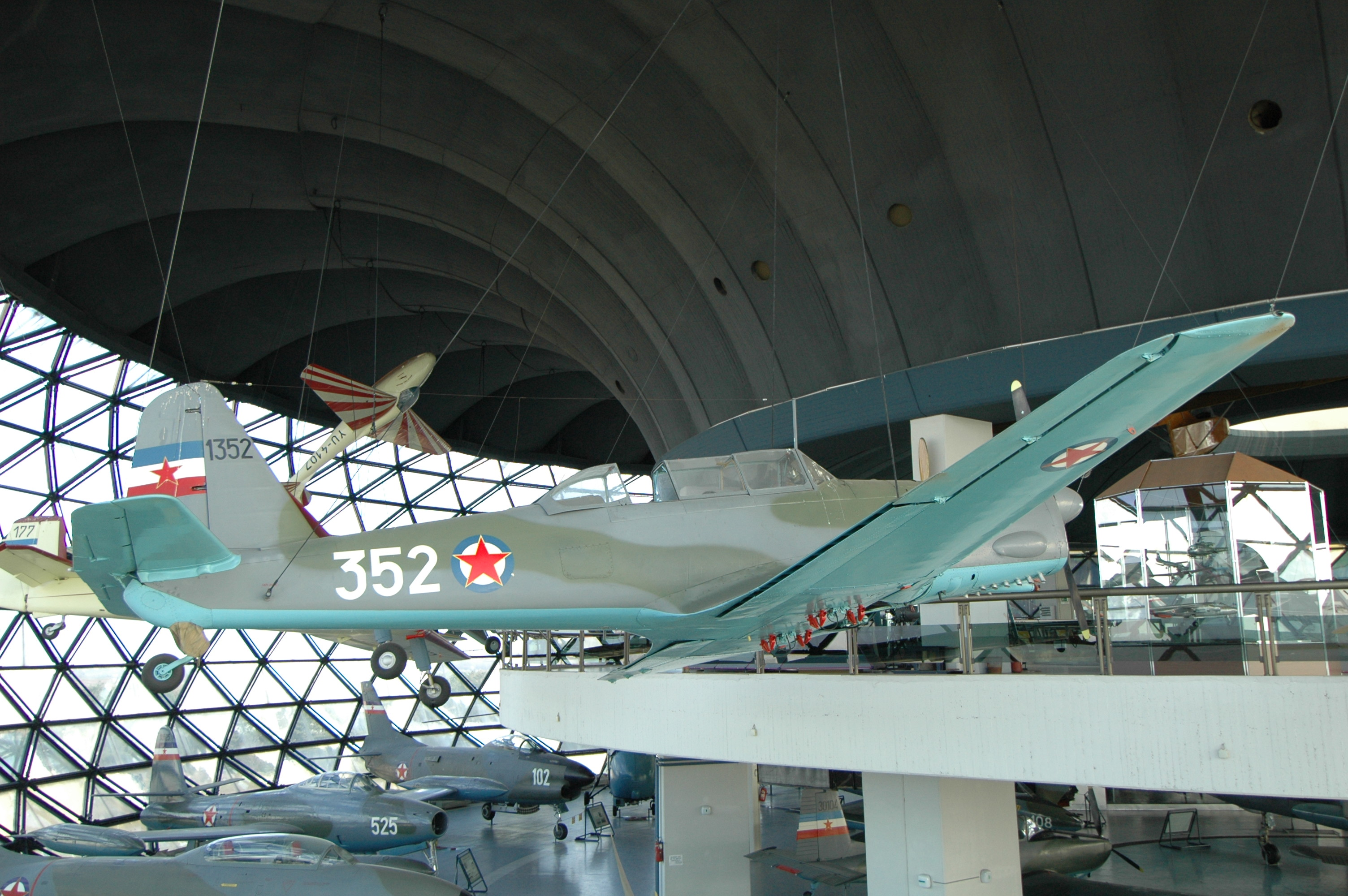

General information
- Type: Advanced military trainer
- National origin: FPR Yugoslavia
- Designer: Government Factories
- Primary user: Yugoslav Air Force
- Number built: 196

History
- Manufactured: 1952-54
- Introduction date: 1952
- First flight: 1949
- Retired: 1961
- Developed into: Soko 522

Utva 213 Vihor was a late 1940s Yugoslavian two-seat advanced trainer.

== Design and development ==
Designed and built by the Yugoslav state factory, the Type 213 was first flown in 1949, a cantilever low-wing monoplane powered by a 520 hp (388 kW) Ranger SVG-770-CB1 engine. The prototype had a conventional landing gear which retracted forward, the second prototype and production aircraft had a wider track main gear that retracted inwards. It had an enclosed cockpit for the instructor and student in tandem under a long glazed canopy. For training the Vihor had two forward-facing machine guns and could carry up to 100 kg of bombs. In 1957 an improved radial engined variant entered service as the Type 522.

== Aircraft on display ==
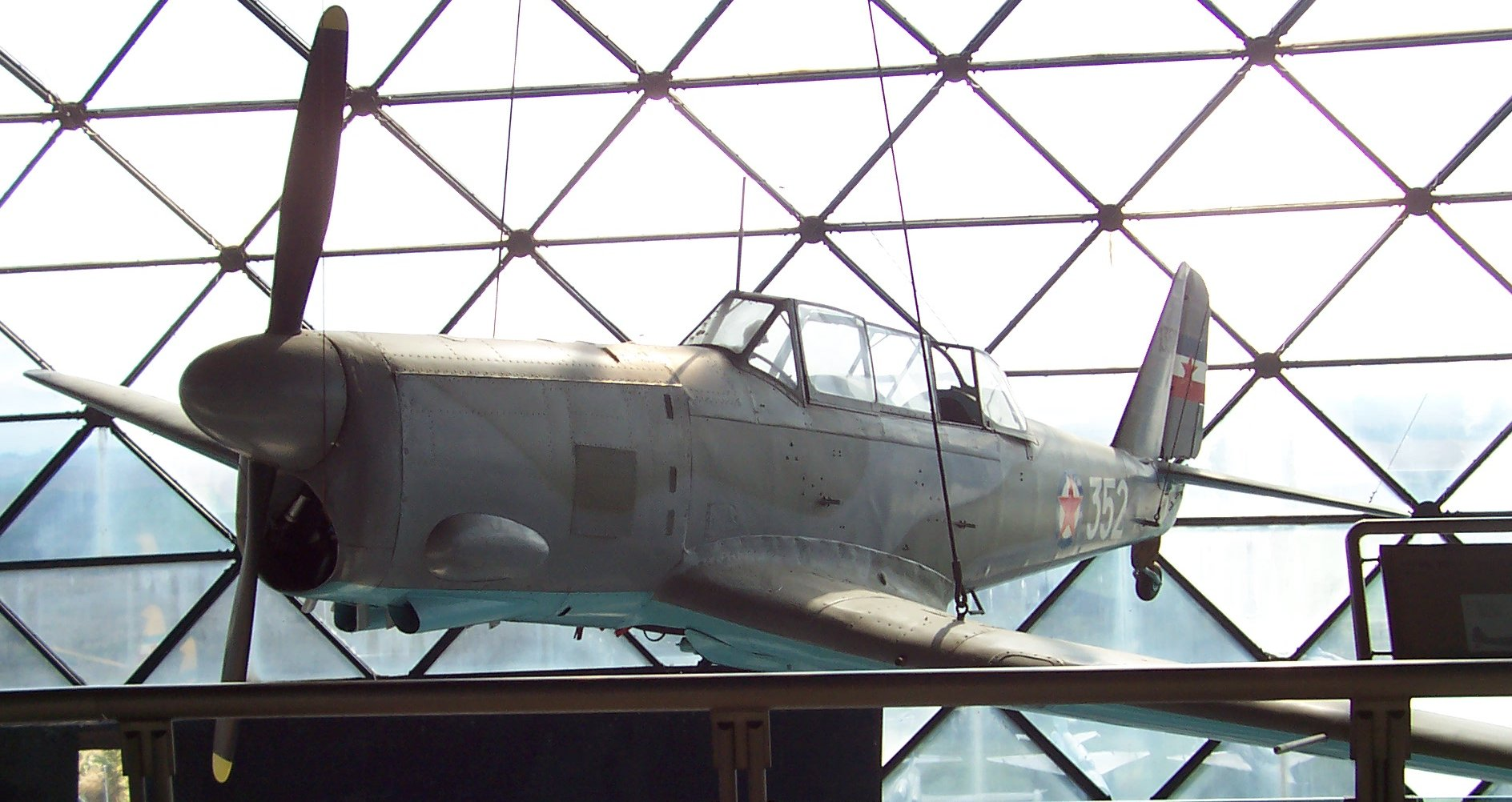
Vihor on display at the Museum of Yugoslav Aviation

One aircraft is on display at the Museum of Yugoslav Aviation, Belgrade, Serbia.

== Specifications ==
Data from Jane's All The World's Aircraft 1956–57

General characteristics

- Crew: 2
- Length: 11.52 m (37 ft 10 in)
- Wingspan: 11.0 m (36 ft 1 in)
- Height: 3.58 m (11 ft 9 in)
- Gross weight: 2,300 kg (5,071 lb)
- Powerplant: 1 × Ranger SVG-770C-1B air-cooled inverted V12 engine, 390 kW (520 hp)

Performance

- Maximum speed: 362 km/h (225 mph, 195 kn)
- Stall speed: 118 km/h (73 mph, 64 kn)
- Service ceiling: 7,000 m (23,000 ft)

Armament

- Guns: 2× machine guns
- Bombs: 2× 50 kg (110 lb) or 4× 25 kg (55 lb) bombs

== See also ==
Related development

- Soko 522
