= Kovin Air Base =

- IATA: none; ICAO: none

Summary
- Airport type: Military air base
- Owner: Ministry of Defence of Serbia
- Operator: Serbian Air Force and Air Defence
- Location: Kovin, Serbia
- Elevation AMSL: 280 ft (85 m)
- Coordinates: 44°46′28″N 020°57′41″E

Map
- Location within Serbia

Runways
Direction	Length		Surface
Direction	m	ft	Surface
13R/31L	2,184	7,165	Asphalt
13L/31R	2,000	6,562	Grass

Kovin Air Base (Serbian: Војни аеродром Кoвин / Vojni aerodrom Kovin) is a military air base in Kovin, Serbia, situated 45 km (28 mi) east of Belgrade. It is a military air base used by the Serbian Air Force and Air Defence. In 1998, a Jat Airways McDonnell Douglas DC-9-32 plane successfully made a forced landing at Kovin Air Base.

== See also ==
- List of airports in Serbia
