= Ikarus Aero 2 =

Aero 2
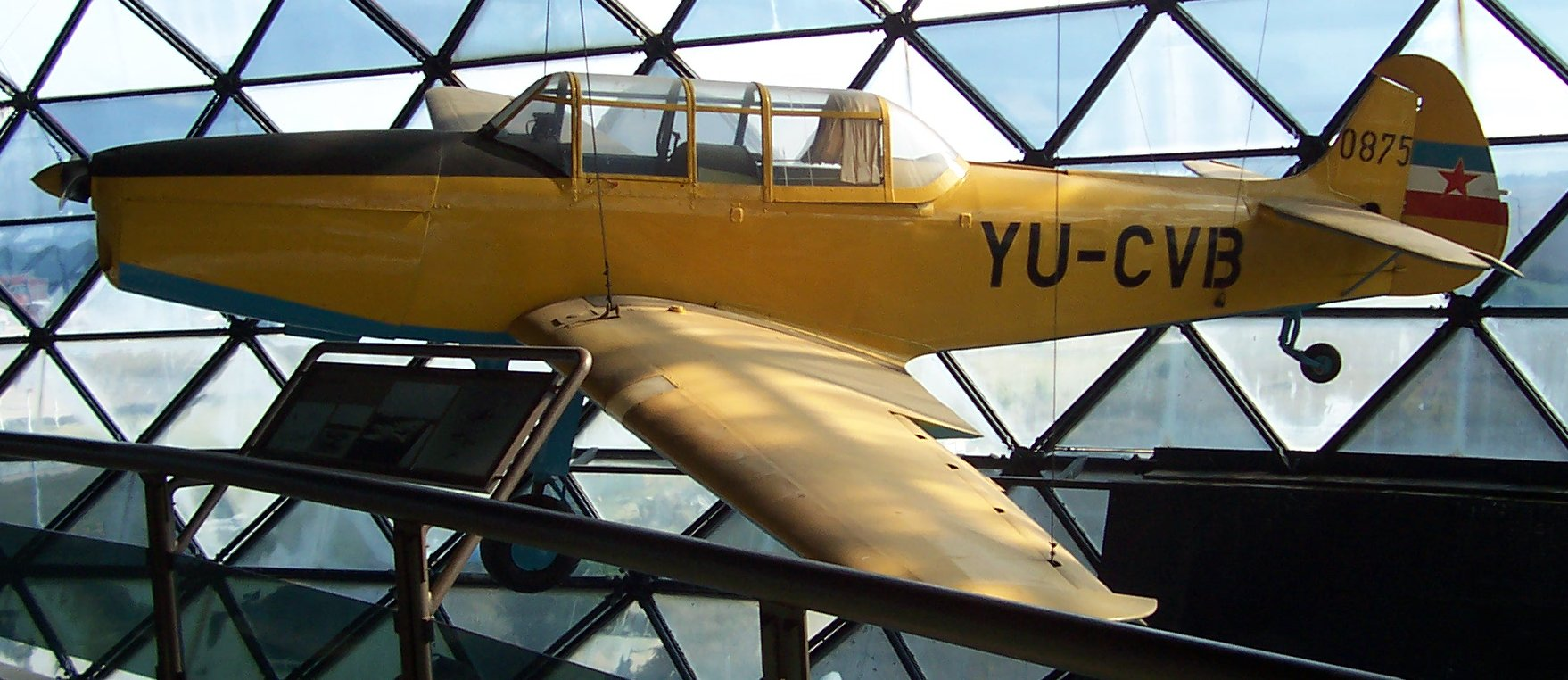
- Aero 2D on display at the Belgrade Aviation Museum

General information
- Type: Primary trainer
- National origin: Yugoslavia
- Manufacturer: Ikarus
- Primary user: Yugoslav Air Force
- Number built: 248

History
- Introduction date: 1948
- First flight: 1940
- Retired: 1959

The Ikarus Aero 2 was a piston-engined military trainer aircraft built in Yugoslavia in the years following World War II, although the design pre-dated the war.

== Design and development ==
The Ikarus Aero-2 was developed as a replacement for the Zmaj Fizir FN, which had been the most commonly used training aircraft of the Yugoslav Royal Air Force up until 1941. The Ikarus Aero-2 was designed by Boris Cijan and Đorđe Petković. Also at same time, was started project on two different aircraft, low-wing Ikarus MM-2 for advanced train and low-wing Rogožarski Brucoš for basic train. First flight test was made on April 20, 1940 and test pilot was Vasilije Stojanovic. 248 plane were eventually built, serving from 1948 to 1959 (380 built according to.

Powerplant was to be the de Havilland Gipsy Major because of its successful use in similar trainer aircraft built in other countries. The Aero 2 was a low-wing monoplane that seated the student and instructor in tandem, open cockpits (although later versions added a canopy to enclose them). Undercarriage was fixed and used a tailskid.

== Variants ==
Aero 2B
Open cockpit version with a 145hp (108kW) de Havilland Gipsy Major engine.
Aero 2BE
Enclosed cockpit version with a 145hp (108kW) de Havilland Gipsy Major engine.
Aero 2C
Open cockpit version with a 160hp (119kW) Walter Minor 6-III engine.
Aero 2D
Enclosed cockpit version with a 160hp (119kW) Walter Minor 6-III engine.
Aero 2E
Enclosed cockpit version with a 160hp (119kW) Walter Minor 6-III engine.
Aero 2F
Open cockpit version with a 160hp (119kW) Walter Minor 6-III engine.
Aero 2H
Twin-float version with a 160hp (119kW) Walter Minor 6-III engine.

== Operators ==
Yugoslavia

- Yugoslavian Air Force
  - 1st Training Aviation Regiment (1945–1948)
  - 3rd Training Aviation Regiment (1946–1948)
  - 103rd Reconnaissance Aviation Regiment (1949–1951)
  - 105th Training Aviation Regiment (1948−1949, 1951−1959)
  - 267th Aviation Regiment of School of Reserve Officers (1951–1953)
  - 122nd Hydroplane Liaison Squadron (1949–1959)
  - Training Squadron of 29th Aviation Division (1953–1961)
  - Training Squadron of 39th Aviation Division (1956–1959)
  - Training Squadron of 44th Aviation Division (1956–1961)
  - Liaison Squadron of 7th Aviation Corps (1953–1956)
- Letalski center Maribor

== Specifications (2B) ==
Data from The Illustrated Encyclopedia of Aircraft

General characteristics

- Crew: 1
- Capacity: 1
- Length: 8.45 m (27 ft 8.75 in)
- Wingspan: 10.5 m (34 ft 5.25 in)
- Height: 2.80 m (8 ft 10.25 in)
- Wing area: 17.4 m^{2} (187 sq ft)
- Empty weight: 564 kg (1,241 lb)
- Gross weight: 996 kg (2,196 lb)
- Powerplant: 1 × de Havilland Gipsy Major , 108 kW (145 hp)

Performance

- Maximum speed: 208 km/h (129 mph, 112 kn)
- Range: 680 km (423 mi, 368 nmi)
- Service ceiling: 4,500 m (14,765 ft)

== See also ==
Aircraft of comparable role, configuration, and era

- Miles Magister
- RWD-23
