= Soko 522 =

1950s Yugoslavian trainer/light attack aircraft

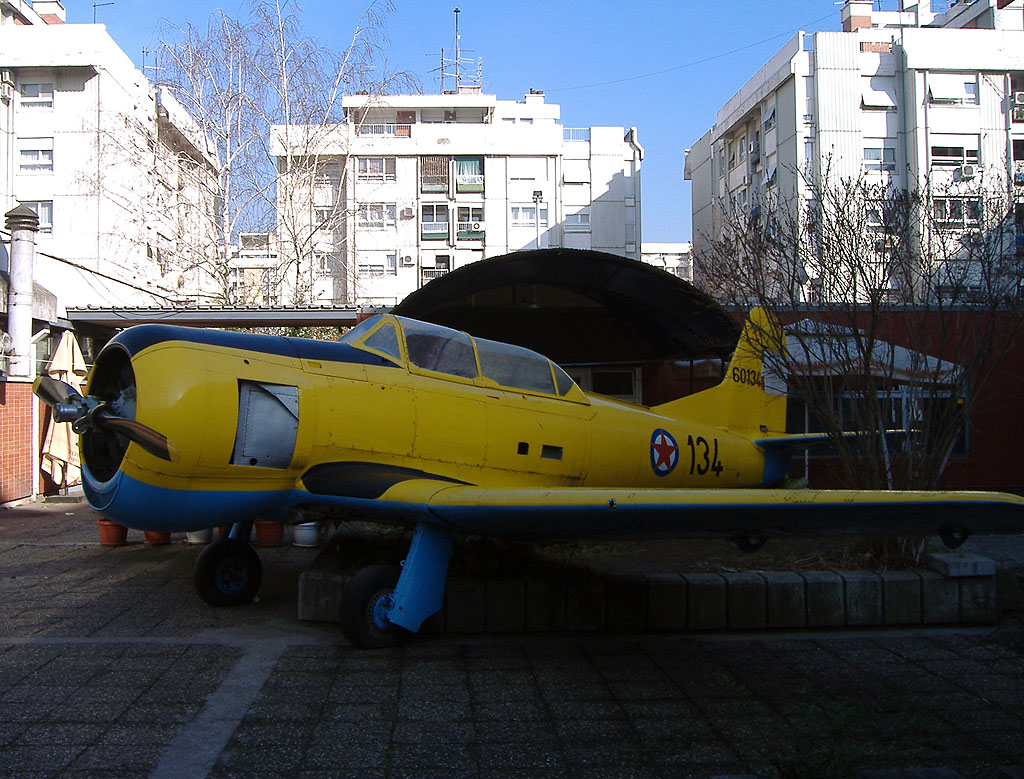

General information
- Type: Training and light attack aircraft
- Manufacturer: SOKO
- Designer: Šostarić, Marjanović and Čurčić
- Primary user: Yugoslav Air Force
- Number built: approx. 110

History
- Introduction date: 1955
- First flight: February 1955
- Retired: 1978

The Soko 522 was a two-seater Yugoslav military training and light attack aircraft produced in the 1950s by SOKO in Yugoslavia.

== History ==
The Soko 522 was designed by Yugoslav engineers Šostarić, Marjanović and Čurčić at the Ikarus Aircraft Factory in Zemun. The first prototype flew in February 1955. After the initial success of the new aircraft, production was transferred to the Soko aircraft factory in Mostar. Production lasted until 1961 and totalled 110 units. The Soko 522 was used as the primary trainer aircraft for the Yugoslav air force until it was retired in 1978.

It gained some fame for its role in war movies filmed in Yugoslavia during the 1960s and 1970s, where it was used to portray the Fw 190 German fighter. Some of its prominent movie roles were in the Yugoslav Oscar candidate Battle of Neretva and Kelly's Heroes, starring Clint Eastwood.

== Operators ==
Yugoslavia

- Yugoslav Air Force
  - 460th Light Combat Aviation Squadron (1961–1967)
  - 461st Light Combat Aviation Squadron (1961–1968, 1973–1977)
  - 462nd Light Combat Aviation Squadron (1961–1968, 1973–1977)
  - 463rd Light Combat Aviation Squadron (1961–1966)
  - 464th Light Combat Aviation Squadron (1961–1966)
  - 465th Light Combat Aviation Squadron (1961–1966)

== Surviving aircraft ==
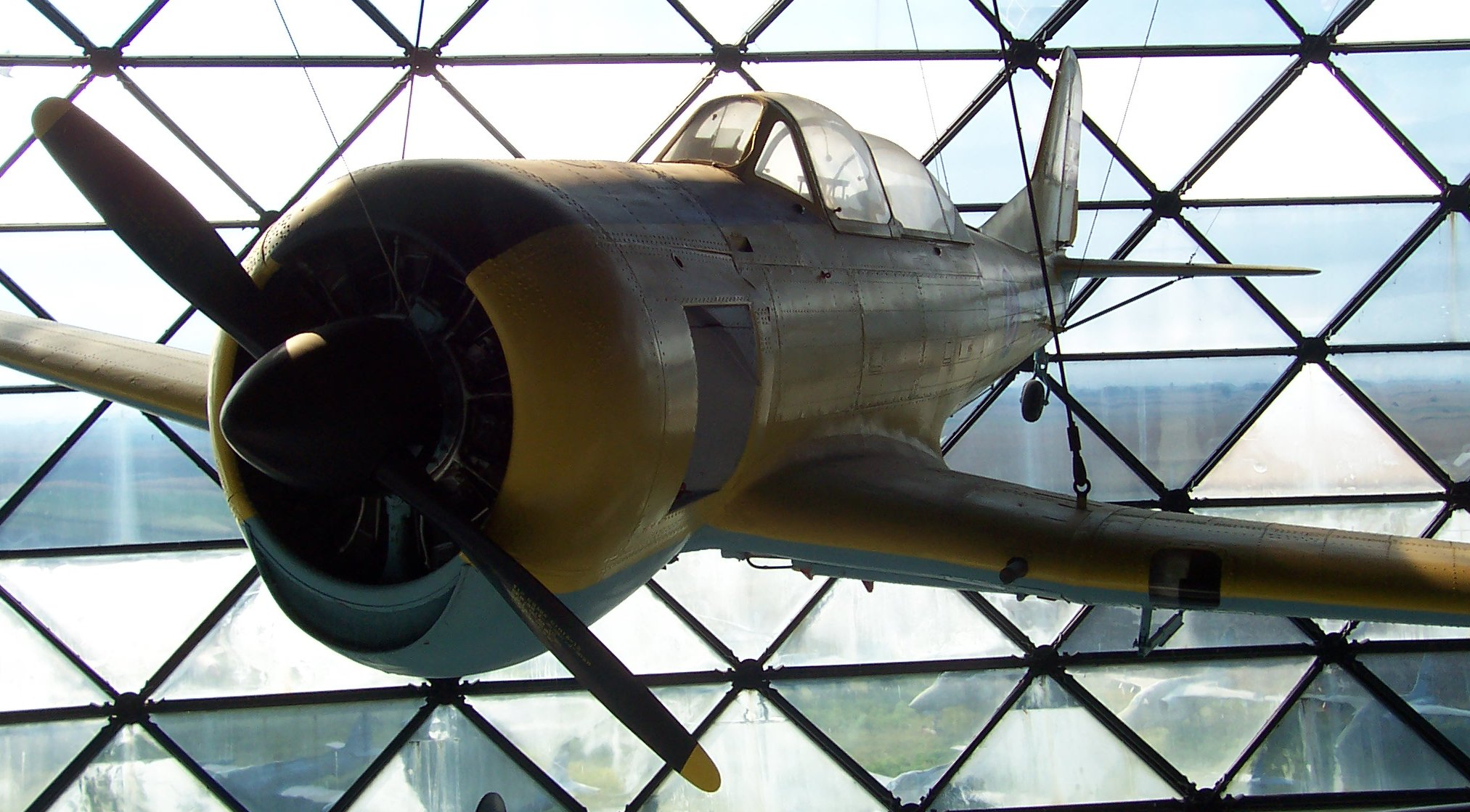
A preserved Soko 522 exhibited at the Museum of Aviation in Belgrade.

France

- 60168 – Soko 522 airworthy.

Serbia

- 60132 – Soko 522 on static display at the Museum of Aviation in Belgrade.
- 60157 – Soko 522 on static display at the Museum of Aviation in Belgrade.
- 60204 – Soko 522 on static display at the Museum of Aviation in Belgrade.
- ????? Soko 522 on static display in park at Tovariševo

Bosnia and Herzegovina

- 60143 – Soko 522 on static display at Mostar Airport in Mostar, Herzegovina-Neretva.

Slovenia

- Soko 522 on static display at the Pivka Park of Military History in Pivka.

United States

- Soko 522 owned by John Magoffin in Tucson, Arizona. It was damaged in a wheels up landing.

== Specifications (Soko 522) ==
Data from Jane's All The World's Aircraft 1961–62

General characteristics

- Crew: 2
- Length: 9.20 m (30 ft 2 in)
- Wingspan: 11.00 m (36 ft 1 in)
- Height: 3.58 m (11 ft 9 in)
- Gross weight: 1,089 kg (2,400 lb)
- Powerplant: 1 × Pratt & Whitney R-1340-AN-1 Wasp air-cooled radial engine, 450 kW (600 hp)

Performance

- Maximum speed: 351 km/h (218 mph, 190 kn)
- Range: 978 km (608 mi, 528 nmi)
- Service ceiling: 7,000 m (23,000 ft)

Armament
Avionics
radio AN-ARC-3, VKT 100-156 MHz range 45 km at 1000 ft, 200 km at 10,000 ft
radiocompass AN-ARN-6 100-1750 kHz or AD-722

== See also ==
Aircraft of comparable role, configuration, and era

- Yakovlev Yak-11
