= Soko G-2 Galeb =

Jet trainer in Yugoslavia

G-2 Galeb
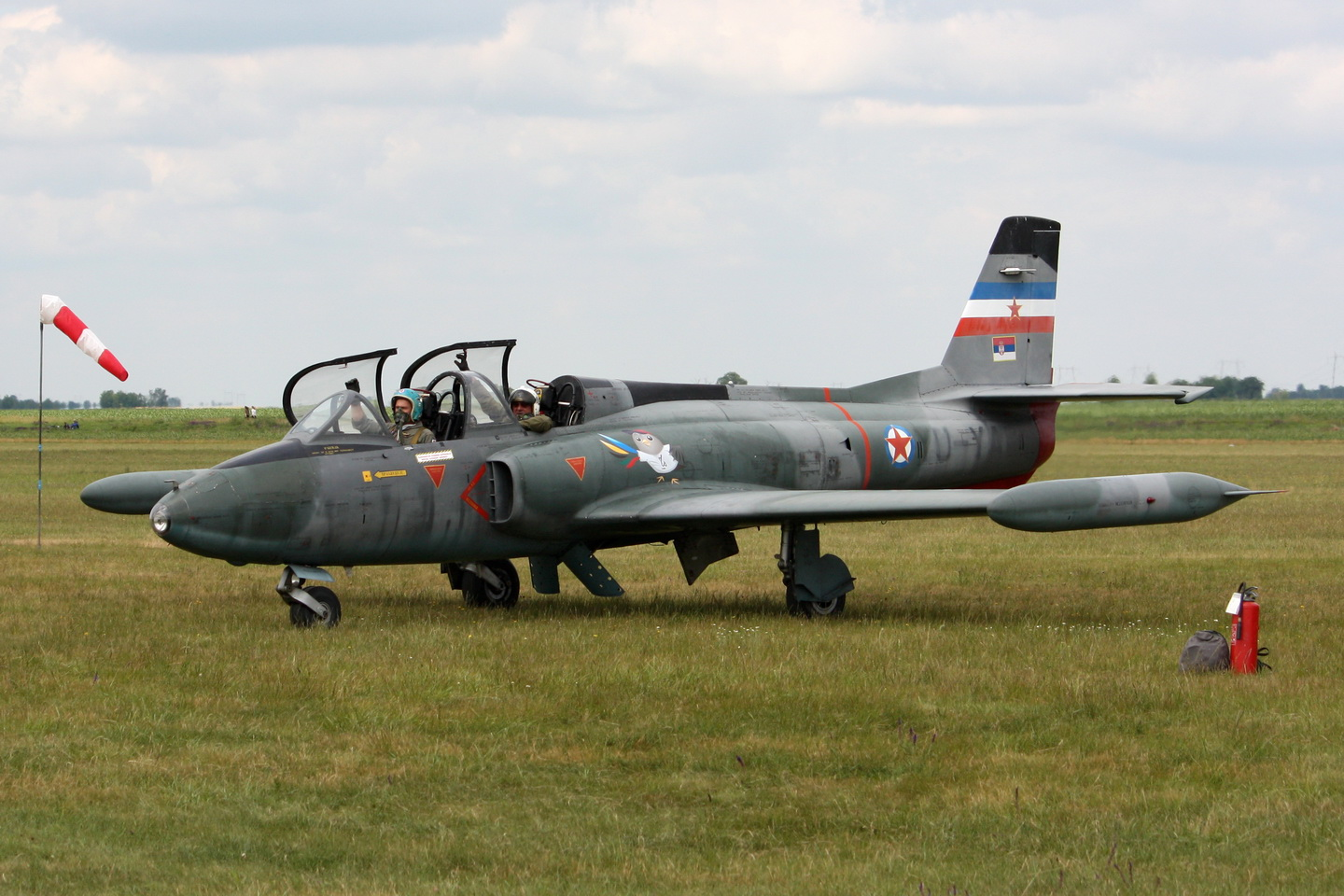

General information
- Type: Jet trainer and ground-attack
- National origin: Yugoslavia
- Manufacturer: SOKO
- Designer: Aeronautical Technical Institute
- Status: Limited service
- Primary users: Yugoslav Air Force Libyan Air Force
- Number built: 248

History
- Manufactured: 1965–1985
- First flight: 3 July 1961
- Variant: J-21 Jastreb

The Soko G-2 Galeb (from Serbian: галеб, lit. 'seagull') is a Yugoslav single engine, two-seater jet trainer and light ground-attack aircraft. The G-2 was developed during the 1950s by the Aeronautical Technical Institute in Žarkovo as a replacement for the Lockheed T-33 in service with the Yugoslav Air Force (RV i PVO). Production started in 1965 at the Soko aircraft factory in Mostar, and ended in 1985 with 248 aircraft delivered. The G-2 had the distinction of being the first mass-produced jet aircraft in socialist Yugoslavia. It also served as a basis for the single-seat ground-attack J-21 Jastreb.

The RV i PVO took delivery of 128 aircraft that were used by the Air Force Academy for training new pilots. The second largest operator of the Galeb was Libya, which acquired over 100 aircraft during the 1970s. A small number were also acquired by Zaire, Zambia and Indonesia. During the breakup of Yugoslavia, the Galebs were used for ground attack sorties in Croatia and Bosnia and Herzegovina. By 1992, RV i PVO G-2s relocated to Serbia and Montenegro, where they operated with the air force of the new Federal Republic of Yugoslavia. The aircraft remained in service until 1999, when the majority of them were destroyed on the ground during the NATO bombing of Yugoslavia.

The Libyan Air Force's G-2s were used during the Libyan Civil War by Gaddafi forces, with an unknown number surviving the war and being reported in service as late as 2013. A single aircraft remains in service with the Technical Test Center of the Serbian Armed Forces. A number of aircraft are still flown by civilians as warbirds, including the private aerobatic team "Stars" from Novi Sad.

== Development ==
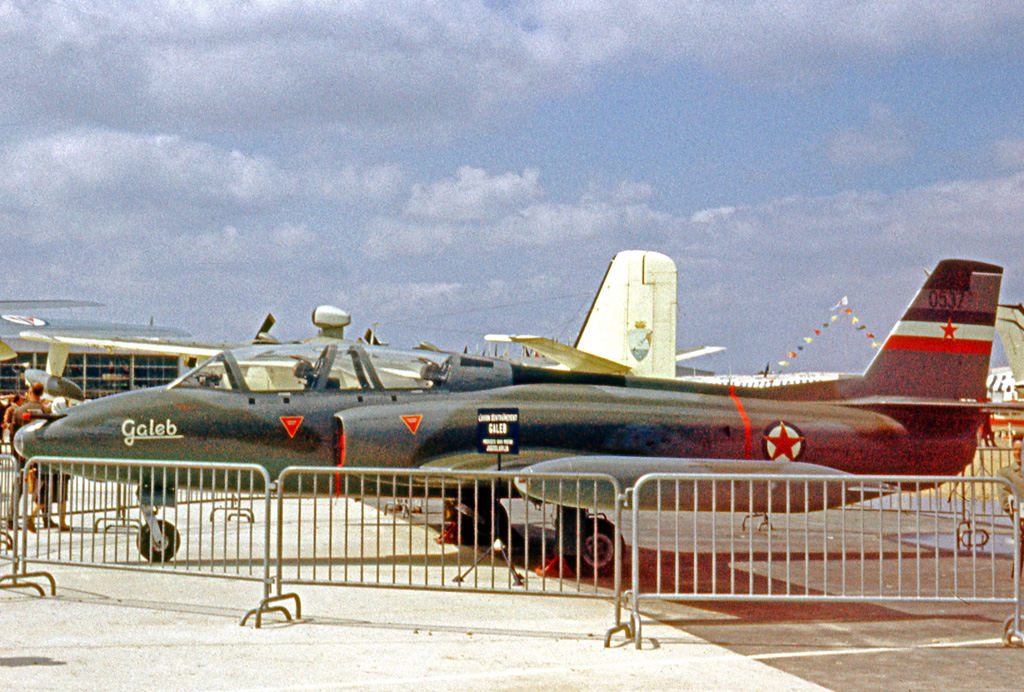
A G-2 Galeb on static display during the 1963 Paris Air Show

In 1957, Yugoslavia's Aeronautical Technical Institute (Serbo-Croatian: Vazduhoplovnotehnički institut; VTI) commenced design work on the aircraft, which would later receive the name Galeb. The principal purpose for the development of the Galeb was to produce a domestic replacement for the American-built Lockheed T-33 Shooting Star, which at the time was the most commonly used jet trainer aircraft in use by the Yugoslav Air Force; the Galeb was to be capable of meeting the varied qualities and requirements involved in performing ab initio, intermediate, and advanced instructional training missions. Primary manufacturing of the Galeb was performed by Yugoslav aircraft manufacturer SOKO at their facility in Mostar, Bosnia and Herzegovina, which had been established earlier that decade in 1951.

The Galeb was developed as a collaborative effort between Yugoslavia and the United Kingdom, and reportedly contributed significantly to the export value of the latter;. a significant proportion of components and ancillary equipment, such as the powerplant, ejector seats, and navigational fittings among others, that were installed upon the aircraft had been sourced from or were directly produced by a range of British aerospace manufacturers. According to aviation publication Flight International, the heavy proportion of British equipment employed upon the Galeb was a decisive factor in the appearance of the aircraft at the 1968 Farnborough Airshow.

Sponsorship for the aircraft's development was provided by the British engine manufacturer Rolls-Royce Limited, whose Armstrong Siddeley Viper turbojet engine was selected to power the type. The selection of the Viper engine to power the type had been motivated by a broad requirement for a simplistic powerplant that would be easy to service and be robust in spite of the inevitably rough handling performed by inexperienced pilots during flight training, as well as being easy to install within the airframe and possessing modest turbine inlet temperatures.

A total of two prototype aircraft were built to conduct the type's flight test program. On 3 July 1961, the maiden flight of the first of these prototypes, referred to as Galeb 1, was performed by test pilot captain Ljubomir Zekavica. The principal difference between the Galeb 1 prototype and the later Galeb 2 was that Galeb 1 had three rubber tanks in the fuselage, while the later Galeb 2 employed a total of two fuselage tanks holding 230 gallons (US) and two wingtip tanks holding 51 gallons (US) each. Following the completion of a full-size wooden mock-up, the second prototype Galeb 2 was constructed - establishing the G-2 type designation.

During flight tests, a maximum speed of 812 km/h (438 kn) at 6,200 m (20,300 ft) was achieved in clean configuration, with no paint and a polished airframe. Top diving speed was Mach 0.81, which could be obtained during a prolonged dive from high altitude. According to Soko's chief test pilot, Captain Dušan Krvavica, the Galeb is "unfatiguing and easy to fly". Other favourable attributes of the aircraft include docile stall characteristics and being capable of conservative touchdown speeds.

The G-2 Galeb made its first appearance outside of Yugoslavia at the 1963 Paris Air Show.

In 1964, production of the G-2 commenced, making it the first indigenously developed jet aircraft to enter mass production in Yugoslavia (the first jet-powered plane built by Yugoslavia was the Ikarus 451M in 1952, which did not enter production). After the Soko 522, it was the second aircraft built at SOKO. The first production series G-2-A was entered in the aircraft register of the Yugoslav Air Force on 30 July 1965, and the last one on 6 January 1981. The G-2-A was known within the Yugoslav military under the N-60 designation. Production of updated aircraft for export to Libya was extended until mid-1983. Soko produced a total of 248 Galeb aircraft, 132 of which were used by the Yugoslav Air Force.

== Design ==
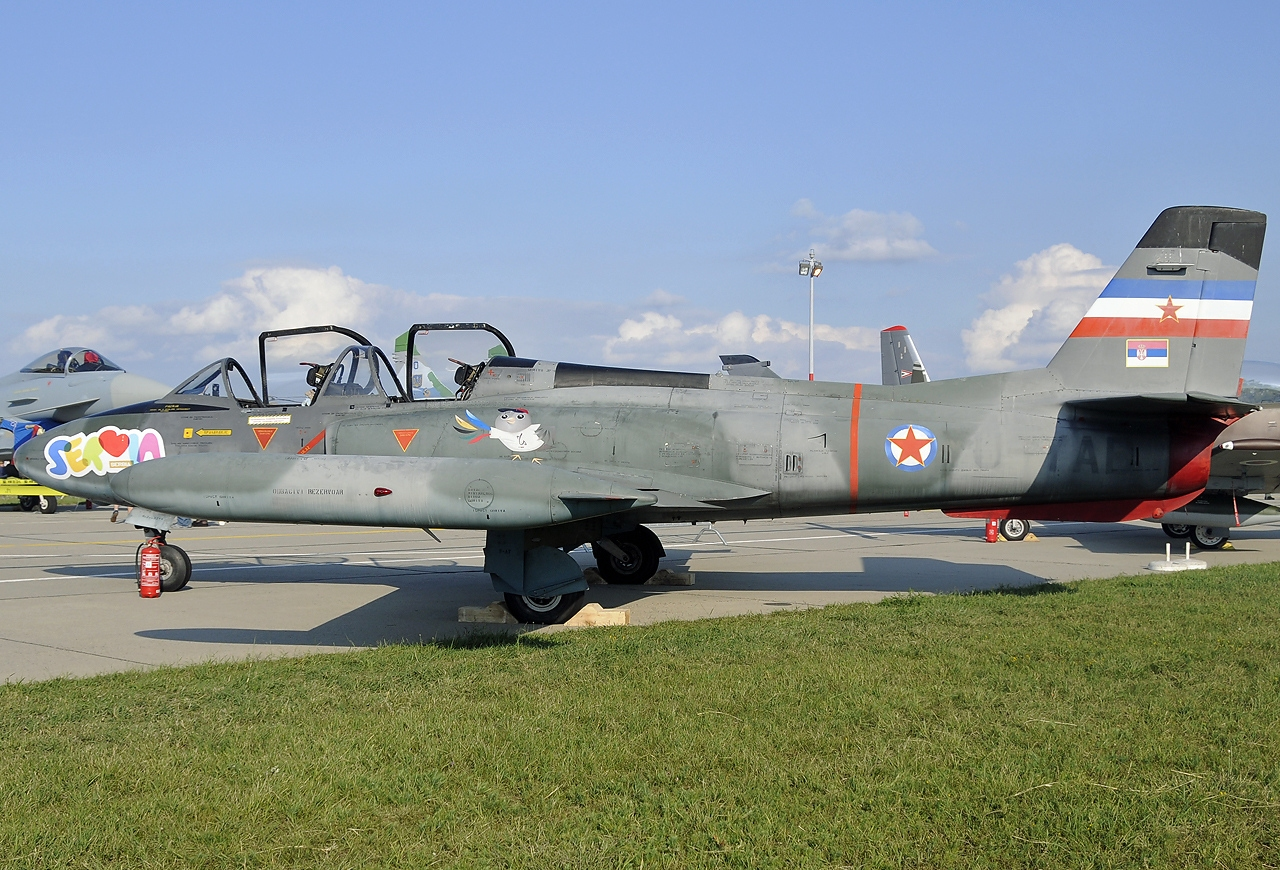
A Serbian G-2 Galeb at Kecskemet Air Base, Hungary, 2010

The G-2 Galeb is a versatile trainer aircraft, suited for carrying out a varied range of training missions to minimize number of aircraft needed to meet an operator's overall training requirements. The aircraft is flown by a crew of two, typically a candidate pilot and an instructor, which are seated in a tandem cockpit layout, the candidate being typically placed in the forward position; both crew members are provided with Folland Type 1-B lightweight ejector seats.

The Galeb is powered by a single Armstrong Siddeley Viper II Mark 22/6 turbojet engine, capable of providing up to 2,500lb of thrust. According to Flight International, the Viper engine provides the aircraft to perform rapid and stall-free acceleration under all conditions. The Galeb has a simple structure, using conventional stressed-skin construction using frames and bulkheads. The rear fuselage, which attaches to the main fuselage of the aircraft just behind the cockpit canopy, enables a high level of accessibility to the engine and the surrounding section; the forward fuselage contains to the tandem cockpit, integral center-section, and most systems. Tail unit pick-up points are present on the rear fuselage bulkhead. The Galeb features an all-metal straight wing, complete with tip tanks; the landing gear retracts into the wings rather than the fuselage.

The hydraulic system include an engine-driven hydraulic pump, a hydraulic reservoir/accumulator, and filter. The electrical systems involve a 24-volt battery, a high-energy ignition system, generator, landing and taxi lamps, navigation lighting, and an anti-collision beacon. Pneumatic systems comprise a bleed air compressor, de-icing/de-misting measures, and elements of the environmental control system.

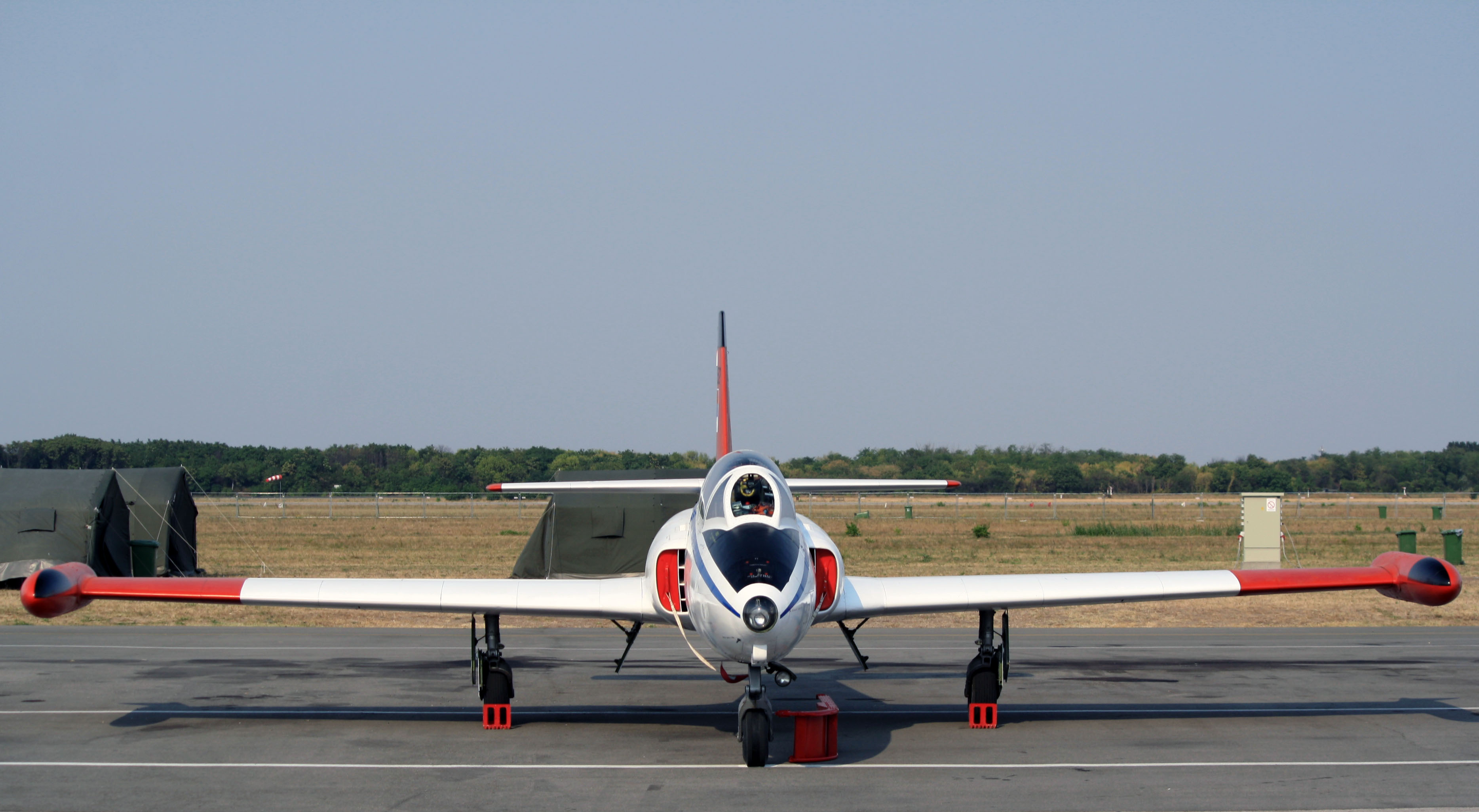
An operational G-2 Galeb on display at Batajnica Air Show 2012

In the absence of a pressurized cabin, the aircraft's practical ceiling is between 7,000 and 9,000 m (23,000 and 30,000 ft). According to Soko, a pressurised cabin was developed by 1968 for the Galeb and was made available to customers. The Air Force needed a trainer with secondary combat ability that could operate from unprepared runways; being unfamiliar with such requirements, the designers provided for landing gear strong enough to make the aircraft suitable for landing on aircraft carriers. The need for a safe training aircraft that is forgiving on landings meant that the wheels retract into the wings instead of the fuselage, making for a heavier, straight wing, which is less likely to stall on landing, but precludes supersonic flight.

The trainer-orientated Galeb has few design differences to the ground attack-orientated Soko J-21 Jastreb; aside from strengthening of the airframe, one distinct difference between the two aircraft is the deletion of the rear cockpit on the J-21 Jastreb, this location has instead been covered by a fairing and the internal space used to contain avionics and other aircraft equipment. The Galeb is readily capable of performing ground attack missions in addition to its training role, being fitted with underwing hardpoints that are compatible with a range of munitions, such as bombs and rockets, along with 12.7mm machine guns; to conduct reconnaissance missions, camera equipment could also be installed upon for the aircraft.

== Operational history ==
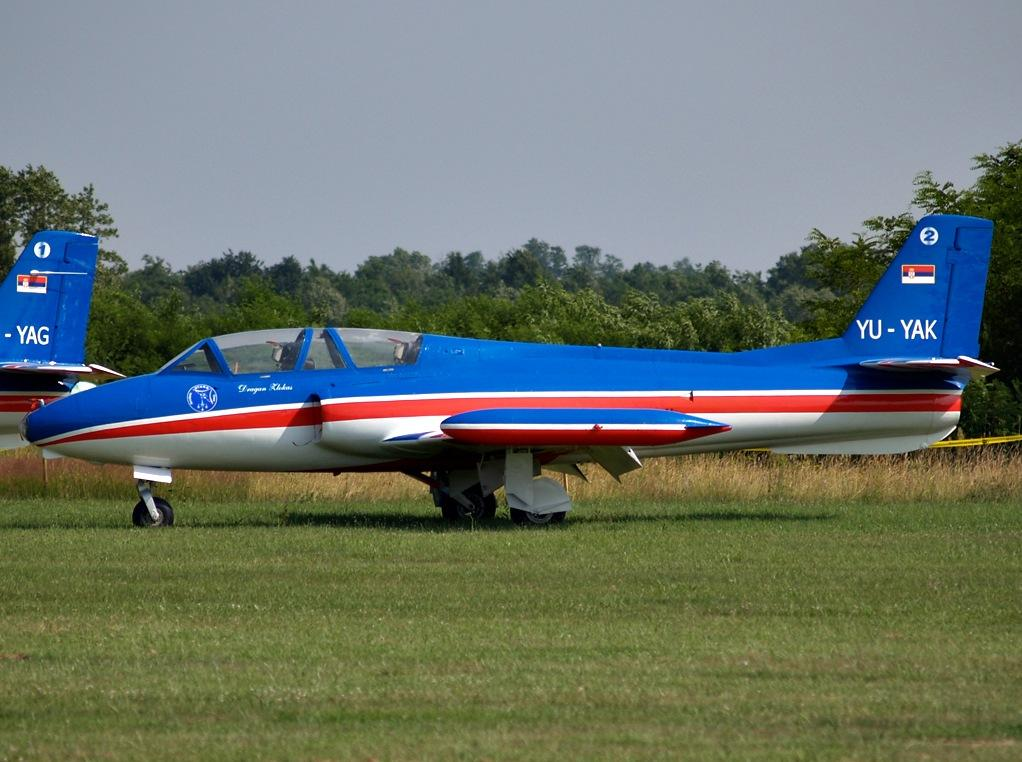
A G-2 Galeb, 2008

The G-2-A Galeb was the standard version operated by the Yugoslav Air Force. They were used primarily for school-combat training of VVA (Military Air Force Academy) cadets, thus the largest number of these aircraft was located within the VVA units. By 1968, the Galeb was reportedly being used for the training of the majority of the Yugoslav Air Force's pilots.

The aircraft was reportedly very easy and forgiving in flight, with easy maintenance, so students and technicians loved it. They regularly achieved 5,000 hours in the air (the G-2 Galeb on display in the Yugoslav Aeronautical Museum had 6,200 hours in its logbook). A G-2-AE export variant became available from late 1974 and was built for Libya and Zambia.

In the early 2000s, the Serbian jet display team The Stars (Serbian: Zvezde) made their international debut with four G-2 Galebs at the Air Borne 2007 airshow in Rakičan, Slovenia.

=== Balkans ===
The G-2-A Galeb saw extensive combat use by the 105th Fighter-Bomber Regiment of the Yugoslav Air Force over Bosnia-Herzegovina during the Bosnian War. United Nations personnel stationed in Croatia observed multiple Galebs depart Udbina in Serb-controlled territory to conduct strike missions.

=== First Congo War ===
According to some reports, France and Yugoslavia supported Mobutu's government during the First Congo War. Namely, Yugoslavia agreed to dispatch three J-21 and one G-2 aircraft, as well as four MiG-21PFMs, while three Mi-24s were purchased from Ukraine and sent to the region as well. All these aircraft were based at Gbadolite Airport in the Nord-Ubangi District, and were flown mainly by Serbian mercenaries. With few exceptions, it remains unknown exactly what happened with each of these aircraft and how were they used after their arrival in Zaire in late 1996–1997. In the case of Mi-24s it is known that one hit a power line and crashed on 27 March 1997, killing the three crewmen and four passengers.

The fate of at least one J-21 Jastreb was not much better: Ratko Turčinović, one of the Serbian mercenaries, was killed while flying an ultra-low-level pass over Gbadolite and clipping a lamp post with his wing. The wreckage of his aircraft fell directly onto a column of young soldiers on a parade, causing dozens of deaths amongst them. Turčinović is alleged to have fallen victim to a personal alcohol problem. After this event, the Serbs were expelled and the Jastrebs and Galebs were abandoned along with the MiG-21s and two Mi-24s which were meant to be put together by group of Russian or Ukrainian technicians at Gbadolite but the assembly work was never completed.

=== Libya ===
The Libyan Air Force was a prolific operator of the type; by 2002, it reportedly had a total of 80 G-2 Galeb aircraft remaining in its inventory.

The type was used extensively during the 2011 Libyan civil war by government forces fighting against a popular uprising centered in the Eastern region of Libya. Forces loyal to Libyan leader Muammar Gaddafi used the type to routinely perform ground attack missions upon rebel forces. On 24 March 2011, one G-2 Galeb was destroyed after landing by a French Air Force Dassault Rafale after it had violated the declared no-fly zone over Misrata. The following day, a further five G-2 aircraft together with two Mil Mi-35 helicopters were reportedly destroyed by French combat aircraft operating in the same area; satellite imagery later revealed that these five aircraft had in fact been Mikoyan-Gurevich MiG-23 fighters instead.

During the Second Libyan Civil War, Islamist forces from Libya Dawn (led by the unrecognized new General National Congress based in Tripoli) are reported to have two to four Galebs in service. However, their actual operational status is hard to determine.

=== Popular warbird ===
Before the Yugoslav Wars, at least a dozen Galebs were purchased by American warbird dealers, and several remain on the civil register. Other operators are located in Indonesia, Serbia, New Zealand, Slovenia and the United States. It has been also used in air combat scenes of the Aces: Iron Eagle III movie.

== Variants ==
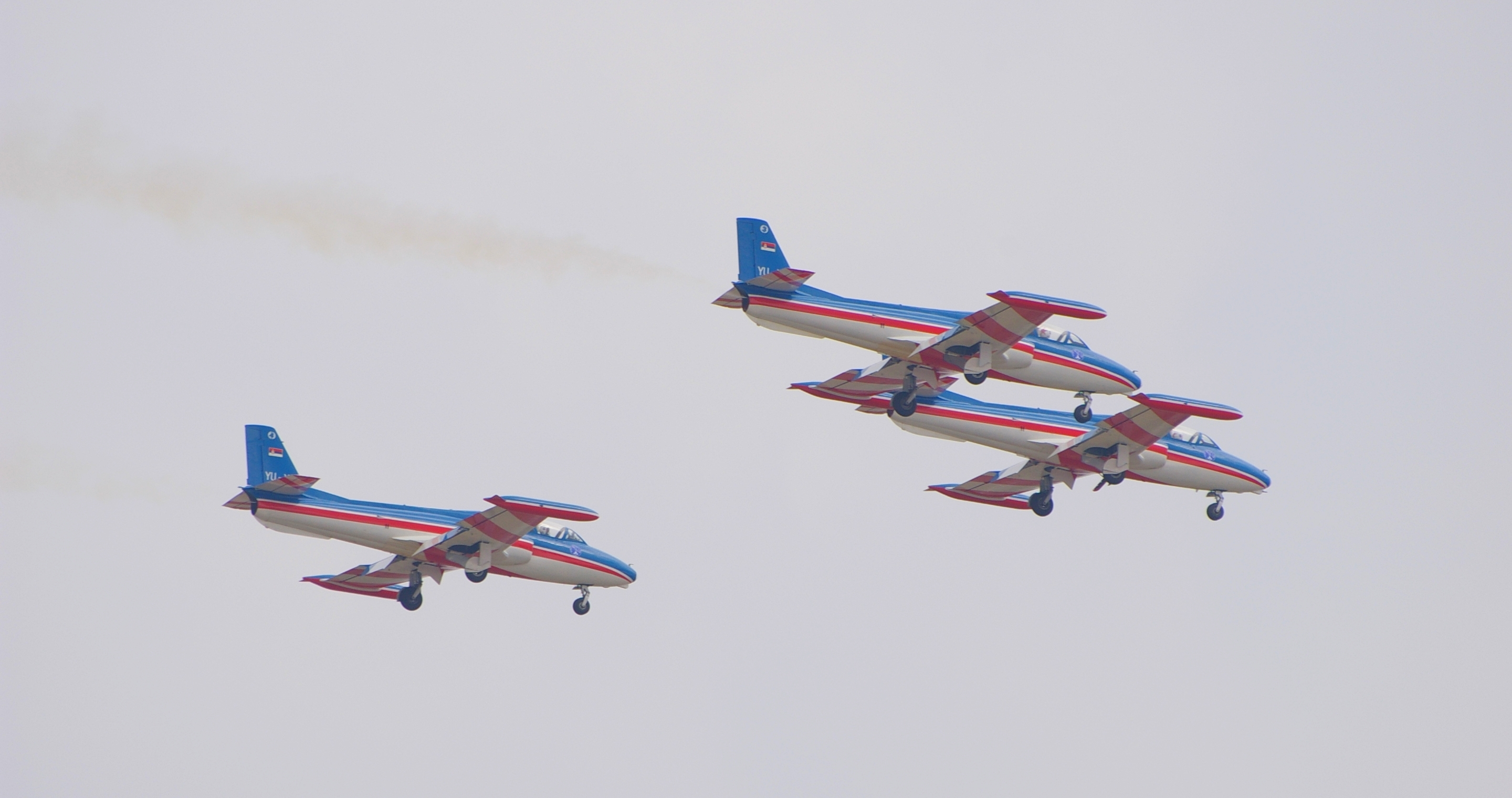
The Serbian aerobatic team "Flying Stars" at an airshow in Slovenia, 2008

G-2-A
Two-seat advanced jet trainer, light attack aircraft.
G-2A-E
Two-seat export version for Libya and Zambia.
G-2Š
Unarmed trainer.
G3 Galeb-3
Prototype of export version first flown 19 August 1970, with BMB (Rolls-Royce/Bristol Siddeley) Viper Mk 532 Turbojet engine from J-21 Jastreb, modern cockpit, cameras in tip-tanks, weapon load doubled, JATO and other modifications.

== Operators ==
=== Current operators ===
Libya

- Libyan Air Force − 14 as of December 2023

Serbia

- Serbian Air Force − 1 as of December 2023

=== Former operators ===
Bosnia and Herzegovina

- Air Force and Anti-Aircraft Defence of Bosnia and Herzegovina

Croatia

- Croatian Air Force briefly flew three examples captured during Operation Storm.

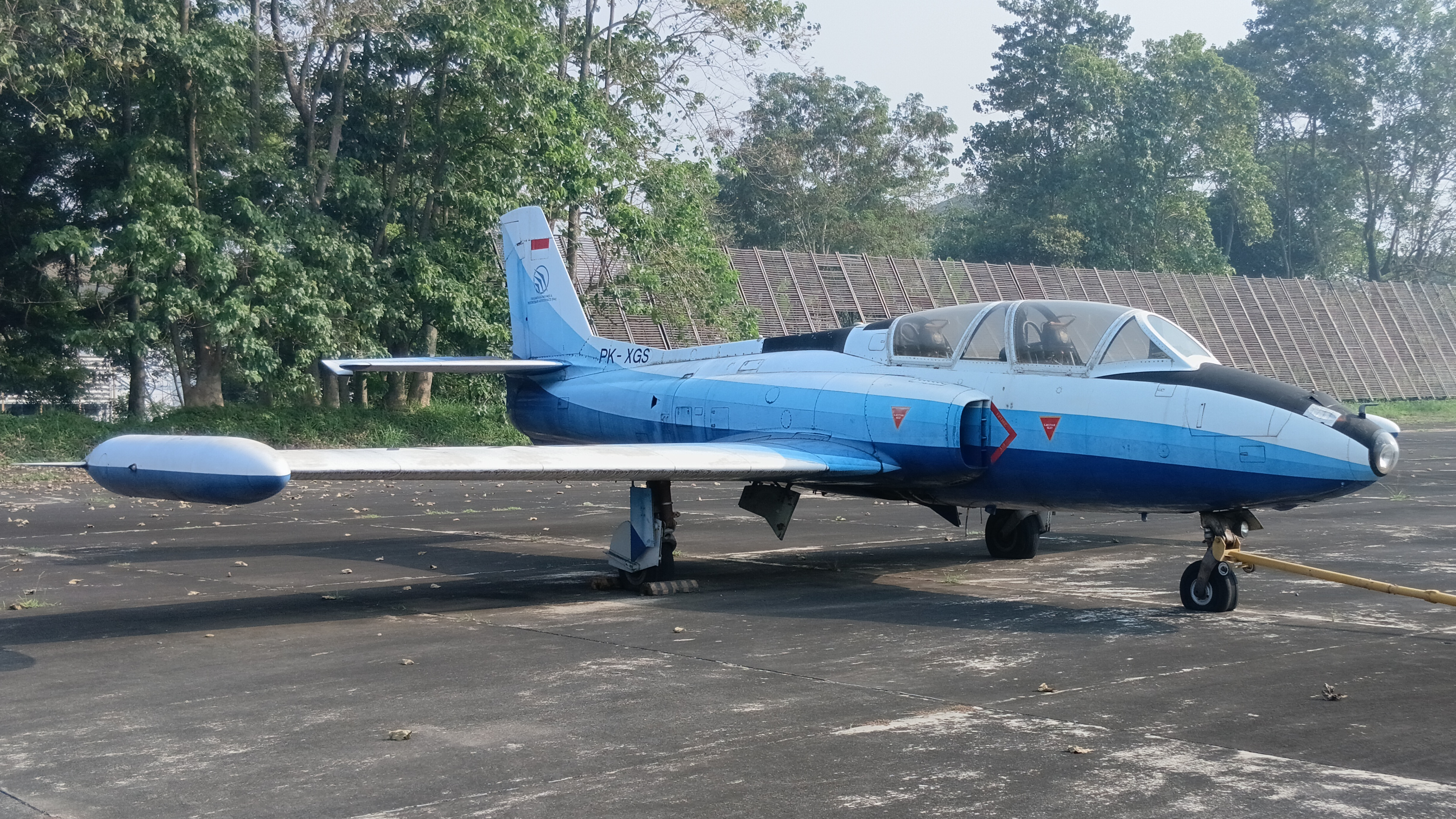
G-2 Galeb owned by IPTN, June 2025

Indonesia

- IPTN have 1 G-2 Galeb, registered as PK-XGS. This aircraft was used as chaser for IPTN N-250 first flight. As of 2018 stored at Indonesian Aerospace hangar in Bandung with N-250 prototypes.

Libyan Arab Jamahiriya

- Libyan Air Force − (G-2A-E version) Initially 116 (5 aircraft captured during 2011 conflict at Misrata).

(Libya) Libyan opposition

- Free Libyan Air Force − (G-2A-E version) Five aircraft captured from the Gaddafist air force at Misrata Airport on 24 February 2011.

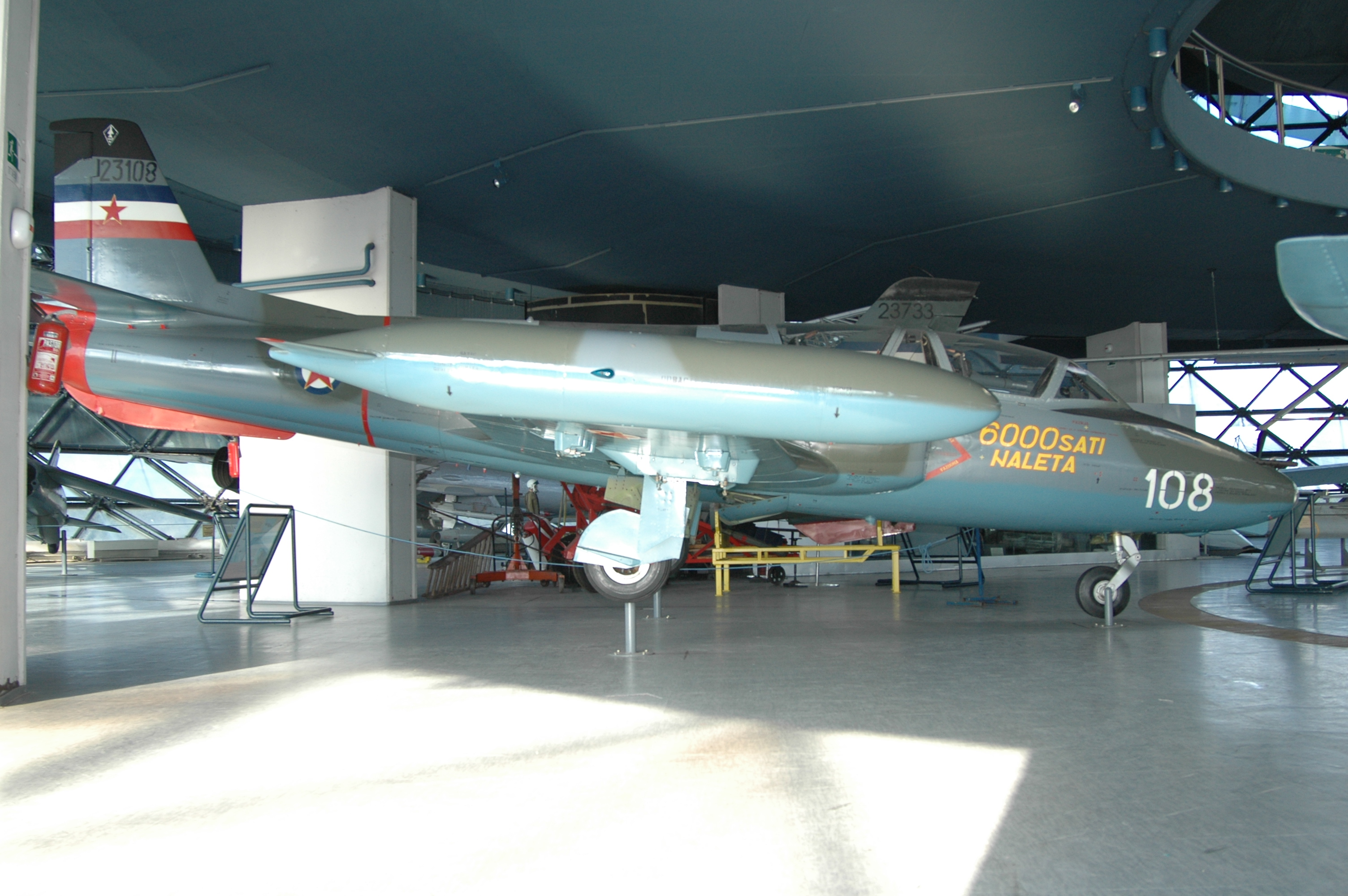
A Yugoslav G-2 Galeb on display at the Museum of Aviation in Belgrade

Yugoslavia

- Yugoslav Air Force

Zaire

- One Galeb delivered together with three Jastrebs as part of a French–Yugoslav contract in 1997.

Zambia

- Zambian Air Force, two aircraft delivered in 1971

=== Private operators ===
- John Travolta - 1

== Specifications (G-2-A) ==
Soko G-2A Galeb

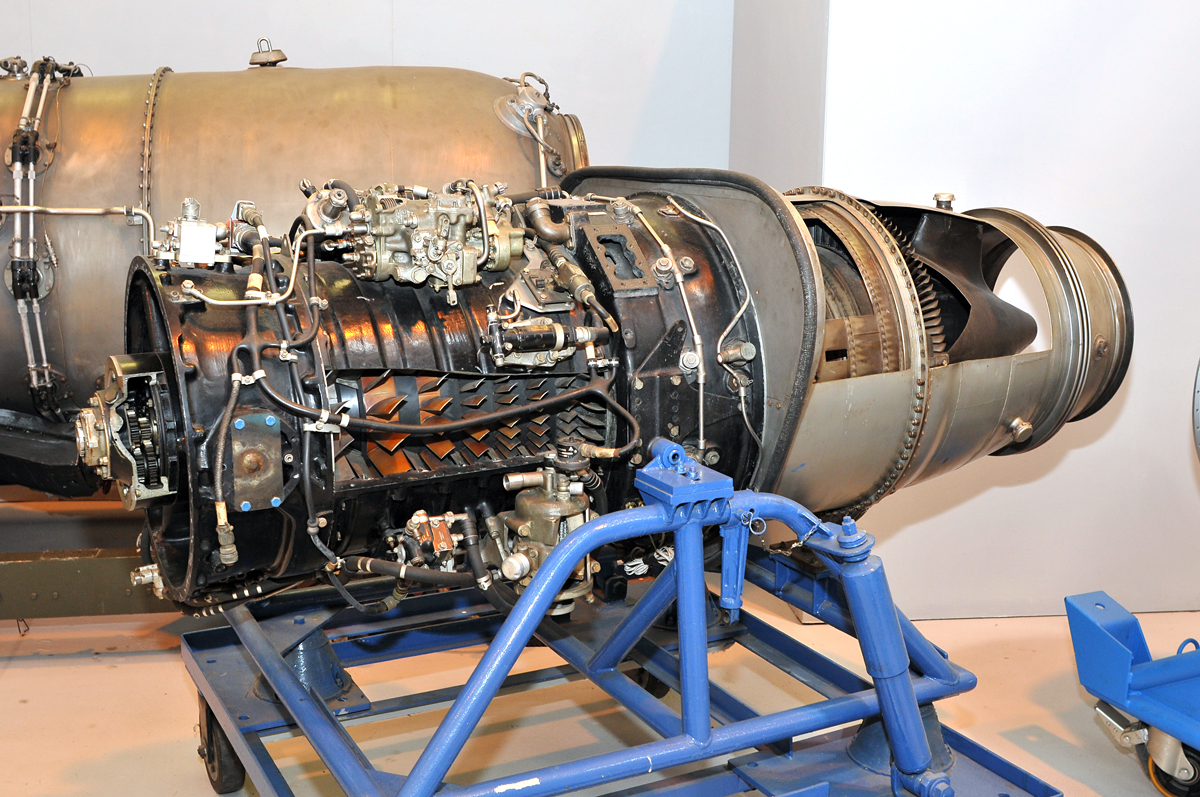
Preserved Rolls-Royce Viper in Royal Air Force Museum Midlands

Data from Jane's All The World's Aircraft 1982–83, Flight International

General characteristics

- Crew: 2
- Length: 10.34 m (33 ft 11 in)
- Wingspan: 11.62 m (38 ft 1 in) with tip-tanks

10.47 m (34 ft) without tip-tanks

- Height: 3.28 m (10 ft 9 in)
- Wing area: 19.43 m^{2} (209.1 sq ft)
- Aspect ratio: 5.55
- Airfoil: root: NACA 64A213.5; tip: NACA 64A212
- Empty weight: 2,620 kg (5,776 lb) equipped
- Max takeoff weight: 3,374 kg (7,438 lb) (clean aerobatic trainer)

3,488 kg (7,690 lb) (basic trainer without tip-tanks)
3,828 kg (8,439 lb) (nav trainer with tip-tanks)
3,988 kg (8,792 lb) (weapons trainer)
4,300 kg (9,480 lb) (strike mission)

- Fuel capacity: 780 kg (1,720 lb) internal + 340 kg (750 lb) in two optional wing-tip drop tanks
- Powerplant: 1 × DMB license-built Rolls-Royce Viper ASV.11 Mk 22-6 turbojet engine, 11.12 kN (2,500 lbf) thrust

Performance

- Maximum speed: 756 km/h (470 mph, 408 kn) at sea level

812 km/h (505 mph; 438 kn) at 6,200 m (20,300 ft)

- Stall speed: 158 km/h (98 mph, 85 kn) flaps down and airbrakes out

180 km/h (110 mph; 97 kn) flaps up and airbrakes in

- Range: 669 km (416 mi, 361 nmi) at 9,000 m (30,000 ft) with full tip-tanks
- Endurance: 2 hours30 minutes at 7,000 m (23,000 ft)
- Service ceiling: 12,000 m (39,000 ft)
- g limits: +8 -4
- Rate of climb: 22.83 m/s (4,494 ft/min)
- Time to altitude:

- 3,000 m (9,800 ft) in 2 minutes 24 seconds
- 6,000 m (20,000 ft) in 5 minutes 30 seconds
- 9,000 m (30,000 ft) in 10 minutes 12 seconds

- Take-off run: 490 m (1,610 ft) on grass
- Landing run: 400 m (1,300 ft) on grass
- Take-off run to 15 m (49 ft): 640 m (2,100 ft)
- Landing run from 15 m (49 ft): 710 m (2,330 ft)

Armament

- Guns: 2× 12.7 mm (0.500 in) machine guns in nose with 80 rpg
- Hardpoints: 4 with a capacity of 300 kg (661 lb) total

Avionics
full IFR instrumentation with comms

== See also ==
External videos
- G-2 Galeb performing at the Classic Fighters 2005 airshow, Blenheim, New Zealand
- Still images of the restoration of a pair of Galeb aircraft
- Aerobatic Team STARS performing using four Galeb aircraft

- Ikarus 452

Related development

- J-21 Jastreb
- Soko G-4 Super Galeb

Aircraft of comparable role, configuration, and era

- Aermacchi MB-326
- Aero L-29 Delfín
- BAC Jet Provost
- Fouga Magister
- HAL HJT-16 Kiran
- Hispano HA-200
- Lockheed T-33 Shooting Star
- PZL TS-11 Iskra
