= List of Yugoslav Air Force squadrons =

Until the start of the 1959 reorganization of Yugoslav People's Army known under codename "Drvar", each Aviation Regiment of the Yugoslav Air Force comprised three aircraft squadrons and one technical squadron, whose task was to prepare materials and supplies of all three aircraft squadrons. Aircraft squadrons were marked as 1st, 2nd and 3rd Squadron of some Aviation Regiment. There were also some independent squadrons and training squadrons of Aviation Divisions, liaison squadrons of Military districts and Aviation Corps, light combat aviation squadrons and liaison squadrons of Air Command.

After the application of the "Drvar" reorganization for the Air Force, from April 1961, new type designation system is used to identify squadrons:

- fighter aviation squadrons were given numbers from 120 onwards,
- fighter-bomber aviation squadrons were given numbers from 235 onwards,
- reconnaissance aviation squadrons were given numbers from 350 onwards,
- light combat aviation squadrons were given numbers from 460 onwards,
- anti-submarine aviation squadrons were given numbers from 570 onwards,
- transport aviation squadrons were given numbers from 675 onwards,
- helicopter squadrons were given numbers from 780 onwards,
- liaison aviation squadrons were given numbers from 890 onwards.

== WWII Squadrons ==
- 1st NOVJ Squadron
- 2nd NOVJ Squadron
- Liaison Squadron of VŠ NOV i POJ
- Squadron of 5th NOVJ Corps
- 1st Squadron of 5th NOVJ Corps
- 2nd Squadron of 5th NOVJ Corps
- Mostar Squadron

== Squadrons until 1961 ==
=== Independent Squadrons ===
- 715th Independent Reconnaissance Squadron
- 122nd Hydroplane Liaison Squadron
- 27th Helicopter Squadron
- 16th Reconnaissance Squadron of Anti-Aircraft Artillery
- 34th Helicopter Squadron
- 48th Helicopter Squadron

=== Training Squadrons of Aviation Division ===
- Training Squadron of 21st Aviation Division
- Training Squadron of 29th Aviation Division
- Training Squadron of 32nd Aviation Division
- Training Squadron of 37th Aviation Division
- Training Squadron of 39th Aviation Division
- Training Squadron of 44th Aviation Division

=== Liaison Squadrons of Military districts and Aviation Corps ===
- Liaison Squadron of 1st Military district
- Liaison Squadron of 3rd Military district
- Liaison Squadron of 5th Military district
- Liaison Squadron of 7th Military district
- Liaison Squadron of 3rd Aviation Corps
- Liaison Squadron of 7th Aviation Corps

=== Light Combat Aviation Squadrons and Liaison Squadrons of Air Commands ===
- Light Combat Aviation Squadron of 1st Air Command
- Light Combat Aviation Squadron of 3rd Air Command
- Light Combat Aviation Squadron of 5th Air Command
- Light Combat Aviation Squadron of 7th Air Command
- Light Combat Aviation Squadron of 9th Air Command
- Liaison Squadron of 1st Air Command
- Liaison Squadron of 3rd Air Command
- Liaison Squadron of 5th Air Command
- Liaison Squadron of 7th Air Command
- Liaison Squadron of 9th Air Command

== Squadrons after 1961 ==
=== Fighter Aviation Squadrons ===
- 120th Fighter Aviation Squadron
- 121st Fighter Aviation Squadron
- 122nd Fighter Aviation Squadron
- 123rd Fighter Aviation Squadron
- 124th Fighter Aviation Squadron
- 125th Fighter Aviation Squadron
- 126th Fighter Aviation Squadron
- 127th Fighter Aviation Squadron
- 128th Fighter Aviation Squadron
- 129th Fighter Aviation Squadron
- 130th Fighter Aviation Squadron

=== Fighter-Bomber Aviation Squadrons ===
- 229th Fighter-Bomber Aviation Squadron
- 235th Fighter-Bomber Aviation Squadron
- 236th Fighter-Bomber Aviation Squadron
- 237th Fighter-Bomber Aviation Squadron
- 238th Fighter-Bomber Aviation Squadron
- 239th Fighter-Bomber Aviation Squadron
- 240th Fighter-Bomber Aviation Squadron
- 241st Fighter-Bomber Aviation Squadron
- 242nd Fighter-Bomber Aviation Squadron
- 243rd Fighter-Bomber Aviation Squadron
- 245th Fighter-Bomber Aviation Squadron
- 247th Fighter-Bomber Aviation Squadron
- 249th Fighter-Bomber Aviation Squadron
- 251st Fighter-Bomber Aviation Squadron
- 252nd Fighter-Bomber Aviation Squadron
- 334th Fighter-Bomber Aviation Squadron

=== Reconnaissance Aviation Squadrons ===
- 350th Reconnaissance Aviation Squadron
- 351st Reconnaissance Aviation Squadron
- 352nd Reconnaissance Aviation Squadron
- 353rd Reconnaissance Aviation Squadron
- 354th Reconnaissance Aviation Squadron
- 355th Reconnaissance Aviation Squadron

=== Light Combat Aviation Squadrons ===
- 460th Light Combat Aviation Squadron
- 461st Light Combat Aviation Squadron
- 462nd Light Combat Aviation Squadron
- 463rd Light Combat Aviation Squadron
- 464th Light Combat Aviation Squadron
- 465th Light Combat Aviation Squadron
- 466th Light Combat Aviation Squadron
- 467th Light Combat Aviation Squadron

=== Anti-Submarine Aviation Squadrons ===
- 570th Anti-Submarine Aviation Squadron
- 571st Anti-Submarine Aviation Squadron

=== Transport Aviation Squadrons ===
- 675th Transport Aviation Squadron
- 676th Transport Aviation Squadron
- 677th Transport Aviation Squadron
- 678th Transport Aviation Squadron
- 679th Transport Aviation Squadron

=== Helicopter Squadrons ===
- 711th Anti-Armored Helicopter Squadron
- 712th Anti-Armored Helicopter Squadron
- 713th Anti-Armored Helicopter Squadron
- 714th Anti-Armored Helicopter Squadron
- 722nd Anti-Armored Helicopter Squadron
- 780th Transport Helicopter Squadron
- 781st Transport Helicopter Squadron
- 782nd Transport Helicopter Squadron
- 783rd Helicopter Squadron
- 784th Anti-Submarine Helicopter Squadron
- 787th Transport Helicopter Squadron
- 789th Transport Helicopter Squadron
- 790th Transport Helicopter Squadron
- 890th Transport Helicopter Squadron

=== Liaison Aviation Squadrons ===
- 890th Liaison Aviation Squadron
- 891st Liaison Aviation Squadron
- 892nd Liaison Aviation Squadron
- 893rd Liaison Aviation Squadron
- 894th Liaison Aviation Squadron
- 895th Helicopter Reconnaissance and Liaison Squadron
- 896th Helicopter Reconnaissance and Liaison Squadron
- 897th Helicopter Reconnaissance and Liaison Squadron
- 898th Helicopter Reconnaissance and Liaison Squadron

=== Other Squadrons ===
- 333rd Mixed Aviation Squadron
- 525th Training Aviation Squadron
- 676th Fire-Fighting Aviation Squadron
- 678th Mixed Aviation Squadron
- 3rd Mixed Aviation Squadron of 105th Regiment
- 3rd Fighter-Bomber Aviation Squadron of 107th Helicopter Regiment

== Notes and references ==
- Yugoslav Air Force 1942-1992, Bojan Dimitrijević, Institute for modern history, Belgrade, 2006
