= 119th Helicopter Brigade =

119th Helicopter Brigade: 119. helikopterska brigada
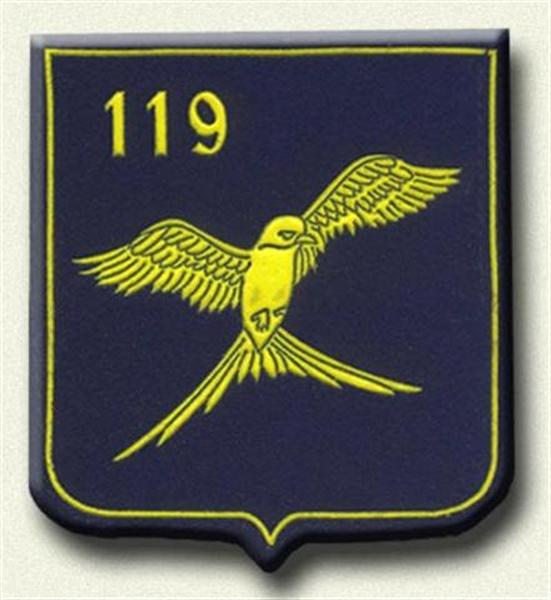
- Units badge since the 1990s
- Active: 1945–2007
- Disbanded: 2006
- Country: Yugoslavia; Yugoslavia; Serbia and Montenegro
- Branch: Yugoslav Air Force; Yugoslav Air Force
- Part of: Aviation Corps
- Garrison/HQ: Zemun (1945–1963); Batajnica Air Base (1963–1966); Niš Airport (1968–2006)
- Equipment: Lisunov Li-2 and Li-3 (1945–1966); Junkers Ju 52 (1945–1961); Douglas C-47 Skytrain (1953–1966, 1968–1976); Westland-Sikorsky WS-51 Mk.1B (1954–1966); Mil Mi-8 (1968–2006); Antonov An-2 (1976–1991); Antonov An-26 (1976–1991); Soko SA.341 Gazelle/SA.342 Gama (1982–2006)
- Engagements: Yugoslav wars

The 119th Helicopter Brigade (Serbian: 119. хеликоптерска бригада / 119. helikopterska brigada) was a transport aviation unit of Yugoslav and FR Yugoslav Air Force established in 1945 as the 1st Transport Aviation Regiment (Serbo-Croatian: 1. vazduhoplovni transportni puk / 1. ваздухопловни транспортни пук).

== History ==
=== 1st Transport Aviation Regiment ===
The regiment was established in the first half of August 1945, in Zemun, as Yugoslav Air Force main transport air unit. The regiment was under direct command of Yugoslav Air Force HQ. It was equipped with Soviet Lisunov Li-2 and captured Luftwaffe Junkers Ju 52 transport aircraft and other types.

After the war, the regiment remained at Pleso.

By 1948, the regiment was renamed, like all other units of the Yugoslav Army, becoming the 119th Transport Aviation Regiment.

The commanders of the regiment in this period were Dimitrije Kovijanić, Vladimir Simić and Berislav Supek.

=== 119th Transport Aviation and Support Aviation Regiment ===
The 119th Transport Aviation Regiment remained at Zemun until 1963, when it has been dislocated to newer Batajnica Air Base. In this period regiment received US-built C-47 Skytrain transport aircraft. First operational helicopters of Yugoslav Air Force were Westland-Sikorsky WS-51 Mk.1B which were attached to new formed 5th Squadron (later designated as 27th Helicopter Squadron) of 119th Regiment located at Pančevo, since 1954. By the middle 1950s Regiment in its organization had five transport squadrons, one helicopter squadron and one liaison squadron.

In 1961 regiment was renamed to 119th Support Aviation Regiment (Serbo-Croatian: 119. puk pomoćne avijacije / 119. пук помоћне авијације). Same year due to the application of the "Drvar" reorganization for the Air Force, new type designation system is used to identify squadrons, so the squadrons of 119th Regiment have become 675th, 676th, 677th, 678th and 679th Transport Aviation Squadron, 783rd Helicopter Squadron and 890th Liaison Aviation Squadron.

It was reorganized by late 1961, when three of its squadrons were reassigned to form new Regiments of Support Aviation Regiments – 677th Squadron formed 81st Regiment, 678th first was at first independent but later in 1964 it has formed 97th Regiment and 679th Squadron formed 111th Regiment.

The 119th Support Aviation Regiment was disbanded in 1966. It's 676th Transport Aviation Squadron was also disbanded, 675th Transport Aviation Squadron was reassigned to 138th Transport Aviation Regiment, 783rd Helicopter Squadron become part of 107th Support Aviation Regiment while 890th Liaison Aviation Squadron remain as independent under Yugoslav Air Force Command.

The commanders of the regiment in this period were Nikola Rodić, Dimitrije Kovačević, Mido Rakočević, Nikola Đurđević and Matija Macut.

=== Re-establishment of the 119th Regiment ===
The 119th Transport Helicopter Regiment was formed, by order from 10 December 1967, on 2 May 1968 at Niš military airport. It was a completely new unit formed from two new helicopter squadrons – 787th and 789th Transport Helicopter Squadron. It continued the tradition of former 1st Transport Aviation Regiment and 119th Transport Aviation Regiment. Its two squadrons were equipped with new Soviet-made Mil Mi-8T transport helicopters, being the first unit of Yugoslav Air Force equipped with this type.

In 1973 it was renamed to 119th Support Aviation Regiment and the 677th Transport Aviation Squadron equipped with C-47 Skytrain cargo aircraft was moved from the 107th Support Aviation Regiment to 119th Regiment. US-made Skytrains were replaced by 1976 with Soviet-made Antonov An-26 and Polish-build Antonov An-2 transport aircraft. Regiment was again renamed in 1978 to 119th Transport Aviation Regiment. By the early 1980s Yugoslav Air Force has modernized its helicopter fleet with French-licensed domestic made helicopters SOKO Gazelle helicopters. In 1981 712nd Anti-Armored Helicopter Squadron was formed armed with new Gazelle helicopters equipped for anti-armored fighting. Due to the organizational changes, Regiment has become 119th Aviation Brigade (Serbo-Croatian: 119. avijacijska brigada / 119. авијацијска бригада).

In 1988 another one squadron of Gazelle helicopters, 714th has been formed at Kraljevo-Lađevci Airport as part of brigade. The 789th Transport Helicopter Squadron was disbanded in 1990 and its personnel and equipment were assigned to 787th Squadron, being from then the only squadron of brigade equipped with Mi-8T helicopters.

The units of 119th Aviation Brigade have taken part in combat operations during the 1991 and 1992 in Croatia and Bosnia. Mainly it was used for transport of elite 63rd Paratroop Brigade. It also took part in evacuation of Yugoslav People's Army personnel and civilians, MEDEVAC and combat search and rescue operations. Just during the first five months of 1992 787th Transport Helicopter Squadron has made 830 flight hours and have evacuated 5610 members of Yugoslav Air Force, 683 members of their families, 767 Yugoslav People's Army soldiers and 213 wounded flying from Željava Air Base, Pale, Kumbor, Zalužani, Batajnica Air Base and Udbina airport. In same period two Anti-Armored Helicopter Squadrons, 712th and 714th, have made 535 combat flights and 370 flight hours and transported 590 persons flying from Banaj Luka and Batajnica. During the 1991 the 677th Transport Aviation Squadron was reassigned to 138th Transport Aviation Regiment and brigade was reorganized into 119th Transport Helicopter Regiment.

After Yugoslav People's Army was officially dissolved in May 1992, the regiment has joined the newly formed Military of Federal Republic of Yugoslavia as part of its Air Force Aviation Corps. Later in 1996 it was again renamed, in to 119th Helicopter Brigade (Serbian: 119. хеликоптерска бригада / 119. helikopterska brigada). In that period the unit and its squadrons have got its official badges.

Brigade took operations during the Kosovo war in 1998 and 1999 and NATO bombing of Yugoslavia. Several helicopters have been destroyed on ground in NATO airstrikes. Beside air superiority of NATO alliance helicopters of 119th Helicopter Brigade have made several flights without any of them being shot down. Again main tasks were transport of 63rd Paratroop Brigade and evacuation.

In post-war period whole Air Force which has suffered heavy losses of equipment destroyed on ground and damaged infrastructure. Brigade had problem with old equipment, lack of spare parts and fuel, which have reduce the number of flight hours which were already low during the 1990s economical crisis due to the sanctions. Main problem was with Mi-8T transport helicopters, which from many were withdrawn due age and heavy exploitation during the wars. In 2006 after dissolution of Serbia and Montenegro Serbian Air Force has been reorganized with many units being disbanded. In 2007 the 98th Air Brigade was formed on 13 June 2007, with 714th Anti-Armored Helicopter Squadron as part of it and with other two squadrons of 119th Helicopter Brigade being merged in to single 119th Mixed Helicopter Squadron which is continuing the tradition of disbanded Brigade/Regiment with same number.

The commanders of the regiment and brigade in this period were Nikola Petrović, Svetozar Popović, Jovan Nikolić, Vojislav Milić and Miroslav Đurić.

== Assignments ==
- Command of Yugoslav Air Force (1945–1959)
- 1st Air Command (1959–1964)
- 1st Aviation Corps (1964–1966)
  - Disbanded
- 1st Aviation Corps (1968–1986)
- 3rd Corps of Air Force and Air Defense (1986–1991)
- Aviation Corps (1992–2006)

== Previous designations ==
- 1st Transport Aviation Regiment (1945–1948)
- 119th Transport Aviation Regiment (1948–1961)
- 119th Support Aviation Regiment (1961–1966)
  - Disbanded
- 119th Transport Helicopter Regiment (1968–1973)
- 119th Support Aviation Regiment (1973–1978)
- 119th Transport Aviation Regiment (1978–1981)
- 119th Aviation Brigade (1981–1991)
- 119th Transport Helicopter Regiment (1992–1996)
- 119th Helicopter Brigade (1996–2006)

== Organization ==
=== 1961 ===
- 119th Support Aviation Regiment
  - 675th Transport Aviation Squadron
  - 676th Transport Aviation Squadron
  - 677th Transport Aviation Squadron
  - 678th Transport Aviation Squadron
  - 679th Transport Aviation Squadron
  - 783rd Helicopter Squadron
  - 890th Liaison Aviation Squadron

=== 1961–1966 ===
- 119th Support Aviation Regiment
  - 675th Transport Aviation Squadron
  - 676th Transport Aviation Squadron
  - 783rd Helicopter Squadron
  - 890th Liaison Aviation Squadron

=== 1968–1973 ===
- 119th Transport Helicopter Regiment
  - 787th Transport Helicopter Squadron
  - 789th Transport Helicopter Squadron

=== 1973–1981 ===
- 119th Support Aviation Regiment/Transport Aviation Regiment (since 1978)
  - 787th Transport Helicopter Squadron
  - 789th Transport Helicopter Squadron
  - 677th Transport Aviation Squadron

=== 1981–1991 ===
- 119th Aviation Brigade
  - 787th Transport Helicopter Squadron
  - 789th Transport Helicopter Squadron (1990)
  - 677th Transport Aviation Squadron
  - 712nd Anti-Armored Helicopter Squadron
  - 714th Anti-Armored Helicopter Squadron (since 1988)

=== 1992–2006 ===
- 119th Transport Helicopter Regiment/Helicopter Brigade (since 1996)
  - 787th Transport Helicopter Squadron
  - 712nd Anti-Armored Helicopter Squadron
  - 714th Anti-Armored Helicopter Squadron

== Bases stationed ==
- Zemun (1945–1963)
- Batajnica Air Base (1963–1966)
- Niš Airport (1968–2006)

== Commanding officers ==
Date appointed	Name
	Dimitrije Kovijanić
	Vladimir Simić
	Berislav Supek
	Nikola Rodić
	Dimitrije Kovačević
	Mido Rakočević
	Nikola Đurđević
	Matija Macut
	Svetozar Popović
	Jovan Nikolić
	Vojislav Milić
	Miroslav Đurić

== Equipment ==
- Lisunov Li-2 and Li-3 (1945–1966)
- Junkers Ju 52 (1945–1961)
- Douglas C-47 Skytrain (1953–1966, 1968–1976)
- Westland-Sikorsky WS-51 Mk.1B (1954–1966)
- Ikarus Kurir (1955–1966)
- Mil Mi-8 (1968–2006)
- Antonov An-2 (1976–1991)
- Antonov An-26 (1976–1991)
- Soko SA.341 Gazelle/SA.342 Gama (1982–2006)

== Bibliography ==
- Yugoslav Air Force 1942–1992, Bojan Dimitrijevic, Belgrade 2006
