= 789 Squadron =

789 Squadron may refer to:

- 789 Naval Air Squadron, United Kingdom
- 789th Bombardment Squadron, later 789th Tactical Fighter Squadron, United States
- 789th Radar Squadron, United States
- 789th Transport Helicopter Squadron, Yugoslavia
