= 895th Helicopter Reconnaissance and Liaison Squadron =

895th Helicopter Reconnaissance and Liaison Squadron: 895. helikopterska eskadrila za izviđanje i vezu
- Active: 1981 - 1991
- Disbanded: 1991
- Country: Yugoslavia
- Branch: Yugoslav Air Force
- Type: Squadron
- Role: Liaison
- Part of: Naval Military District
- Garrison/HQ: Divulje
- Engagements: Yugoslav wars

The 895th Helicopter Reconnaissance and Liaison Squadron (Serbo-Croatian: 895. helikopterska eskadrila za izviđanje i vezu / 895. хеликоптерска ескадрила за извиђање и везу) was an aviation squadron of Yugoslav Air Force formed in 1981 at Divulje air base 895th Helicopter Flight (Serbo-Croatian: 895. helikoptersko odeljenje / 895. хеликоптерско одељење).

The helicopter flight was formed by order from August 18, 1981, for with Naval Military District (Serbo-Croatian: Vojno-pomorska oblast - VPO / Војно-поморска област - ВПО) of Yugoslav Navy for reconnaissance and liaison duties equipped with domestic made Soko SA,341 Gazelle helicopters. By order from March 1, 1985, it is designated as 895th Helicopter Reconnaissance and Liaison Squadron.

The squadron took part in early combat operations in the Croatian war. It has moved from Divulje to Mostar airport and later finally to Golubovci Air Base in 1991 due to the order of the High Command of the Yugoslav Air Force, due to the units that found itself located in hostile territory surrounded by Croatian forces had to evacuate its units to safer territory. With war time reorganisation of Yugoslav People's Army, shortly after its dislocation, squadron has been disbanded in 1991. Its equipment and personnel were passed to other units of Yugoslav Air Force.

== Assignments ==
- Naval Military District (1981–1991)

== Previous designations ==
- 895th Helicopter Flight (1981-1985)
- 895th Helicopter Reconnaissance and Liaison Squadron (1985-1991)

== Bases stationed ==
- Divulje (1981–1991)
- Mostar (1991)
- Golubovci (1991)

== Equipment ==
- Soko SA.341 Gazelle Hera (1981–1991)
