= 780th Transport Helicopter Squadron =

780th Transport Helicopter Squadron: 780. transportna helikopterska eskadrila
- Active: October, 1960–1992
- Disbanded: 1992
- Country: Yugoslavia
- Branch: Yugoslav Air Force; Republika Srpska Air Force
- Type: Squadron
- Role: Helicopter
- Part of: 92nd Mixed Aviation Brigade
- Garrison/HQ: Zalužani
- Engagements: War in Slovenia; War in Croatia; War in Bosnia

The 780th Transport Helicopter Squadron (Serbo-Croatian: 780. transportna helikopterska eskadrila / 780. транспортна хеликоптерска ескадрила) was a helicopter squadron of Yugoslav Air Force and later Republika Srpska Air Force formed in October 1960 as 34th Helicopter Squadron (Serbo-Croatian: 34. helikopterska eskadrila / 34. хеликоптерска ескадрила).

== History ==
The 48th Helicopter Squadron was formed at Niš airport in October 1960 as part of 107th Helicopter Regiment. It was equipped with Soviet-made Mil Mi-4 transport helicopters.

By the April 1961 and application of the "Drvar" reorganization for the Air Force, new type designation system is used to identify squadrons, so the 34th Helicopter Squadron has become 780th Transport Helicopter Squadron.

Squadron has been moved to Pleso airport near Zagreb by 1964, being reassigned to 111th Support Aviation Regiment. By 1973 the Mil Mi-4 helicopters were replaced with newer Soviet Mil Mi-8T transport helicopters.

In 1990 due to the "Jedinstvo 3" reorganization plan, 781st Transport Helicopter Squadron of same 111th Aviation Brigade was disbanded. Personnel and equipment were attached to 780th squadron.

The squadron has been introduced in the war in Slovenia from the first days. One Mi-8T was shot down by Slovenian Territorial Defence forces on the afternoon of 27 June 1991, killing all three pilots. As the war in Croatia intensified, the 111th Aviation Brigade found itself located in hostile territory surrounded by Croatian forces, the High Command of the Yugoslav Air Force ordered the evacuation of its units to safer territory, so three of its helicopter squadrons were re-located to Zalužani near Banja Luka and reorganized in to Helicopter Regiment with two squadrons.

780th Squadron had an important role during the early war in Croatia and Bosnia and Herzegovina, being used for the transport of troops, ammunition, the evacuation of civilians, CSAR and MEDEVAC missions.

On May 12, 1992 111th Helicopter Regiment with its two squadrons became part of newly formed Bosnian Serbs Air Force. On 26 July 1992, just two months after the initial structure of the Republika Srpska Air Force was established, the flying units were once again reorganized. The 111th Helicopter Regiment was disbanded, and a new unit designated the 92nd Mixed Aviation Brigade was formed to control both fixed-wing and helicopter squadrons.

Later in the same year, both 780th Transport Helicopter Squadron and the 711th Anti-Armored Helicopter Squadron have been disbanded and were merged to create the new 89th Mixed Helicopter Squadron.

== Assignments ==
- 107th Helicopter Regiment (Support, Mixed) (1960–1973)
- 111th Support Aviation Regiment (Transport, Aviation Brigade, Helicopter Regiment) (1973–1992)
- 92nd Mixed Aviation Brigade (1992)

== Previous designations ==
- 34th Helicopter Squadron (1960–1961)
- 780th Transport Helicopter Squadron (1961–1992)

== Bases stationed ==
- Niš (1960–1964)
- Pleso (1964–1991)
- Zalužani (1991–1992)

== Equipment ==
- Mil Mi-4 (1960–1973)
- Mil Mi-8T (1973–1992)
