= Ikarus 214 =

Military aircraft produced in Yugoslavia

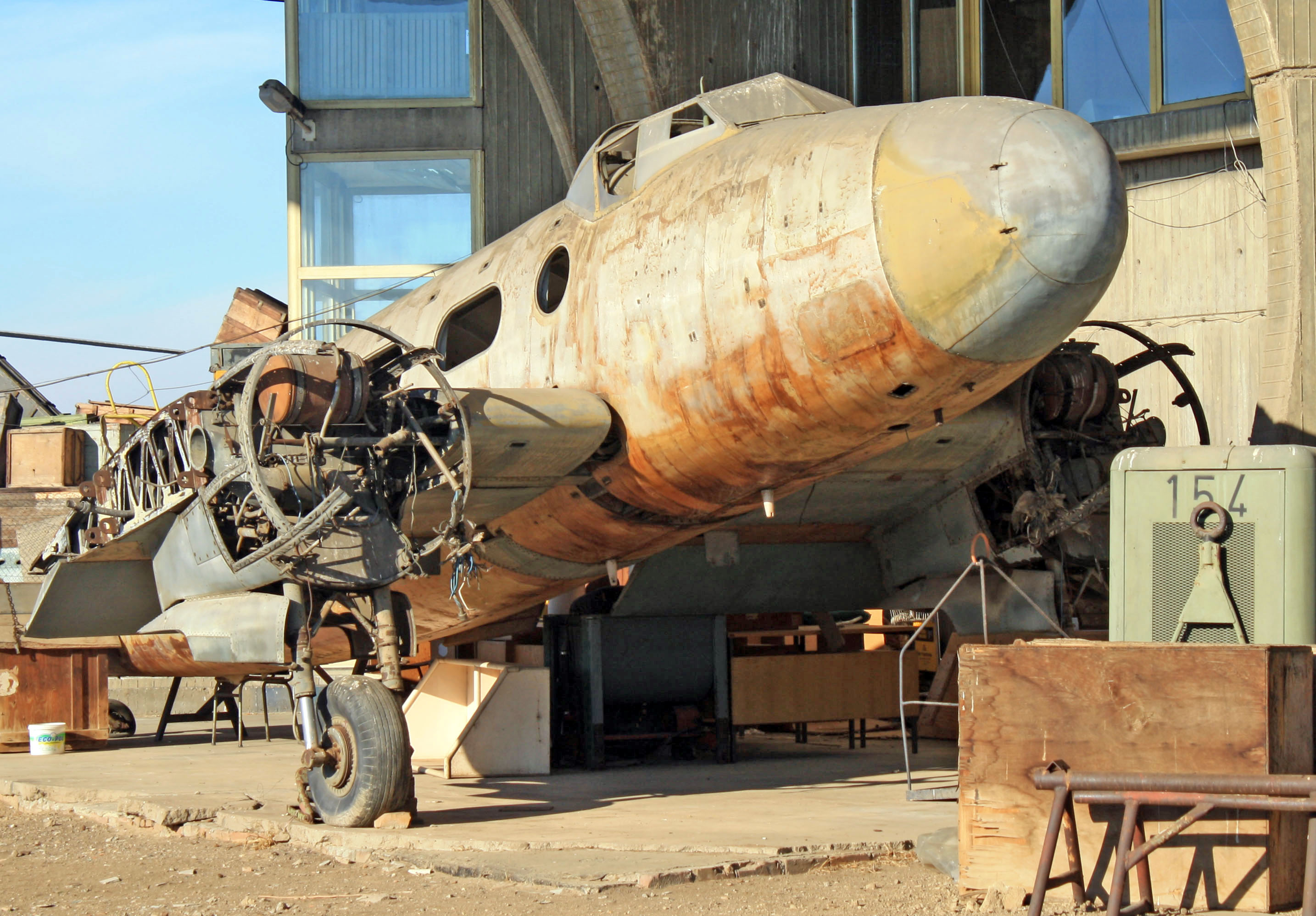
- Located in the Aviation Museum in Belgrade, this wreckage of a Ikarus 214-PP is the only surviving example of the Ikarus 214 family

General information
- Type: Military trainer
- National origin: Yugoslavia
- Manufacturer: Ikarus
- Designer: Sima Milutinović
- Primary user: Yugoslav Air Force
- Number built: 20+ 2 prototypes

History
- Manufactured: 1949-1959
- Introduction date: 1949
- First flight: 1949
- Retired: 1970

The Ikarus 214 was a military aircraft produced in Yugoslavia in the early 1950s. Originally intended as a light reconnaissance-bomber, it was produced as a trainer and transport aircraft when the testing of the prototype showed it had insufficient performance for the reconnaissance-bomber role.

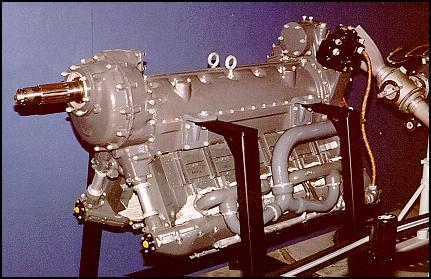
A Ranger V-770 engine, as installed on the Ikarus 214 prototype

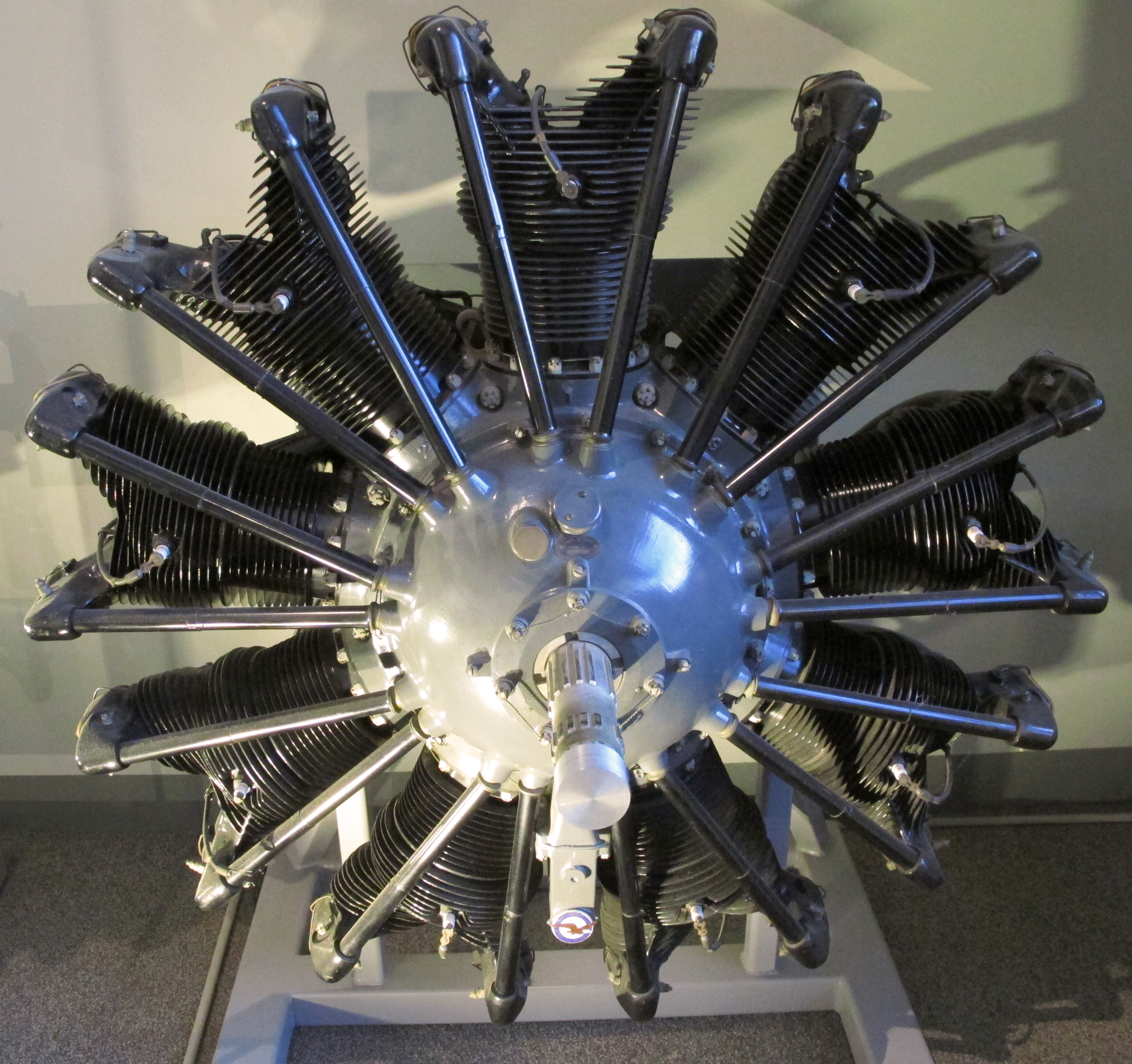
A Pratt and Whitney Wasp engine, as installed on production Ikarus 214 aircraft

== Development ==
A conventional, low-wing cantilever monoplane with twin tail, the Ikarus 214 was designed by Professor constructor Simo Milutinovic, and first flew on 7 August 1949. The aircraft was of wooden construction, twin-engined, with a crew of two to four depending on the mission/role of the aircraft. The main landing gear wheels retracted into the engine nacelles of the two Ranger SVG-770C-B1 inverted V-12 piston engines. Serial production aircraft were powered by 2x Pratt & Whitney R-1340AN-1 radial engines.

Unlike production aircraft, the first prototype had fixed landing gear, due to delays in development of the retractable undercarriage. On the first test flight one engine failed, the pilot, Lieutenant Nikola Simic, attempted to return to the airport at Zemun, but the aircraft lost altitude and crashed near the Ikarus factory, killing the pilot. Analysis concluded that the accident was caused by a combination of failure of the propeller feathering mechanism, high drag to the landing gear, small fin area, asymmetric thrust and limited engine power.

The second prototype with the same engines, retractable landing gear and increased vertical tail surfaces flew in 1951. This aircraft was used, after flight test was completed, by the JRV until 10 October 1957. The revised version for photo-reconnaissance, designated Ikarus 214F, flew until 1959 when it was written off after an accident.

== Operational history ==
A total of 22 aircraft, two prototypes and series production of only 20 meant the Ikarus 214 was not widely used, flight testing having revealed that the 214 could not meet the requirements of a light twin-engine bomber.

The Ikarus 214AS trainer was mainly used as a crew trainer for bomber pilots and navigators.

The Ikarus 214D transport variant of the aircraft could carry up to 8 passengers or parachutists.

Naval reconnaissance versions were limited, by a lack of suitable equipment, to mission in daylight and good weather conditions.

Two aircraft were equipped to carry out maritime reconnaissance and anti-submarine warfare as the Ikarus 214PP, and Ikarus 214AM2.

All Ikarus 214 aircraft were withdrawn from military service by 1967.

Six aircraft were donated to the Aeronautical Union of Yugoslavia, continuing to fly in aero-clubs at Ljubljana, Zagreb, Novi Sad, Vrsac, Skopje and Sarajevo, for transport and parachute jumps. All civilian 214s were withdrawn from service during the 1970s.

Although not entirely successful in its intended role the Ikarus 214 gained a good reputation from parachute jumpers at the aero-clubs.

== Variants ==
Ikarus 214
prototype with Ranger SVG-770C-B1 inline engines,
Ikarus 214D
with Pratt & Whitney R-1340-AN-1 radial engines,
Ikarus 214AS
training aircraft,
Ikarus 214F
reconnaissance aircraft for photo reconnaissance,
Ikarus 214PP
anti-submarine aircraft,
Ikarus 214АМ2
improved version of the anti-submarine aircraft.

== Operators ==
Yugoslavia

- Yugoslav Air Force
  - 570th Anti-Submarine Aviation Squadron (1961-1964)
  - 571st Anti-Submarine Aviation Squadron (1961-1964)
  - 679th Transport Aviation Squadron (1961-1966)

== Surviving aircraft ==
A single Ikarus 214 has been preserved at the Museum of Aviation at Belgrade Airport.

== Specifications ==
Data from

General characteristics

- Crew: One or two pilots
- Capacity: 8 passengers
- Length: 11.20 m (38 ft 9 in)
- Wingspan: 16.20 m (53 ft 2 in)
- Height: 3.95 m (13 ft 0 in)
- Wing area: 29.80 m^{2} (321 sq ft)
- Empty weight: 3,965 kg (3,741 lb)
- Gross weight: 5,025 kg (11,078 lb)
- Powerplant: 2 × Pratt & Whitney R-1340-AN-1 , 450 kW (600 hp) each

Performance

- Maximum speed: 365 km/h (227 mph, 197 kn)
- Range: 1,080 km (670 mi, 580 nmi)
- Service ceiling: 7,000 m (23,000 ft)

Armament

- Guns: 3 × MG-15 (second prototype)
- Bombs: 4 × 50 kg

== See also ==
Sima Milutinović Aircraft of comparable role, configuration, and era

- Siebel Si 204
