= 122nd Hydroplane Liaison Squadron =

122nd Hydroplane Liaison Squadron: 122. hidroavijacijska eskadrila za vezu
- Active: July 24, 1949 – June 8, 1968
- Disbanded: June 8, 1968
- Country: Yugoslavia
- Branch: Yugoslav Navy; Yugoslav Air Force
- Type: Squadron
- Role: Liaison
- Part of: 97th Support Aviation Regiment
- Garrison/HQ: Divulje

The 122nd Hydroplane Liaison Squadron (Serbo-Croatian: 122. hidroavijacijska eskadrila za vezu / 122. хидроавијацијска ескадрила за везу) was an aviation squadron of Yugoslav Air Force formed on July 24, 1949, as 122nd Hydroplane Section (Serbo-Croatian: 122. hidroavijacijsko odeljenje/ 122. хидроавијацијско одељење) as part of Yugoslav Navy.

== History ==
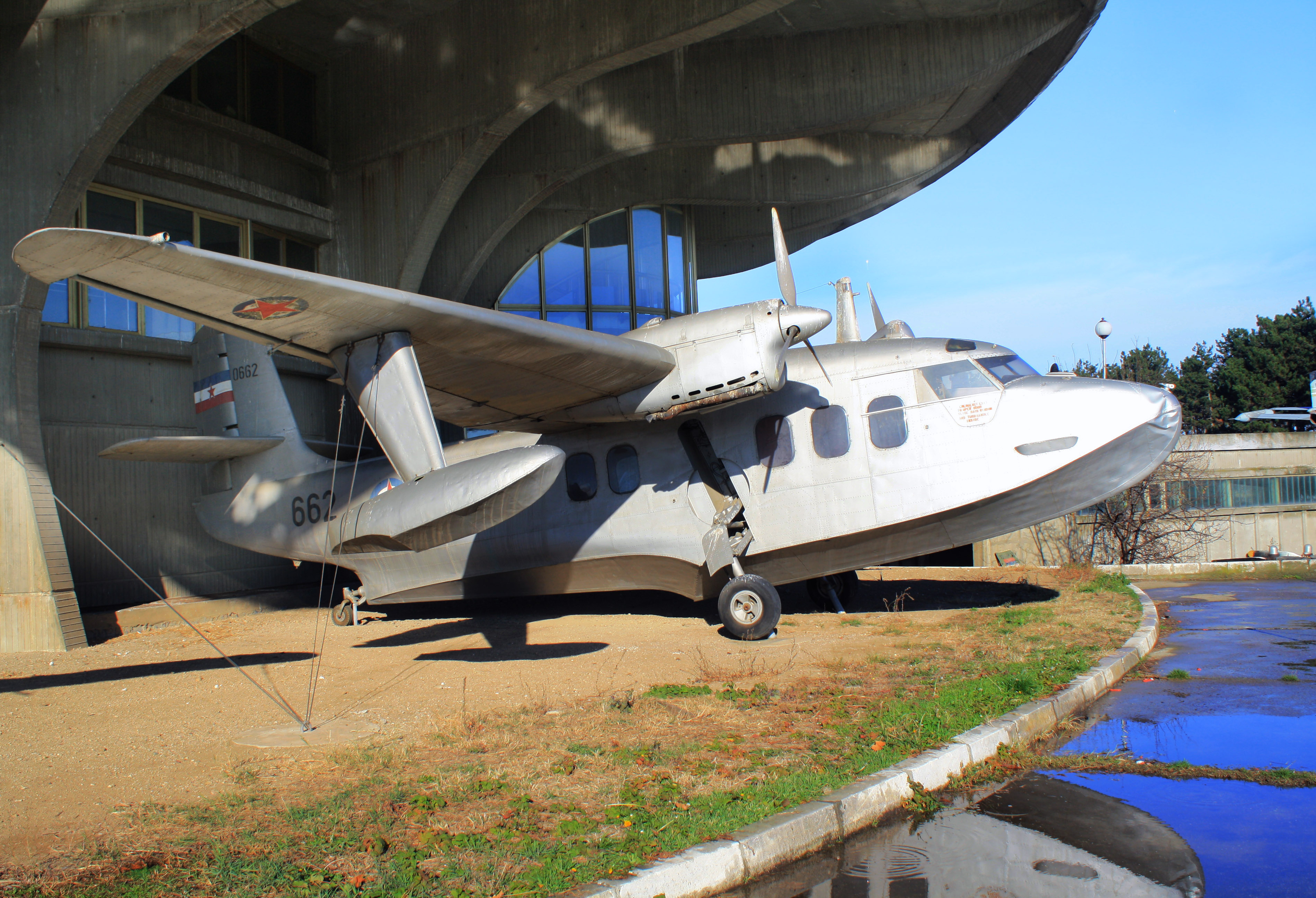
Short SA-6 Sealand Mk.I of Yugoslav Air Force which served in 122nd Hydroplane Liaison Squadron from 1951 to 1962, now at Belgrade Aviation Museum.

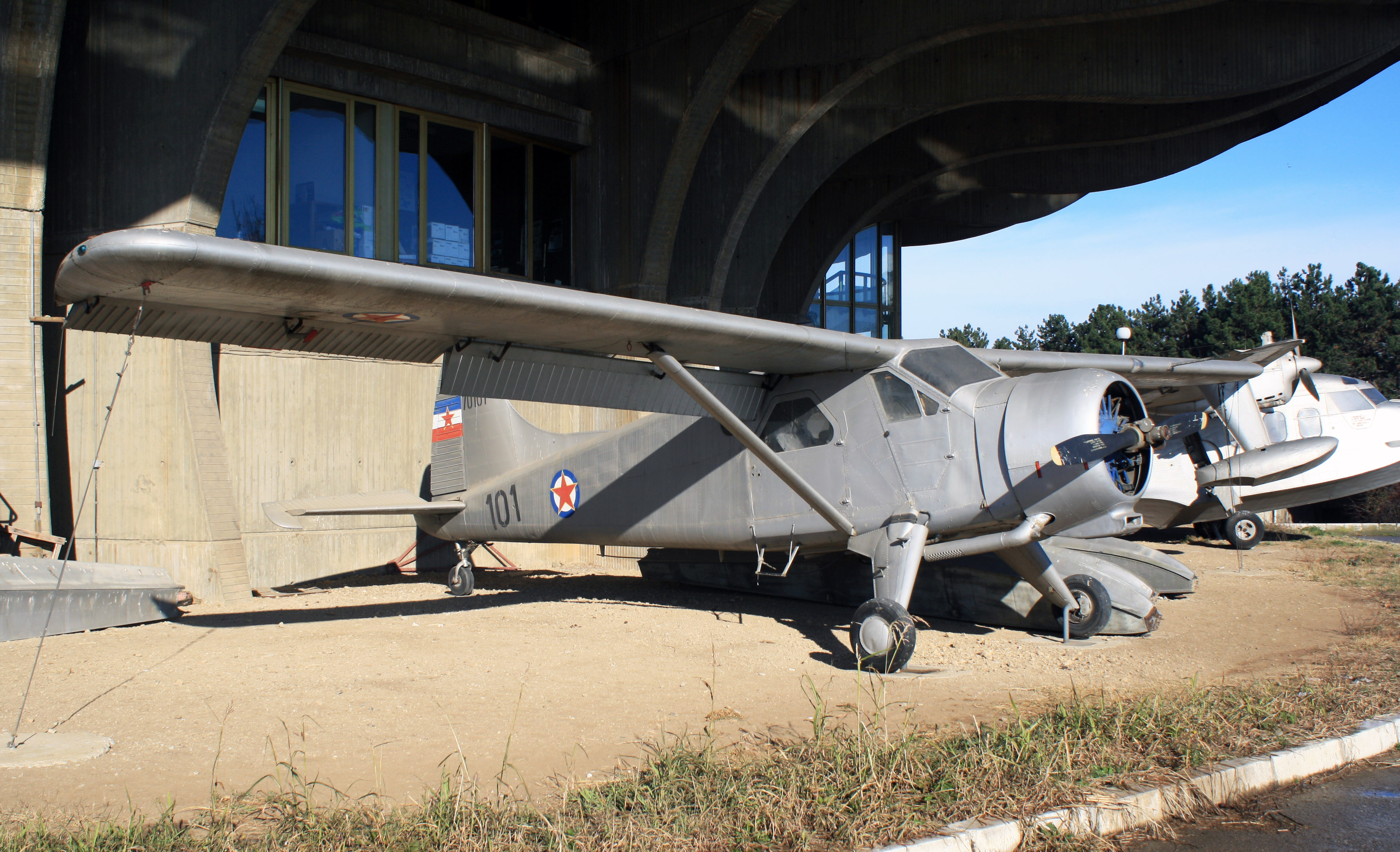
deHavilland Canada DHC-2 "Beaver" Mk.I of Yugoslav Air Force which served in 122nd Hydroplane Liaison Squadron from 1954 to 1968, now at Belgrade Aviation Museum.

Formed at Divulje, squadron has been based during its whole existence. In the first period as section, it was part of Yugoslav Navy, but later on December 17, 1951, when it has merged with hydro base of 21st Aviation Division, being attached to same division of Air Force.

Squadron was equipped with older captured German and newer Yugoslav-made and British hydroplanes. During the 1954, squadron has received two British-made Westland WS-51 Mk.1b "Dragonfly" helicopters.

It was disbanded by order from June 8, 1968. It has become 3rd Section of 784th Anti-Submarine Helicopter Squadron.

== Assignments ==
- Yugoslav Navy (1949–1951)
- 21st Aviation Division (1951–1959)
- 9th Air Command (1959-1964)
- 5th Aviation Corps (1964-1966)
- 97th Support Aviation Regiment (1966-1968)

== Previous designations ==
- 122nd Hydroplane Section (1949–1951)
- 122nd Hydroplane Liaison Squadron (1951–1968)

== Bases stationed ==
- Divulje (1949-1968)

== Equipment ==
- Aero 2H (1949–1959)
- Fieseler Fi 156 (1949-1958)
- Short SA-6 Sealand Mk.I (1951-1962)
- DHC-2 "Beaver" Mk.I (1954-1968)
- UTVA-60H (1964-1968)
- WS-51 Mk.1b "Dragonfly" (1954-1966)
