= 713th Anti-Armored Helicopter Squadron =

713th Anti-Armored Helicopter Squadron: 713. protivoklopna helikopterska eskadrila
- Active: 1988 – 1991
- Disbanded: 1991
- Country: Yugoslavia
- Branch: Yugoslav Air Force
- Type: Squadron
- Role: Anti-Armored
- Part of: 111th Aviation Brigade
- Garrison/HQ: Pleso

The 713th Anti-Armored Helicopter Squadron (Serbo-Croatian: 713. protivoklopna helikopterska eskadrila / 713. противоклопна хеликоптерска ескадрила) was a helicopter squadron of the Yugoslav Air Force formed in 1988 by an order dating from February 28, 1986.

The squadron was established at Pleso airport as part of the 111th Aviation Brigade.

It was equipped with domestic-made Gazelle Gama anti-tank helicopters.

As the war in Croatia intensified, the brigade found itself located in a hostile territory surrounded by Croatian forces. The High Command of the Yugoslav Air Force ordered evacuation of its units to a safer territory. As a result, three of its helicopter squadrons were re-located to Zalužani near Banja Luka and reorganized in to Helicopter Regiment with two squadrons. The 713th Anti-Armored Helicopter Squadron was disbanded and absorbed by the 711th Anti-Armored Helicopter Squadron.

== Assignments ==
- 111th Aviation Brigade (1988–1991)

== Bases stationed ==
- Pleso/Lučko (1988–1991)
- Zalužani (1991)

== Equipment ==
- Soko SA.341 Gazelle/SA.342 Gama (1988–1991)
