= Slatina Air Base =

Air base

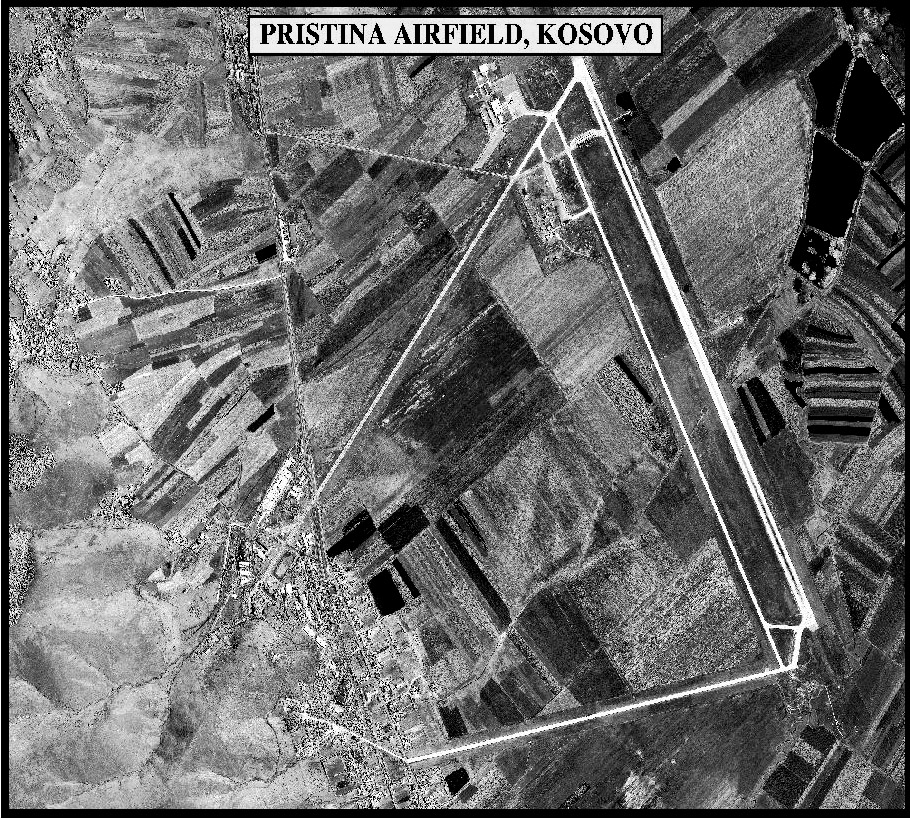
- IATA: PRN; ICAO: BKPR

Summary
- Airport type: Military/Public
- Owner: Kosovo
- Operator: KFOR Ministry of Defense
- Serves: Pristina
- Location: Slatina, Kosovo
- Elevation AMSL: 545 m / 1,789 ft
- Coordinates: 42°34′22″N 021°02′09″E

Map

Runways
Direction	Length		Surface
Direction	m	ft	Surface
17/35	2,501	8,210	Asphalt

Slatina Air Base (Albanian: Aeroporti Sllatina; Serbian: Аеродром Слатина / Aerodrom Slatina), located at Pristina International Airport Adem Jashari, contained the second largest military underground hangar complex (called Objekat Morava) in the former Yugoslavia. After the NATO bombing of Yugoslavia, the airfield was used by KFOR. Part of the complex was radar station at Golesh mountain.

Before the Yugoslav military withdrawal, Slatina was home to the 83rd Fighter Aviation Regiment and its 123rd and 124th squadrons. These squadrons were equipped with MiG-21 Bis and MiG-21 UM aircraft.

== Historical value of the air base ==
During NATO's operation against Yugoslavia the 83rd fighter squadron of Yugoslavian Air Forces was based in Slatina.

The Slatina air base was a strategically important base which NATO had planned to use for airlifting of much of their military units in support of the UNSF Resolution 1244. Control over the airport was to be established on 12 June 1999 though on that first night the air base was seized by a battalion of Russian paratroopers.

The air base is featured in the 2019 action film The Balkan Line.

== See also ==
- Željava Air Base
- KFOR
