= 83rd Fighter Aviation Regiment =

83rd Fighter Aviation Regiment: 83. lovački avijacijski puk
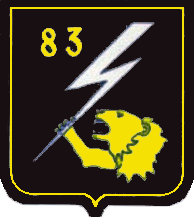
- Unit's badge since the 1990s
- Active: 1944-1964; 1968-1999
- Disbanded: 1964 and 1999
- Country: Soviet Union; Yugoslavia; Yugoslavia
- Branch: Soviet Air Force; Yugoslav Air Force; Yugoslav Air Force
- Type: Regiment; Brigade
- Role: Fighter
- Part of: Air Defense Corps
- Engagements: Kosovo War

The 83rd Fighter Aviation Regiment (Serbo-Croatian: 83. lovački avijacijski puk / 83. ловачки авијацијски пук) was an aviation regiment established in 1944 as 1st Yugoslav Fighter Regiment (Serbo-Croatian: 1. jugoslovenski vazduhoplovni lovački puk / 1. југословенски ваздухопловни ловачки пук, Russian: 1-й Югославский истребительный авиационный полк) formed from Yugoslav partisan aviators on training in Soviet Union.

== History ==
=== 1st Yugoslav Fighter Regiment ===
The 1st Yugoslav Fighter Regiment was formed on 14 October 1944 in Krasnodar, USSR, from Yugoslav partisan aviators sent on training by October 1944. It consisted from three squadrons equipped with new Yak-3 fighter aircraft. It had 180 personnel, which from five were staff officers, 37 pilots, 37 mechanics, and others. By the end of training and arming with Yak's regiment became operational by May 1, 1945. It has moved from USSR taking off by September 7, 1945, and land in Yugoslavia by 14 September at Zemun airport. Two days later it was renamed in to 254th Fighter Aviation Regiment.

The commander of regiment was Petar Radević and commissar was Viktor Bubanj.

=== 254th Fighter Aviation Regiment ===
The 254th Fighter Aviation Regiment was formed on 16 September 1945 by renaming of 1st Yugoslav Fighter Regiment at Zemun airport. It was part of 3rd Air Fighter Division.

Because of the crisis at Northwest of county, it has dislocated to Novi Sad by Spring of 1946, and to Ljubljana by Summer-Autumn same year. On 9 August 1946 a pair of Yak-3 aircraft piloted by the Lieutenant Dragan Zečević and Warrant Officer Dragan Stanisavljević have open fire and hit USAF C-47 which has violated Yugoslav airspace flow over Ljubljana airport at 12 p.m. which has forced landing 12 km near Kranj. One passenger, Turkish captain was wounded by hit, while crew and passengers were captured by Yugoslav Army. Later it was released by August 22, and the tension made with this incident and another one shooting down of USAF C-47 with fatal consequences for whole crew of five airmen was reduced after Marshal Tito ordered to pay $150.000 to families of killed US airmen. By winter, it moved to Mostar and then again in 1947 across Novi Sad to Ljubljana and Cerklje where it stayed during late 1947 and 1948.

By 1948 this regiment was renamed like all other units of Yugoslav Army, so it has become 83rd Fighter Aviation Regiment.

The commanders of regiment in this period were Petar Radević, Đorđe Kešeljević, Radovan Daković and Radovan Krstić.

=== 83rd Fighter and Fighter-Bomber Aviation Regiment ===
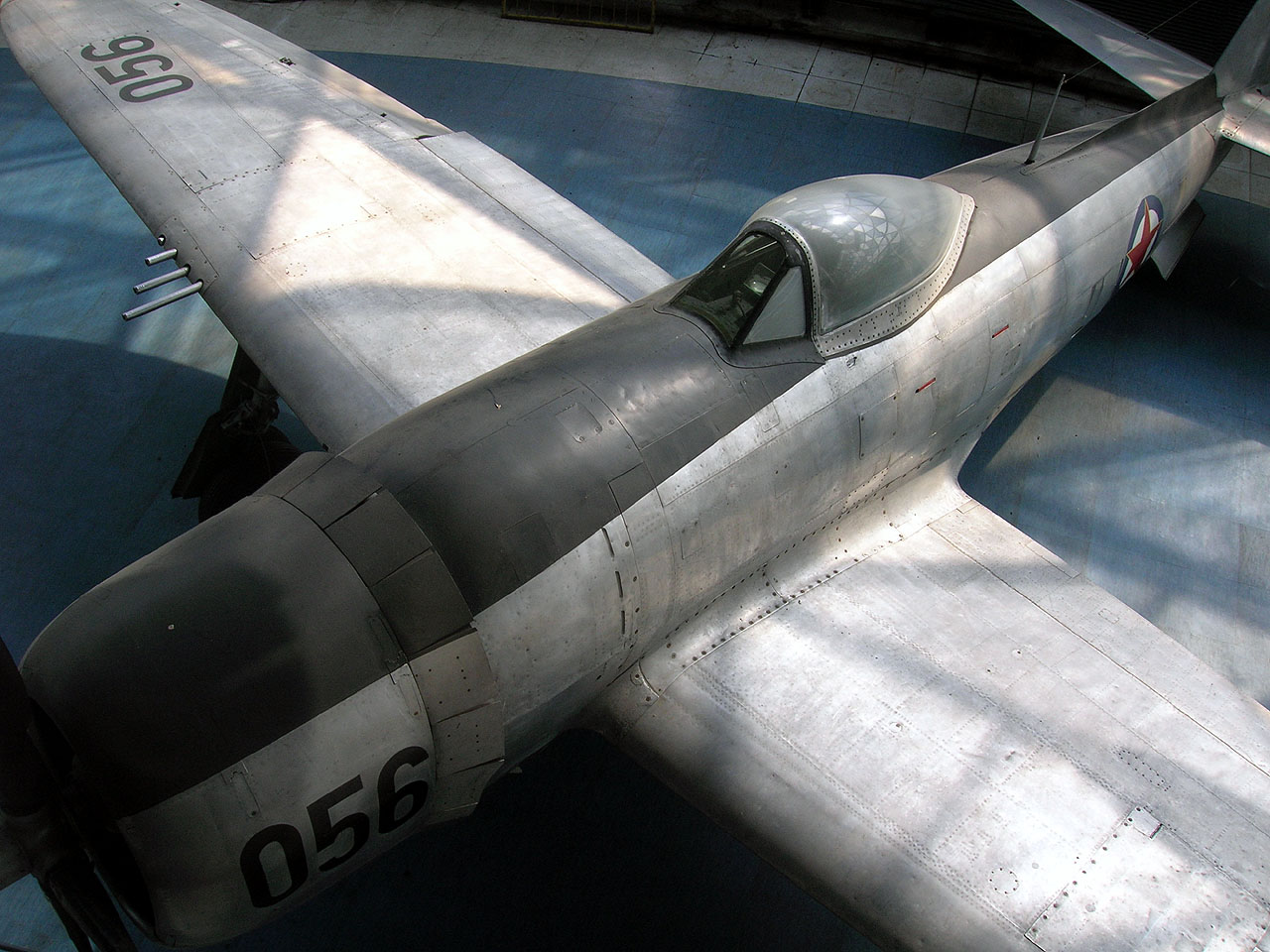
F-47D Thunderbolt fighter which has served with 83rd Aviation Regiment, now at Belgrade Aviation Museum.

The 83rd Fighter Aviation Regiment remained at Cerklje until 1948, but same year it was relocated to Pula, where it remained until 1953 when it was supposed to relocate to Zemunik, but it was again sent to Cerklje due to the Trieste crisis. It was at Cerklje airport from October 1953 to February 1954 when it was dislocated to Zemunik, where it remained until 1963. In that year the regiment was relocated to Golubovci airbase.

In late 1948 and early 1949 regiment was equipped with 40 former Bulgarian Air Force German made Messerschmitt Bf 109G aircraft. In period of exploitation of Gustav's number of accidents has been an increase, some fatal disasters taking casualties. By the 1952 Yak-3 and Bf 109G aircraft were replaced with US-build F-47D Thunderbolt fighters. In that period regiment was renamed to 83rd Fighter-Bomber Aviation Regiment (Serbo-Croatian: 83. lovačko-bombarderski avijacijski puk / 83. ловачко-бомбардерски авијацијски пук). In 1954 Thunderbolts were replaced by Republic F-84 Thunderjet fighter-bombers, which remain in service with regiment until 1959 when it was replaced with F-86E Sabre jet fighters. Same year has changed its name back to 83rd Fighter Aviation Regiment.

By the 1961 and application of the "Drvar" reorganization for the Air Force, new type designation system is used to identify squadrons, so the two squadrons of 83rd Fighter Aviation Regiment have become 120th and 121st Fighter Aviation Squadron.

It was disbanded by 1964 due to the "Drvar 2" reorganization plan. Its 121st Fighter Aviation Squadron was also disbanded, while its 120th Fighter Aviation Squadron remain as independent in 1st Air Corps until it was reorganized and renamed in to 242nd Fighter-Bomber Aviation Squadron.

The commanders of regiment in this period were Miloš Milikić, Ante Sardelić, Radovan Krstić and Nikola Vučević.

=== Re-establishment of 83rd Fighter Aviation Regiment ===
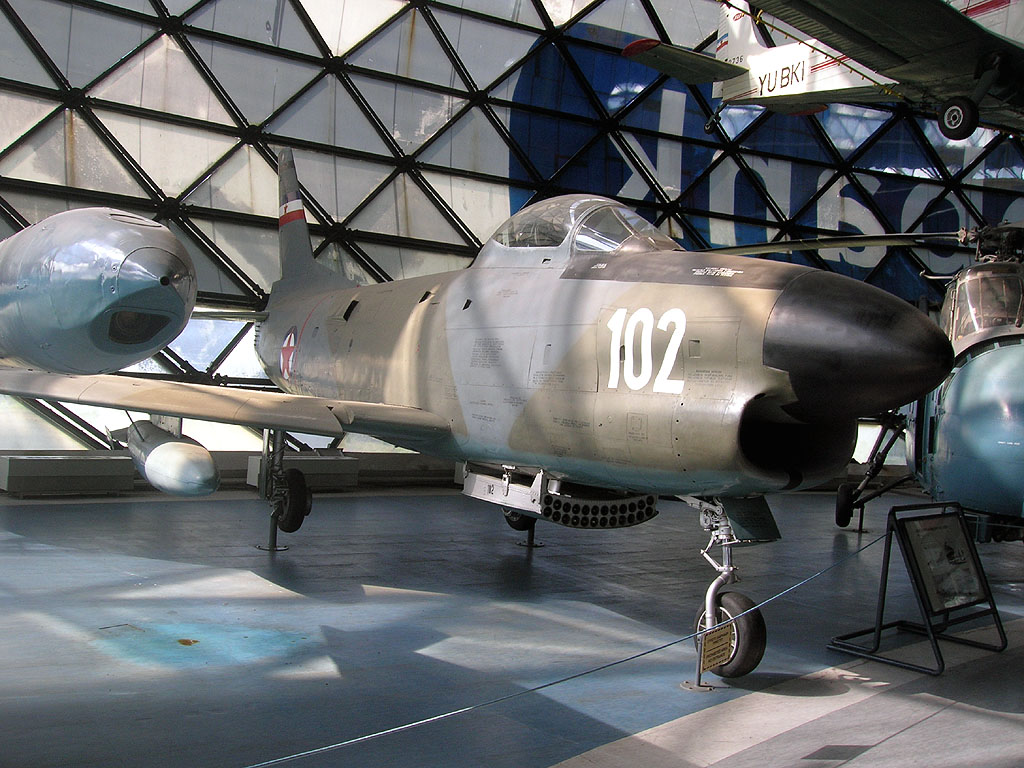
North American F-86D Sabre jet fighter which has served with 83rd Fighter Aviation Regiment in period from 1968 to 1970, now at Belgrade Aviation Museum.

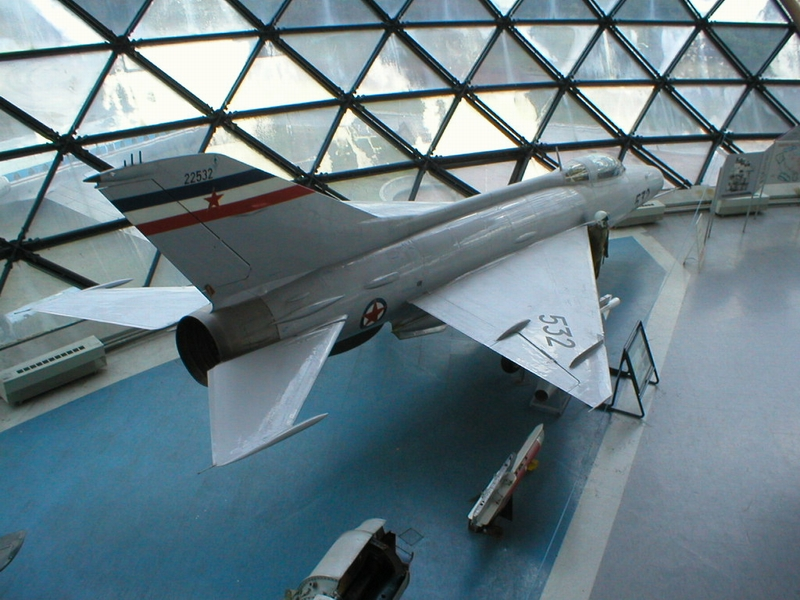
MiG-21F-13 jet fighter which has served with 83rd Fighter Aviation Regiment in period from 1971 to 1977, now at Belgrade Aviation Museum.

By the order from January 20, 1968, the 83rd Fighter Aviation Regiment was re-established on October 5 of same year at Skopski Petrovac airport. It was formed from 123rd Fighter Aviation Squadron armed with North American F-86D Sabre jet fighters. It was renamed in to 83rd Aviation Brigade (Serbo-Croatian: 83. avijacijska brigada / 83. авијацијска бригада) and dislocated to new build Slatian airbase near Priština. It was the second largest military airport with underground hangar complex in Yugoslavia, after Želajva airbase. For the existence of the regiment, it remain its base for longest period.

The first Mikoyan-Gurevich MiG-21 Fishbed in F-13 variant were introduced by 1970, and Sabers were withdrawn from Brigade by 1974. Newer variant MiG-21PMF has replaced F-13's by 1977, and the MiG-21 bis variants were introduced in 1983. The Brigade has again become Fighter Aviation Regiment by 1978.

When wars in Yugoslavia started, in period of 1991–1992, parts of 117th Fighter Aviation Regiment and 129th Fighter Aviation Squadron were merged to 83rd Fighter Aviation Regiment, which has later again become Aviation Brigade. In that period MiG-21UM training variants were introduced from merged units. After Yugoslav People's Army was officially dissolved in May 1992, the unit joined the newly formed Military of Federal Republic of Yugoslavia as part of Aviation Corps. Two years later, with new reorganization of "new" Air Force of FR Yugoslavia, Brigade become again 83rd Fighter Aviation Regiment which was part of Air Defense Corps. In that period the unit has got its official badge.

During 1999, when NATO air forces started bombing campaign against FR Yugoslavia, and Army, with its Air Force and Air Defense units were primary targets. The Slatian airbase, located near Priština, in Kosovo, was constantly under attack. Several MiG-21 aircraft of 83rd Regiment were destroyed on the ground by air strikes, but none were used in air combat, as the MiG-21's were excluded from combat operations considered as weak to confront modern NATO fighters. Several MiG-29 Fulcrum aircraft form 204th Fighter Aviation Regiment at Batajnica airbase were relocated to Slatina due to the war preparation.

After the end of NATO attacks and signing of the Treaty at Kumanovo, the all Yugoslav Forces had to retreat out from Kosovo province. On June 12, 1999, all aircraft, personnel and equipment have left hardly damaged Slatina airbase and handed it over to Russian Airborne Troops as part of KFOR. The 83rd Fighter Regiment has relocated to Batajnica airbase and there it was disbanded by the August 1999. Personnel and equipment have entered the 126th Fighter Aviation Squadron of 204th Fighter Aviation Regiment which continued the tradition of 83rd Regiment and its predecessor - 254th Fighter Aviation Regiment.

The commanders of regiment in this period were Nikola Maravić, Angel Ončevski, Branko Gajović, Tomislav Ivanović, Jovo Špegar, Mirko Vučinić, Slobodan Jeremić, Stjepan Hranjec, Zoran Milićević and Gvozden Urošević.

== Assignments ==
- 3rd Aviation Fighter Division
- 44th Aviation Division (1948–1949)
- 21st Aviation Division (1949–1959)
- 9th Air Command (1959–1964)
  - Disbanded
- 13th Air Defense Division (1968–1973)
- 11th Air Defense Division (1973–1986)
- 3rd Corps of Air Force and Air Defense (1986–1992)
- Aviation Corps (1992–1994)
- Air Defense Corps (1994–1999)

== Previous designations ==
- 1st Yugoslav Fighter Regiment (1944–1945)
- 254th Fighter Aviation Regiment (1945–1948)
- 83rd Fighter Aviation Regiment (1948–1952)
- 83rd Fighter-Bomber Aviation Regiment (1952–1959)
- 83rd Fighter Aviation Regiment (1959–1964)
  - Disbanded
- 83rd Fighter Aviation Regiment (1968–1973)
- 83rd Aviation Brigade (1973–1978)
- 83rd Fighter Aviation Regiment (1978–1992)
- 83rd Aviation Brigade (1992–1994)
- 83rd Fighter Aviation Regiment (1994–1999)

== Organization ==
=== 1961-1964 ===
- 83rd Fighter Aviation Regiment
  - 120th Fighter Aviation Squadron
  - 121st Fighter Aviation Squadron

=== 1968-1992 ===
- 83rd Fighter Aviation Regiment/Aviation Brigade
  - 123rd Fighter Aviation Squadron
  - 130th Fighter Aviation Squadron

=== 1992-1994 ===
- 83rd Aviation Brigade
  - 123rd Fighter Aviation Squadron
  - 124th Fighter Aviation Squadron
  - 130th Fighter Aviation Squadron

=== 1994-1999 ===
- 83rd Fighter Aviation Regiment
  - 123rd Fighter Aviation Squadron
  - 124th Fighter Aviation Squadron

== Bases stationed ==
- Krasnodar (1944–1945)
- Zemun (1945)
- Novi Sad (1946)
- Ljubljana (1946)
- Mostar (1946)
- Novi Sad (1947)
- Ljubljana (1946)
- Cerklje (1947–1948)
- Pula (1948–1953)
- Cerklje (1953–1954)
- Zemunik (1954–1963)
- Golubovci (1963–1964)
- Petrovec (1968–1970)
- Slatina (1970–1999)
- Batajnica (1999)

== Commanding officers ==
Date appointed	Name
	Petar Radević
	Đorđe Kešeljević
	Radovan Daković
	Radovan Krstić
	Miloš Milikić
	Ante Sardelić
	Radovan Krstić
	Nikola Vučević
	Nikola Maravić
	Angel Ončevski
	Branko Gajović
	Tomislav Ivanović
	Jovo Špegar
	Mirko Vučinić
	Slobodan Jeremić
	Stjepan Hranjec
	Zoran Milićević
	Gvozden Urošević

== Equipment ==
- Yakovlev Yak-3 (1944–1952)
- Messerschmitt Bf 109G (1948-1952)
- F-47D Thunderbolt (1952–1954)
- F-84G Thunderjet (1952–1959)
- F-86E Sabre (1959–1964)
- F-86D Sabre (1968–1974)
- MiG-21F-13 (1970–1977)
- MiG-21PMF (1977–1994)
- MiG-21bis (1983–1999)
- MiG-21UM (1991–1999)
