= 711th Anti-Armored Helicopter Squadron =

711th Anti-Armored Helicopter Squadron: 711. protivoklopna helikopterska eskadrila
- Active: 1982 – 1992
- Disbanded: 1992
- Country: Yugoslavia
- Branch: Yugoslav Air Force; Republika Srpska Air Force
- Type: Squadron
- Role: Anti-Armored
- Part of: 92nd Mixed Aviation Brigade
- Garrison/HQ: Zalužani

The 711th Anti-Armored Helicopter Squadron (Serbo-Croatian: 711. protivoklopna helikopterska eskadrila / 711. противоклопна хеликоптерска ескадрила) was a helicopter squadron of Yugoslav Air Force formed in 1982 by order from April 19, 1982.

Squadron was established at Pleso airport as part of 111th Aviation Brigade on the place of previously disbandend 466th Light Combat Aviation Squadron.

It was equipped with domestic-made Gazelle Gama anti-tank helicopters.

Squadron took part in combat operations during the Yugoslav wars from its beginning in 1991. With the outbreak of war in 1991 squadron was dislocated from Pleso to Lučko airport.

As the war in Croatia intensified, the brigade found itself located in hostile territory surrounded by Croatian forces, the High Command of the Yugoslav Air Force ordered the evacuation of its units to safer territory, so three of its helicopter squadrons were re-located to Zalužani near Banja Luka and reorganized in to Helicopter Regiment with two squadrons. The 713th Anti-Armored Helicopter Squadron was disbanded and absorbed by the 711th Anti-Armored Helicopter Squadron.

On May 12, 1992, 111th Helicopter Regiment with its two squadrons became part of newly formed Bosnian Serbs Air Force. On 26 July 1992, just two months after the initial structure of the Republika Srpska Air Force was established, the flying units were once again reorganized. The 111th Helicopter Regiment was disbanded, and a new unit designated the 92nd Mixed Aviation Brigade was formed to control both fixed-wing and helicopter squadrons.

Later in the same year, both 780th Transport Helicopter Squadron and the 711th Anti-Armored Helicopter Squadron have been disbanded and were merged to create the new 89th Mixed Helicopter Squadron.

== Assignments ==
- 111th Aviation Brigade (Helicopter Regiment) (1982–1992)
- 92nd Mixed Aviation Brigade (1992)

== Bases stationed ==
- Pleso (1982-1991)
- Lučko (1991)
- Zalužani (1991–1992)

== Equipment ==
- Soko SA.341 Gazelle/SA.342 Gama (1982–1992)
