= 9th Air Command =

9th Air Command: 9. vazduhoplovna komanda
- Active: 1959–1964
- Disbanded: 1964
- Country: Yugoslavia
- Branch: Yugoslav Air Force
- Type: Division
- Size: 3 regiments
- HQ: Mostar

The 9th Air Command (Serbo-Croatian: 9. vazduhoplovna komanda/ 9. ваздухопловна команда) was a joint unit of Yugoslav Air Force.

== History ==
It was established by the order from June 27, 1959, year due to the "Drvar" reorganization plan of Yugoslav Air Force from the 21st Aviation Division with command at Mostar. In 1961 it suffered a changes in the organization.

By the new "Drvar 2" reorganization plan of Yugoslav Air Force, 3rd Air Command has been disbanded. Its units were attached to 5th Aviation Corps.

The commanders of Air command was Radoje Ljubić.

== Organization ==
=== 1959-1961 ===
- 5th Air Command
    - 229th Signal Battalion
    - Liaison Squadron of 9th Air Command
    - Light Combat Aviation Squadron of 9th Air Command
    - 122nd Hydroplane Liaison Squadron
    - 16th Reconnaissance Squadron of Anti-Aircraft Artillery
  - 83rd Fighter Aviation Regiment
  - 172nd Fighter-Bomber Aviation Regiment
  - 97th Support Aviation Regiment
  - 84th Air Base
  - 171st Air Base
  - 423rd Air Base

=== 1961-1964 ===
- 5th Air Command
    - 229th Signal Battalion
    - 893rd Liaison Aviation Squadron
    - 678th Transport Aviation Squadron
    - 122nd Hydroplane Liaison Squadron
    - 16th Reconnaissance Squadron of Anti-Aircraft Artillery
  - 83rd Fighter Aviation Regiment
  - 172nd Fighter-Bomber Aviation Regiment
  - 97th Support Aviation Regiment
  - 84th Air Base
  - 171st Air Base
  - 423rd Air Base

== Headquarters ==
- Mostar

== Commanding officers ==
- Colonel Radoje Ljubić
