= 21st Aviation Division =

21st Mixed Aviation Division: 21. mešovita vazduhoplovna divizija
- Active: 1949–1959
- Disbanded: 1959
- Country: Yugoslavia
- Branch: Yugoslav Air Force
- Type: Division
- Size: 3 regiments
- HQ: Mostar

The 21st Mixed Aviation Division (Serbo-Croatian: 21. mešovita vazduhoplovna divizija/ 21. мешовита ваздухопловна дивизија) was a Yugoslav Air Force unit established in 1949.

== History ==
The 21st Mixed Aviation Division was formed in 1949 due to the plan of the expansion of Yugoslav Air Force formation.

It was an independent unit under direct command of Air Force HQ. In 1950 the division was attached to 3rd Aviation Corps.

It was disbanded by the order from June 27, 1959, year per the "Drvar" reorganization plan. It was transformed into 9th Air Command.

The commanders of division were August Canjko, Blažo Kovačević, Milenko Lipovščak and Radoje Ljubičić. Commissars were Vukota Radović and Pero Žarković until 1953.

== Assignments ==
- Command of Yugoslav Air Force (1949-1950)
- 3rd Aviation Corps (1949–1959)

== Organization ==
=== 1949-1959 ===
- 21st Mixed Aviation Assault/Fighter-Bomber Division
    - Training Squadron of 21st Aviation Division (1953–1954, 1957-1959)
    - 122nd Hydroplane Liaison Squadron (1951–1959)
  - 83rd Fighter (Fighter-Bomber) Aviation Regiment
  - 97th Bomber Aviation Regiment
  - 172nd Fighter (Fighter-Bomber) Aviation Regiment (1949–1958)
  - 204th Fighter Aviation Regiment (1949-1950)
  - 84th Air Base (1953–1959)

== Headquarters ==
- Mostar (1949-1959)

== Commanding officers ==
- Colonel August Canjko
- Colonel Blažo Kovačević
- Colonel Milenko Lipovščak
- Colonel Radoje Ljubičić

=== Political commissars ===
- Colonel Vukota Radović
- Colonel Pero Žarković
