= 678th Transport Aviation Squadron =

678th Transport Aviation Squadron: 678. transportna avijacijska eskadrila
- Active: 1961 – 1966
- Disbanded: 1966
- Country: Yugoslavia
- Branch: Yugoslav Air Force
- Type: Squadron
- Role: Transport
- Part of: 119th Support Aviation Regiment
- Garrison/HQ: Batajnica

The 678th Transport Aviation Squadron (Serbo-Croatian: 678. transportna avijacijska eskadrila / 678. транспортна авијацијска ескадрила) was an aviation squadron of Yugoslav Air Force established in April, 1961 as part of 119th Support Aviation Regiment at Zemun military airport.

It was formed from squadron equipped with US-made Douglas C-47 Skytrain cargo aircraft.

In 1961 the squadron was dislocated from Zemun airport to Mostar airport being reassigned as independent squadron of 9th Air Command. By 1964 it was reassigned to 97th Support Aviation Regiment.

The squadron has been disbanded in 1966. Its aircraft and equipment were transferred to 679th Transport Aviation Squadron of 111th Support Aviation Regiment.

== Assignments ==
- 119th Support Aviation Regiment (1961)
- 9th Air Command (1961–1964)
- 97th Support Aviation Regiment (1964–1966)

== Bases stationed ==
- Zemun (1961)
- Mostar (1961–1966)

== Equipment ==
- Douglas C-47 Skytrain (1961–1966)
