= 894th Helicopter Reconnaissance and Liaison Squadron =

894th Helicopter Reconnaissance and Liaison Squadron: 894. helikopterska eskadrila za izviđanje i vezu
- Active: 1952–1968; 1981–1991
- Disbanded: 1968; 1991
- Country: Yugoslavia
- Branch: Yugoslav Air Force
- Type: Squadron
- Role: Liaison
- Part of: 5th Army
- Garrison/HQ: Pleso
- Engagements: Yugoslav wars

The 894th Helicopter Reconnaissance and Liaison Squadron (Serbo-Croatian: 894. helikopterska eskadrila za izviđanje i vezu / 894. хеликоптерска ескадрила за извиђање и везу) was an aviation squadron of the Yugoslav Air Force formed in 1952 at Borongaj airfield as the Liaison Squadron of 5th Military district (Serbo-Croatian: Eskadrila za vezu 5. vojne oblasti / Ескадрила за везу 5. војне области).

== History ==
The squadron was formed by order from December 17, 1951, on February 1, 1952, as part of the 5th Military district. It was equipped with various training and liaison aircraft. The squadron was transformed into the Liaison Squadron of 5th Air Command (Serbo-Croatian: Eskadrila za vezu 5. vojne oblasti / Ескадрила за везу 5. војне области) by 1959. The squadron was later moved from the Borongaj airfield to the Pleso airfield.

By April 1961 and the application of the Drvar reorganization of the Air Force, a new type of designation system was used to identify squadrons, so the Liaison Squadron of 5th Air Command became the 894th Liaison Aviation Squadron.

It was equipped with domestic liaison Ikarus Kurir aircraft. In May 1961 it was reattached to the 111th Support Aviation Regiment. In 1964 the squadron moved to Lučko airport. The 894th Liaison Aviation Squadron was disbanded in 1968.

By order from August 18, 1981, the 894th Helicopter Flight (Serbo-Croatian: 894. helikoptersko odeljenje / 894. хеликоптерско одељење) was established at Pleso military airfield with the 5th Army of Yugoslav People's Army for reconnaissance and liaison duties equipped with domestic-made SOKO SA 341 Gazelle helicopters. By order from March 1, 1985, it was designated as the 894th Helicopter Reconnaissance and Liaison Squadron. Due to the 1988 reorganization of the field armies of the Yugoslav People's Army, the 894th Squadron was strengthened for one flight at Brnik airport (former 897th Helicopter Reconnaissance and Liaison Squadron).

The 894th Helicopter Reconnaissance and Liaison Squadron was engaged in the Yugoslav wars from the first day of war in Slovenia. In the afternoon of June 27, 1991, the Slovenian Territorial Defence shot down a Gazelle helicopter with an SA-7 missile over Ljubljana, killing the occupants — pilot, Captain 1st class Toni Mrlak (who was Slovenian by nationality) and Senior Sergeant Bojančo Sibinovski. They were the first victims of the Yugoslav wars. The squadron was engaged in later combat operations in Slovenia and Croatia.

It moved from Pleso to Željava Air Base near Bihać in 1991 following the order of the High Command of the Yugoslav Air Force, because the units that found themselves located in hostile territory surrounded by Croatian forces had to evacuate to safer territory. With the wartime reorganisation of the Yugoslav People's Army, shortly after its move, the squadron was disbanded in 1991. Its equipment and personnel were passed to other units of the Yugoslav Air Force and units of the Serbian Army of Krajina.

== Assignments ==
- 5th Military district (1952–1959)
- 5th Air Command (1959–1961)
- 111th Support Aviation Regiment (1961–1968)
- 5th Army (1981–1991)

== Previous designations ==
- Liaison Squadron of 5th Military district (1952–1959)
- Liaison Squadron of 5th Air Command (1959–1961)
- 894th Liaison Aviation Squadron (1961–1968)
- 894th Helicopter Flight (1981–1985)
- 894th Helicopter Reconnaissance and Liaison Squadron (1985–1991)

== Bases stationed ==
- Borongaj (1952–1959)
- Pleso (1959–1964)
- Lučko (1959–1968)
- Pleso (1981–1991)
- Željava (1991)

== Equipment ==
- Polikarpov Po-2 (1952–1959)
- Yakovlev UT-2 (1952–1956)
- Zlin 381 (1952–1959)
- Kaproni Bulgarski KB-11 Fazan (1952–1959)
- Utva Aero-3 (1959–1961)
- Ikarus Kurir (1955–1968)
- Soko SA.341 Gazelle Hera (1981–1991)
