= 355th Reconnaissance Aviation Squadron =

355th Reconnaissance Aviation Squadron: 355. izviđačka avijacijska eskadrila
- Active: June 20, 1958 – 1968
- Disbanded: 1968
- Country: Yugoslavia
- Branch: Yugoslav Air Force
- Type: Squadron
- Role: Reconnaissance
- Part of: 172nd Fighter-Bomber Aviation Regiment
- Garrison/HQ: Zemunik

The 355th Reconnaissance Aviation Squadron (Serbo-Croatian: 355. izviđačka avijacijska eskadrila / 355. извиђачка авијацијска ескадрила) was an aviation squadron of Yugoslav Air Force established on June 20, 1958, as 16th Reconnaissance Squadron of Anti-Aircraft Artillery (Serbo-Croatian: 16. izviđačka eskadrila protivavionske avijacije/ 16. извиђачка ескадрила противавионске авијације).

== History ==
Squadron was formed as reconnaissance, but its main role was pulling of aerial targets for the training of School Center of Anti-Aircraft Artillery at Zadar. It was equipped with British-made de Havilland Mosquito aircraft. By 1962 it was reequipped with US-made Lockheed TV-2 Shooting Star jet-trainer aircraft equipped for aerial reconnaissance.

Squadron was renumbered by order from May 12, 1964, in to 355th Reconnaissance Aviation Squadron, being an independent squadron for short time. In 1965 it was assigned to 172nd Fighter-Bomber Aviation Regiment.

It was disbanded in 1968.

== Assignments ==
- School Center of Anti-Aircraft Artillery (1958–1959)
- 9th Air Command (1959–1964)
- Independent (1964–1965)
- 172nd Fighter-Bomber Aviation Regiment (1965–1968)

== Previous designations ==
- 16th Reconnaissance Squadron of Anti-Aircraft Artillery (1958–1964)
- 355th Reconnaissance Aviation Squadron (1964–1968)

== Bases stationed ==
- Zemunik (1958–1968)

== Equipment ==
- de Havilland Mosquito Mk 3 (1958–1962)
- Lockheed TV-2 Shooting Star (1962–1968)
