= 111th Helicopter Regiment =

111th Helicopter Regiment: 111. helikopterski puk
- Active: 1945–1992
- Disbanded: 1992
- Country: Yugoslavia; Republika Srpska
- Branch: Yugoslav Air Force; Republika Srpska Air Force
- Type: Regiment; Brigade
- Part of: the 5th Corps of the Air Force and Air Defense
- Engagements: Syrmian Front; Yugoslav wars

The 111th Helicopter Regiment (Serbo-Croatian: 111. helikopterski puk / 82. хеликоптерски пук) was a unit established in 1944 as the 422nd Assault Aviation Regiment (Serbo-Croatian: 422. vazduhoplovni jurišni puk / 422. ваздухопловни јуришни пук).

== History ==
=== 422nd Assault Aviation Regiment ===
The regiment was established on December 4, 1944, in Novi Sad, from Yugoslav partisan aviators with the Soviet Air Force 17th Air Army's 166th Guards Assault Aviation Regiment (166.GShAP). It became independent from Soviet command and personnel in May 1945. The regiment was part of the 42nd Aviation Assault Division; it was equipped with Soviet Il-2 Shturmovik ground-attack aircraft. The regiment took part in final operations for the liberation of Yugoslavia. During combat operations, it was based at Novi Sad, Klenak, Mađarmečke and Pleso airfields.

After the war, the regiment remained at Pleso.

By 1948, the regiment was renamed, like all other units of the Yugoslav Army, becoming the 111th Assault Aviation Regiment.

The commanders of the regiment in this period were Krsta Lakićević, Hinko Šoić, Predavec and Milan Aćimović.

=== 111th Assault and Fighter-Bomber Aviation Regiment ===
The 111th Assault Aviation Regiment remained at Pleso for a short time. By 1949 it had moved to Cerklje where it was to remain until it was disbanded. In 1954 the Il-2s were replaced with US-built F-47D Thunderbolt fighters. In that period, the unit was renamed the 111th Fighter-Bomber Aviation Regiment (Serbo-Croatian: 111. lovačko-bombarderski avijacijski puk / 111. ловачко-бомбардерски авијацијски пук).

The 111th Fighter-Bomber Aviation Regiment was disbanded in March 1961.

The commanders of the regiment in this period were Milan Aćimović, Miloš Milikić, Radoje Ljubičić, Matija Macut and Petar Orešćanin.

=== Re-establishment of the 111th Regiment ===
The 111th Support Aviation Regiment was formed at Cerklje airport in April 1961 from the 679th Transport Aviation Squadron, which was equipped with Soviet-made Lisunov Li-3 transport aircraft and the 894th Liaison Aviation Squadron which operated Yugoslav-made Ikarus Kurir liaison machines.

The new 111th Regiment took the number and banner and continued the traditions of the former 111th Fighter-Bomber Aviation Regiment.

The 780th Transport Helicopter Squadron, equipped with new Soviet Mil Mi-4 helicopters, was transferred from the 107th to the 111th Regiment in 1964. The out-moded Li-3s were replaced with similar US C-47 Skytrains in 1966. By 1973, the 780th Squadron had replaced their Mi-4s with newer Mil Mi-8T helicopters. In the same year one other squadron, the 781st, also with Mi-8s, was moved from the 107th to the 111th Regiment. Meanwhile, in 1968, the regiment moved from Cerklje to Pleso airport and the 894th Liaison Aviation Squadron was disbanded. New Antonov An-26 cargo aircraft replaced the Skytrains in 1976.

The regiment was renamed the 111th Transport Aviation Regiment (Serbo-Croatian: 111. vazduhoplovni transportni puk / 111. ваздухопловни транспортни пук) in 1978. In 1982 it had grown to an Aviation Brigade, with two more new helicopter squadrons, the 711th and 713th squadrons coming under command. They were equipped with domestic-made Soko Gazelles.

=== War period ===
The 111th Aviation Brigade was active from the first days of the war in Slovenia. One Mi-8 was shot down by Slovenian Territorial Defence forces on the afternoon of 27 June 1991, killing all three pilots. As the war in Croatia intensified, the brigade found itself located in hostile territory surrounded by Croatian forces, the High Command of the Yugoslav Air Force ordered the evacuation of its units to safer territory, so the 679th Transport Aviation Squadron moved to Batajnica Air Base and was reattached to the 138th Transport Aviation Brigade; while three helicopter squadrons were re-located to Zalužani near Banja Luka. The 713th Anti-Armored Helicopter Squadron was absorbed by the 711th Anti-Armored Helicopter Squadron; so the Air Brigade, consisting of just two squadrons, the 711st and the 780th, became the 111th Helicopter Regiment on 12 October 1991. The regiment operated in an important role during the early war in Croatia and Bosnia and Herzegovina, being used for the transport of troops, ammunition, the evacuation of civilians, CSAR and MEDEVAC missions.

The regiment was withdrawn from the Order of Battle of the Yugoslav People's Army to become part of the newly formed Republika Srpska Air Force on 12 May 1992; it was to be based at Kraljevo-Lađevci Airport. On 26 July 1992, just two months after the initial structure of the Bosnian Serb Air Force was established, the flying units were once again reorganized. The 111th Helicopter Regiment was disbanded, and a new unit designated the 92nd Mixed Aviation Brigade was formed to control both fixed-wing and helicopter squadrons. Later in the same year, the 711th Anti-Armored Helicopter Squadron and the 780th Transport Helicopter Squadrons were merged to create the new unit designated the 89th Mixed Helicopter Squadron.

The commanders of the regiment following its re-establishment were: Stanislav Verbić, Drago Mikulandra, Marko Mrvac, Vukadin Živanović, Milorad Božić, Vilko Voljevac, Joviša Andrić, Alojz Hršak, Stefanović, Andrija Veselinović and Srećko Prentović.

== Assignments ==
- 42nd Aviation Assault Division (1945)
- 2nd Aviation Assault Division (1945–1948)
- 37th Aviation Division (1948–1959)
- 5th Air Command (1959–1961)
  - Disbanded
- 5th Air Command (1961–1964)
- 5th Aviation Corps (1964–1986)
- 5th Corps of Air Force and Air Defense (1986–1991)
- Republika Srpska Air Force (1992)

== Previous designations ==
- 422nd Assault Aviation Regiment (1944-1948)
- 111th Assault Aviation Regiment (1948-1952)
- 111th Fighter-Bomber Aviation Regiment (1952-1961)
  - Disbanded
- 111th Support Aviation Regiment (1961-1978)
- 111th Transport Aviation Regiment (1978-1981)
- 111th Aviation Brigade (1982-1991)
- 111th Helicopter Regiment (1991-1992)

== Organization ==
=== 1961–1978 ===
- 111th Support Aviation Regiment
  - 679th Transport Aviation Squadron
  - 894th Liaison Aviation Squadron (1961-1968)
  - 780th Transport Helicopter Squadron
  - 781st Transport Helicopter Squadron (1973)

=== 1978–1981 ===
- 111th Transport Aviation Regiment
  - 679th Transport Aviation Squadron
  - 780th Transport Helicopter Squadron
  - 781st Transport Helicopter Squadron

=== 1982–1991 ===
- 111th Aviation Brigade
  - 679th Transport Aviation Squadron
  - 780th Transport Helicopter Squadron
  - 781st Transport Helicopter Squadron (1990)
  - 711th Anti-Armored Helicopter Squadron
  - 713th Anti-Armored Helicopter Squadron

=== 1991-1992 ===
- 111th Helicopter Regiment
  - 780th Transport Helicopter Squadron
  - 711th Anti-Armored Helicopter Squadron

== Bases stationed ==
- Novi Sad (1944)
- Klenak (1944)
- Mađarmečke (1945)
- Pleso (1945-1949)
- Cerklje (1949-1961, 1961–1968)
- Pleso (1968-1991)
- Zalužani (1991–1992)

== Commanding officers ==
Date appointed	Name
	Krsta Lakićević
	Hinko Šoić
	Predavec
	Milan Aćimović
	Miloš Milikić
	Radoje Ljubičić
	Matija Macut
	Petar Orešćanin
	Stanislav Verbić
	Drago Mikulandra
	Marko Mrvac
	Vukadin Živanović
	Milorad Božić
	Vilko Voljevac
	Joviša Andrić
	Alojz Hršak
	Stefanović
	Andrija Veselinović
	Srećko Prentović

== Equipment ==
- Ilyushin Il-2 (1944–1952)
- P-47/F-47D Thunderbolt (1954–1961)
- Lisunov Li-2 and 3 (1961-1966)
- Ikarus Kurir (1961-1969)
- Mil Mi-4 (1964-1973)
- Douglas C-47 Skytrain (1966-1976)
- Mil Mi-8 (1974-1992)
- Antonov An-2 (1976-1992)
- Antonov An-26 (1976-1992)
- Soko SA.341 Gazelle/SA.342 Gama (1982-1992)
