= 570th Anti-Submarine Aviation Squadron =

570th Anti-Submarine Aviation Squadron: 570. protivpodmornička avijacijska eskadrila
- Active: 1961 – 1964
- Disbanded: 1964
- Country: Yugoslavia
- Branch: Yugoslav Air Force
- Type: Squadron
- Role: Anti-submarine warfare
- Part of: 97th Support Aviation Regiment
- Garrison/HQ: Mostar

The 570th Anti-Submarine Aviation Squadron (Serbo-Croatian: 570. protivpodmornička avijacijska eskadrila / 570. противподморничка а авијацијска ескадрила) was an aviation squadron of Yugoslav Air Force formed in April, 1961 at Mostar airport.

It was part of 97th Support Aviation Regiment and equipped with domestic-made twin-engine anti-submarine aircraft, Ikarus 214PP. Due to its insufficient performance for the role it was soon withdrawn from Yugoslav Air Force.

Squadron was disbanded in 1964.

== Assignments ==
- 97th Support Aviation Regiment (1961–1964)

== Bases stationed ==
- Mostar (1961–1964)

== Equipment ==
- Ikarus 214PP (1961–1964)
