= 722nd Anti-Armored Helicopter Squadron =

722nd Anti-Armored Helicopter Squadron: 722. protivoklopna helikopterska eskadrila
- Active: February, 1954 – June 28, 1991
- Disbanded: June 28, 1991
- Country: Yugoslavia
- Branch: Yugoslav Air Force
- Type: Squadron
- Role: Helicopter
- Part of: 107th Mixed Aviation Regiment
- Garrison/HQ: Mostar

The 722nd Anti-Armored Helicopter Squadron (Serbo-Croatian: 722. protivoklopna helikopterska eskadrila / 722. противоклопна хеликоптерска ескадрила) was a helicopter squadron of the Yugoslav Air Force formed in February 1954 as 27th Helicopter Squadron (Serbo-Croatian: 27. helikopterska eskadrila/ 27. хеликоптерска ескадрила).

== History ==
The 27th Helicopter Squadron was formed at Pančevo airfield by order from July 16, 1953. It was established with delivery of first British-made US-licensed Westland-Sikorsky WS-51 Mk.1b "Dragonfly" helicopters. The squadron was supposed to be independent, but it was attached to 119th Transport Aviation Regiment. It was the first helicopter unit of the Yugoslav Air Force. On March 31, 1954 Captain Jović has performed flight capabilities of new helicopters in Yugoslav arsenal to Marshal of Yugoslavia Josip Broz Tito.

Two Agusta Bell 47J helicopters have been transferred from JAT Yugoslav Airlines to squadron due to the problems with maintenance.

By the 1961 and application of the "Drvar" reorganization for the Air Force, new type designation system is used to identify squadrons, so the 27th Helicopter Squadron has become 783rd Helicopter Squadron (Serbo-Croatian: 783. helikopterska eskadrila/ 783. хеликоптерска ескадрила). In the same year, the squadron has been dislocated from Pančevo to Zemun airport where it has stayed short, moving next year to new Batajnica Air Base.

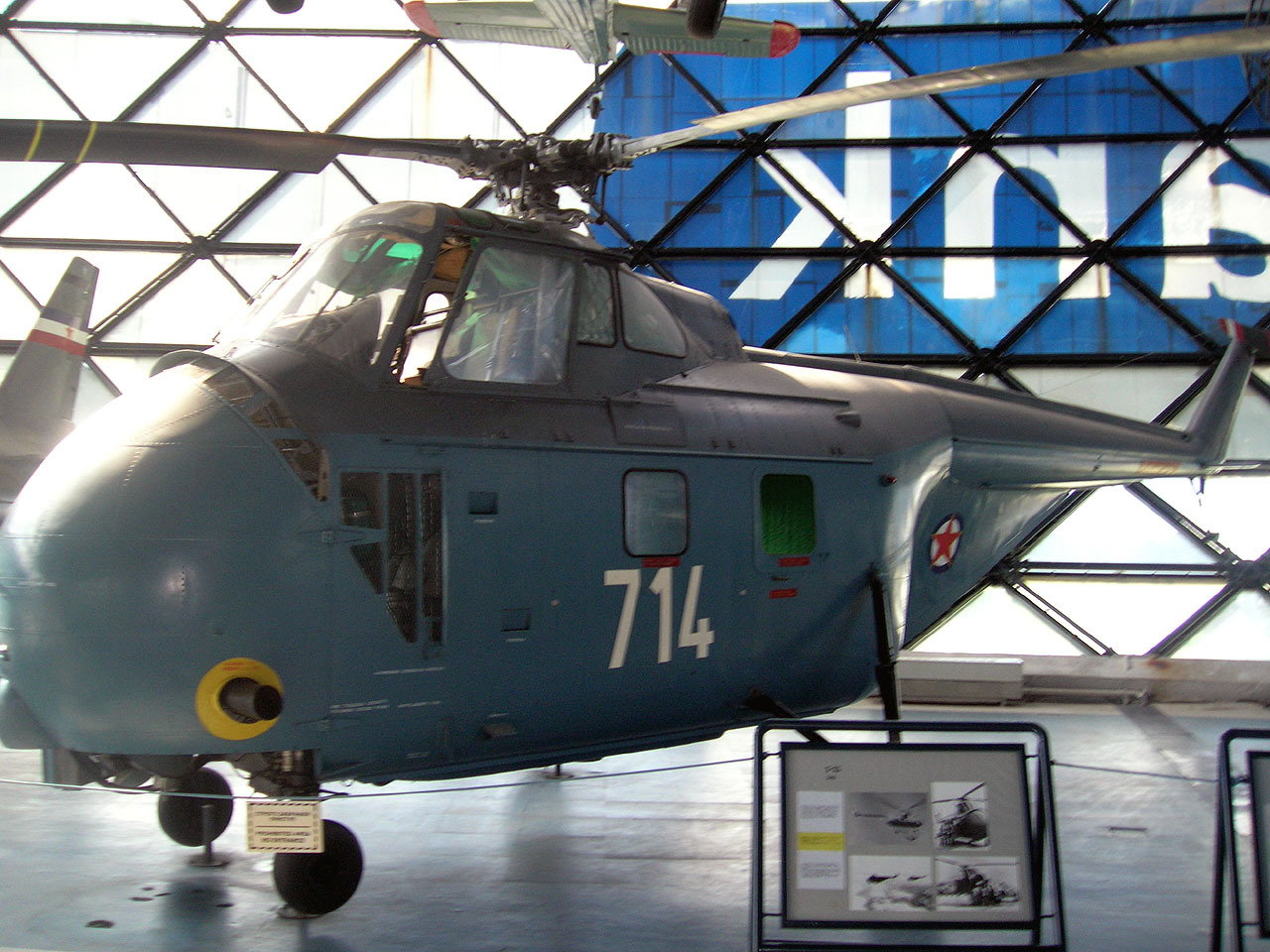
Soko S-55 Mk.V of Yugoslav Air Force which served in 783rd Helicopter Squadron from February 1966 to January 1970, now at Belgrade Aviation Museum.

In 1965 all "Dragonfly" helicopters weer passed to 782nd Helicopter Squadron so in period from 1965 to 1967 it consisted only from one section equipped with Agusta Bell 47J helicopters. By order from February 17, 1966, squadron moves to Niš airport, being reassigned to 107th Support Aviation Regiment. Same year domestic-made licensed Westland SOKO S-55 transport helicopters were introduced with squadron.

The whole 107th Regiment with its squadrons has moved to Mostar airport by order from November 1973. S-55 helicopters were replaced with new domestic-made licensed Soko SA.341 Gazelle light helicopters.

Squadron was again renamed by 1988, after being re-equipped with Gazelle Gama anti-tank helicopters in 1987. It has become 722nd Anti-Armored Helicopter Squadron. It has participated in combat operations during the war in Croatia.

It was disbanded on June 28, 1991. Most of equipment and personal has been passed to 97th Helicopter Regiment.

== Assignments ==
- 119th Transport Aviation Regiment (1954–1966)
- 107th Helicopter Regiment (Support, Mixed) (1966–1991)

== Previous designations ==
- 27th Helicopter Squadron (1954–1961)
- 783rd Helicopter Squadron (1961–1987)
- 722nd Anti-Armored Helicopter Squadron (1987–1991)

== Bases stationed ==
- Pančevo (1954–1961)
- Zemun (1961–1962)
- Batajnica (1962–1966)
- Niš (1966–1973)
- Mostar (1973–1991)

== Equipment ==
- WS-51 Mk.1b "Dragonfly" (1954–1965)
- Agusta Bell 47J (1960–1967)
- Westland (SOKO) S-55 (1966–1973)
- Soko SA.341 Gazelle/SA.342 Gama (1973–1991)
