= Light Combat Aviation Squadron of 5th Air Command =

Light Combat Aviation Squadron of 5th Air Command Vazduhoplovna eskadrila lake borbene avijacije 5. vazduhoplovne komande
- Active: 1953–1961
- Disbanded: 1961
- Country: Yugoslavia
- Branch: Yugoslav Air Force
- Type: Squadron
- Role: Training
- Part of: 5th Air Command
- Garrison/HQ: Pleso

The Light Combat Aviation Squadron of 5th Air Command (Serbo-Croatian: Vazduhoplovna eskadrila lake borbene avijacije 5. vazduhoplovne komande / Ваздухопловна ескадрила лаке борбене авијације 5. ваздухопловне команде) was an aviation squadron of Yugoslav Air Force formed in 1953 at Pleso airfield as the Training Squadron of 32nd Aviation Division (Serbo-Croatian: Trenažna eskadrila 32. vazduhoplovne divizije / Тренажна ескадрила 32. ваздухопловне дивизије).

The squadron was part of 32nd Aviation Division. It was equipped with Soviet-made Yakovlev Yak-9U fighter trainers and British de Havilland Mosquito fighters.

In 1959, under the Drvar reorganization plan of the Yugoslav Air Force, the training squadron became the Light Combat Aviation Squadron of 5th Air Command. It was disbanded in April 1961.

== Assignments ==
- 32nd Aviation Division (1953–1959)
- 5th Air Command (1959–1961)

== Previous designations ==
- Training Squadron of 32nd Aviation Division (1953–1959)
- Light Combat Aviation Squadron of 5th Air Command (1959–1961)

== Equipment ==
- de Havilland Mosquito Mk 6 (1953–1961)
- Yakovlev Yak-9U (1953–1959)
