= 676th Transport Aviation Squadron =

676th Transport Aviation Squadron: 676. transportna avijacijska eskadrila
- Active: 1961 – 1966
- Disbanded: 1966
- Country: Yugoslavia
- Branch: Yugoslav Air Force
- Type: Squadron
- Role: Transport
- Part of: 119th Support Aviation Regiment
- Garrison/HQ: Batajnica

The 676th Transport Aviation Squadron (Serbo-Croatian: 676. transportna avijacijska eskadrila / 676. транспортна авијацијска ескадрила) was an aviation squadron of Yugoslav Air Force established in April, 1961 as part of 119th Support Aviation Regiment at Zemun military airport.

It was formed from squadron equipped with US-made Douglas C-47 Skytrain cargo aircraft.

In 1963 the squadron was dislocated from old Zemun airport to new Batajnica Air Base as well as the whole 119th Regiment.

The squadron has been disbanded in 1966 same as its 119th Support Aviation Regiment.

== Assignments ==
- 119th Support Aviation Regiment (1961–1966)

== Bases stationed ==
- Zemun (1961–1963)
- Batajnica Air Base (1963–1966)

== Equipment ==
- Douglas C-47 Skytrain (1961–1966)
