= 121st Fighter Aviation Squadron =

121st Fighter Aviation Squadron: 121. lovačka avijacijska eskadrila
- Active: 1961 – 1964
- Disbanded: 1964
- Country: Yugoslavia
- Branch: Yugoslav Air Force
- Type: Squadron
- Role: Fighter
- Part of: 83rd Fighter Aviation Regiment
- Garrison/HQ: Golubovci

The 121st Fighter Aviation Squadron (Serbo-Croatian: 121. lovačka avijacijska eskadrila / 121. ловачка авијацијска ескадрила) was an aviation squadron of Yugoslav Air Force established in April, 1961 as part of 83rd Fighter Aviation Regiment at Zemunik military airport.

It was equipped with US-made North American F-86E Sabre jet fighter aircraft.

In 1963 the 83rd Fighter Aviation Regiment with its both squadrons (120th and 121st Fighter Aviation Squadron) has been dislocated from Zemunik to Titograd military airport.

By the end of year 1964 the 83rd Fighter Aviation Regiment has been disbanded. The 121st Fighter Aviation Squadron was also disbanded. Its personnel and equipment were attached to 120th Fighter Aviation Squadron.

== Assignments ==
- 83rd Fighter Aviation Regiment (1961-1964)

== Bases stationed ==
- Zemunik (1961–1963)
- Golubovci (1963–1964)

== Equipment ==
- North American F-86E Sabre (1961–1964)
