= 247th Fighter-Bomber Aviation Squadron =

247th Fighter-Bomber Aviation Squadron: 247. lovačko-bombarderska avijacijska eskadrila
- Active: 1975–1992
- Disbanded: 1992
- Country: Yugoslavia
- Branch: Yugoslav Air Force
- Type: Squadron
- Role: Fighter-Bomber
- Part of: 98th Aviation Brigade
- Garrison/HQ: Skopski Petrovac

The 247th Fighter-Bomber Aviation Squadron (Serbo-Croatian: 247. lovačko-bombarderska avijacijska eskadrila / 247. ловачко-бомбардерска авијацијска ескадрила) was an aviation squadron of Yugoslav Air Force established in January, 1975 by order from January 28, 1974.

The squadron was formed as part of 98th Aviation Brigade based at Skopski Petrovac military airfield.

It was equipped with domestic-made Soko J-21 Jastreb light-attack jet aircraft.

In February 1992 the squadron was relocated from old Skopski Petrovac airport in Republic of Macedonia to Lađevci airport in Serbia along with the whole 98th Aviation Brigade due to the Republic of Macedonia declaring independence. All units of Yugoslav People's Army were withdrawn from the new Republic to Serbia. The Squadron was disbanded on September 7, 1992.

== Assignments ==
- 98th Aviation Brigade (1975–1992)

== Bases stationed ==
- Skopski Petrovac (1975–1992)
- Lađevci (1992)

== Equipment ==
- Soko J-21 Jastreb (1975–1992)
