= 893rd Helicopter Reconnaissance and Liaison Squadron =

893rd Helicopter Reconnaissance and Liaison Squadron: 893. helikopterska eskadrila za izviđanje i vezu
- Active: 1959 – 1965; 1980 - 1988
- Disbanded: 1965; 1988
- Country: Yugoslavia
- Branch: Yugoslav Air Force
- Type: Squadron
- Role: Liaison
- Part of: 2nd Army

The 893rd Helicopter Reconnaissance and Liaison Squadron (Serbo-Croatian: 893. helikopterska eskadrila za izviđanje i vezu / 893. хеликоптерска ескадрила за извиђање и везу) was an aviation squadron of Yugoslav Air Force formed in 1959 at Mostar airfield as Liaison Squadron of 9th Air Command (Serbo-Croatian: Eskadrila za vezu 9. vazduhoplovne komande / Ескадрила за везу 9. ваздухопловне команде).

By the April 1961 and application of the "Drvar" reorganization for the Air Force, new type designation system is used to identify squadrons, so the Liaison Squadron of 9th Air Command has become 893rd Liaison Aviation Squadron. It was disbanded after 1959, estimated 1961.

It was equipped with domestic liaison Ikarus Kurir aircraft. With 9th Air Command being disbanded in 1964 squadron was reattached to 97th Support Aviation Regiment. Squadron was disbanded in 1965, but its numeration has remained in reserve.

By order from January 9, 1980, the 893rd Helicopter Flight (Serbo-Croatian: 893. helikoptersko odeljenje / 893. хеликоптерско одељење) has been established at Niš airfield with 2nd Army of Yugoslav People's Army for reconnaissance and liaison duties equipped with domestic made Soko SA,341 Gazelle helicopters. By order from March 1, 1985, it is designated as 893rd Helicopter Reconnaissance and Liaison Squadron. Due to the 1988 reorganization of field armies of Yugoslav People's Army, 893rd Squadron has been attached to 891st Helicopter Reconnaissance and Liaison Squadron as its helicopter flight.

== Assignments ==
- 9th Air Command (1959–1964)
- 97th Support Aviation Regiment (1964-1965)
- 2nd Army (1980-1988)

== Previous designations ==
- Liaison Squadron of 9th Air Command (1959–1961)
- 893rd Liaison Aviation Squadron (1961-1965)
- 893rd Helicopter Flight (1980-1985)
- 893rd Helicopter Reconnaissance and Liaison Squadron (1985-1988)

== Bases stationed ==
- Mostar (1959–1965)
- Niš (1980–1988)

== Equipment ==
- Ikarus Kurir (1959-1965)
- Soko SA.341 Gazelle Hera (1980–1988)
