= 781st Transport Helicopter Squadron (Yugoslavian Air Force) =

781st Transport Helicopter Squadron: 781. transportna helikopterska eskadrila
- Active: October, 1960 – 1990
- Disbanded: 1990
- Country: Yugoslavia
- Branch: Yugoslav Air Force
- Type: Squadron
- Role: Helicopter
- Part of: 111th Aviation Brigade
- Garrison/HQ: Pleso

The 781st Transport Helicopter Squadron (Serbo-Croatian: 781. transportna helikopterska eskadrila / 781. транспортна хеликоптерска ескадрила) was a helicopter squadron of Yugoslav Air Force formed in October 1960 as 48th Helicopter Squadron (Serbo-Croatian: 48. helikopterska eskadrila / 48. хеликоптерска ескадрила).

== History ==
The 48th Helicopter Squadron was formed at Niš airport in October 1960 as part of 107th Helicopter Regiment. It was equipped with Soviet-made Mil Mi-4 transport helicopters.

By the April 1961 and application of the "Drvar" reorganization for the Air Force, new type designation system is used to identify squadrons, so the 48th Helicopter Squadron has become 781st Transport Helicopter Squadron.

Squadron has been moved to Pleso airport near Zagreb by order from January 1973, being reassigned to 111th Support Aviation Regiment. Same year Mil Mi-4 helicopters were replaced with newer Soviet Mil Mi-8T transport helicopters.

In 1990 due to the "Jedinstvo 3" reorganization plan, 781st Squadron was disbanded. Personnel and equipment were attached to 780th Transport Helicopter Squadron of same 111th Aviation Brigade.

== Assignments ==
- 107th Helicopter Regiment (Support, Mixed) (1960–1973)
- 111th Support Aviation Regiment (Transport, Aviation Brigade) (1973–1990)

== Previous designations ==
- 48th Helicopter Squadron (1960-1961)
- 781st Transport Helicopter Squadron (1961–1990)

== Bases stationed ==
- Niš (1960–1973)
- Pleso (1973–1990)

== Equipment ==
- Mil Mi-4 (1960–1973)
- Mil Mi-8T (1973–1990)
