= 897th Helicopter Reconnaissance and Liaison Squadron =

897th Helicopter Reconnaissance and Liaison Squadron: 897. helikopterska eskadrila za izviđanje i vezu
- Active: 1981 - 1988
- Disbanded: 1988
- Country: Yugoslavia
- Branch: Yugoslav Air Force
- Type: Squadron
- Role: Liaison
- Part of: 9th Army
- Garrison/HQ: Brnik Airport

The 897th Helicopter Reconnaissance and Liaison Squadron (Serbo-Croatian: 897. helikopterska eskadrila za izviđanje i vezu / 897. хеликоптерска ескадрила за извиђање и везу) was an aviation squadron of Yugoslav Air Force formed in 1981 at Brnik airport 897th Helicopter Flight (Serbo-Croatian: 897. helikoptersko odeljenje / 897. хеликоптерско одељење).

The helicopter flight was formed by order from August 18, 1981, for with 9th Army of Yugoslav People's Army for reconnaissance and liaison duties equipped with domestic made Soko SA,341 Gazelle helicopters. By order from March 1, 1985, it is designated as 897th Helicopter Reconnaissance and Liaison Squadron. Due to the 1988 reorganization of field armies of Yugoslav People's Army, 897th Squadron has been attached to 894th Liaison Aviation Squadron as its helicopter flight.

== Assignments ==
- 9th Army (1981–1988)

== Previous designations ==
- 897th Helicopter Flight (1981-1985)
- 897th Helicopter Reconnaissance and Liaison Squadron (1985-1988)

== Equipment ==
- Soko SA.341 Gazelle Hera (1981–1988)
