= Light Combat Aviation Squadron of 9th Air Command =

Light Combat Aviation Squadron of 9th Air Command Vazduhoplovna eskadrila lake borbene avijacije 9. vazduhoplovne komande
- Active: 1953 – 1954; 1957-1961
- Disbanded: 1954; 1961
- Country: Yugoslavia
- Branch: Yugoslav Air Force
- Type: Squadron
- Role: Training
- Part of: 9th Air Command
- Garrison/HQ: Zemunik

The Light Combat Aviation Squadron of 9th Air Command (Serbo-Croatian: Vazduhoplovna eskadrila lake borbene avijacije 9. vazduhoplovne komande / Ваздухопловна ескадрила лаке борбене авијације 9. ваздухопловне команде) was an aviation squadron of Yugoslav Air Force formed in 1953 at Zemunik airfield as Training Squadron of 21st Aviation Division (Serbo-Croatian: Trenažna eskadrila 21. vazduhoplovne divizije / Тренажна ескадрила 21. ваздухопловне дивизије).

Squadron was part of 21st Aviation Division. It was equipped with US-made F-47D Thunderbolt fighter-bombers. It was disbanded in 1954 but again re-established in 1957 being reequipped with US-made T-33A Shooting Star jet trainer aircraft.

In 1959 due to the Drvar reorganization this squadron became the Light Combat Aviation Squadron of 9th Air Command.

Squadron was disbanded in April 1961.

== Assignments ==
- 21st Aviation Division (1953–1954, 1957–1959)
- 9th Air Command (1959–1961)

== Previous designations ==
- Training Squadron of 21st Aviation Division (1953–1954, 1957–1959)
- Light Combat Aviation Squadron of 9th Air Command (1959–1961)

== Equipment ==
- F-47D Thunderbolt (1953–1959)
- T-33A Shooting Star (1957–1961)
