= 789th Transport Helicopter Squadron =

789th Transport Helicopter Squadron: 789. transportna helikopterska eskadrila
- Active: October, 1968 – 1990
- Disbanded: 1990
- Country: Yugoslavia
- Branch: Yugoslav Air Force
- Type: Squadron
- Role: Helicopter
- Part of: 119th Aviation Brigade
- Garrison/HQ: Niš

The 789th Transport Helicopter Squadron (Serbo-Croatian: 789. transportna helikopterska eskadrila / 789. транспортна хеликоптерска ескадрила) was a helicopter squadron of Yugoslav Air Force formed in October 1968 at Niš airport.

== History ==
The 48th Helicopter Squadron was formed at Niš airport in May 1968 as part of 119th Transport Helicopter Regiment. It was equipped with Soviet-made Mil Mi-8T transport helicopters.

In 1990 due to the "Jedinstvo 3" reorganization plan, 789th Squadron was disbanded. Personnel and equipment were attached to 787th Transport Helicopter Squadron of same 119th Aviation Brigade.

== Assignments ==
- 119th Transport Helicopter Regiment (Support, Aviation Brigade, 1968–1990)

== Bases stationed ==
- Niš (1968–1990)

== Equipment ==
- Mil Mi-8T (1968–1990)
