= Divulje =

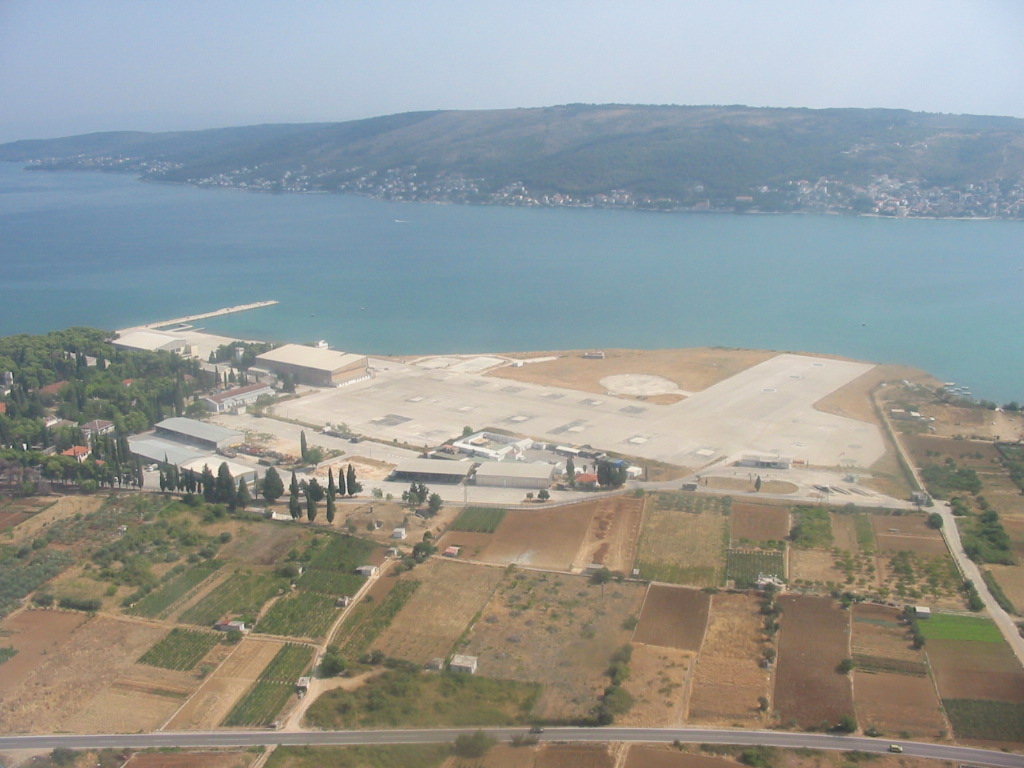
- Divulje Airbase in 2007
- Interactive map of Divulje
- Location within Croatia
- Coordinates: 43°31′37.2″N 16°17′42″E
- Country: Croatia
- County: Split-Dalmatia
- City: Trogir

Area
  - Total: 1.4 km^{2} (0.54 sq mi)

Population (2021)
  - Total: 52
  - Density: 37/km^{2} (96/sq mi)
- Time zone: UTC+1 (CET)
  - Summer (DST): UTC+2 (CEST)
- Postal code: 21220 Trogir

Divulje is a settlement in the city of Trogir in Split-Dalmatia County, Croatia. It is located on the coast of Kaštela Bay.

It is best known for the Divulje airfield, which served as the Split–Divulje Airbase between 1993 and 2008.

== Demographics ==
In the 2021 census, the settlement had a population of 52.

Divulje: Population trends 1857–2021
v

population									36	552	361	36	58	32	37	26	52
	1857	1869	1880	1890	1900	1910	1921	1931	1948	1953	1961	1971	1981	1991	2001	2011	2021

Sources:Croatian Bureau of Statistics publications
