= Banja Luka Zalužani Airfield =

Recreational airfield in northern Banja Luka

Coordinates: 44.8486°N 17.2209°E

Banja Luka Zalužani Airfield (Serbian: Аеродром Бања Лука — Залужани, romanized: Aerodrom Banja Luka - Zalužani) is a recreational airfield on the northern outskirts of the city of Banja Luka, the second largest city in Bosnia and Herzegovina.

== Accidents and incidents ==
- On 20 May 2012, five people were killed when a sports plane, a Cessna 182 owned by Parachute Club Banja Luka, burst into flames and crashed in a field at Zalužani Airport. There were no survivors, and the victims were identified as a pilot, a parachuting instructor and three people who were undergoing parachuting training. The cause is unknown.

== See also ==
- Banja Luka International Airport
