= Kraljevo Airport =

Kraljevo Airport may refer to any of these airports serving Kraljevo, Serbia:

- Morava/Lađevci Airport
- Brege Airport
