= 98th Air Brigade =

- 98. ваздухопловна бригада
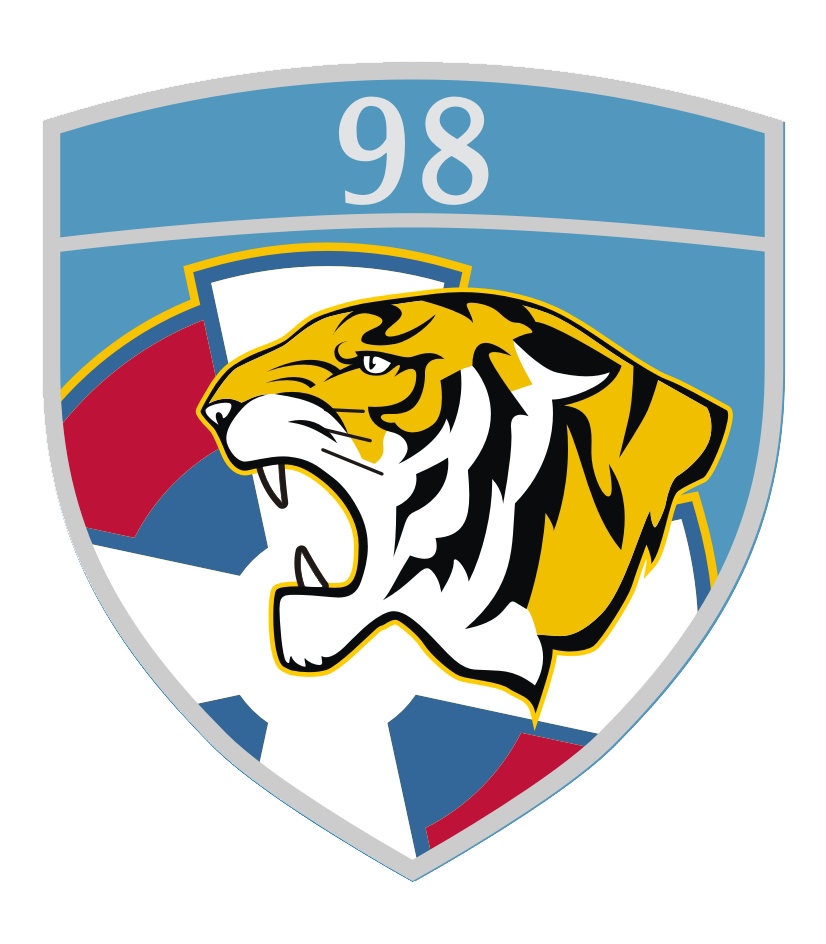
- Active: 2007 – present
- Country: Serbia
- Branch: Serbian Air Force and Air Defence
- Type: Air brigade
- Role: Aerial support Fire support Air reconnaissance Air transport
- Garrison/HQ: Lađevci Air Base; Niš Air Base
- Anniversaries: 28 November

Commanders
- Current commander: Brigade General Aleksandar Milićević

The 98th Air Brigade (Serbian: 98. ваздухопловна бригада, romanized: 98. vazduhoplovna brigada) is a mixed (attack aviation and attack helicopters) brigade of the Serbian Air Force and Air Defence.

== History ==
The 98th Air Brigade was formed on 13 June 2007 as a successor of the 98th Fighter-Bomber Regiment of the Yugoslav and Serbia-Montenegro air forces. It is created from the former 161st Air Base (Niš Air Base), 265th Air Base (Lađevci Air Base) and their ground support units, 98th Fighter-Bomber Regiment, 119th Helicopter Regiment, a part of 677th Transport Squadron and part of 353rd Reconnaissance Squadron. Parts of the 677th Transport Squadron, 712th Anti-armor Helicopter Squadron and 787th Helicopter Squadron are now 119th Mixed Helicopter Squadron, while the 241st Fighter-bomber Squadron and 714th Anti-armor Helicopter Squadron remained active.

== Missions ==
In peace time, brigade performs the following tasks:

- deterring aggressions by deploying Air Force and prevention of surprise attacks
- aerial reconnaissance
- air transport
- participation in peacekeeping operations and in international military cooperation
- providing support to civil authorities in case of natural disasters, industrial and other accidents and epidemics

In war time, brigade performs the following tasks:

- aerial firing support
- air defense of the air base
- aerial reconnaissance
- aerial transport

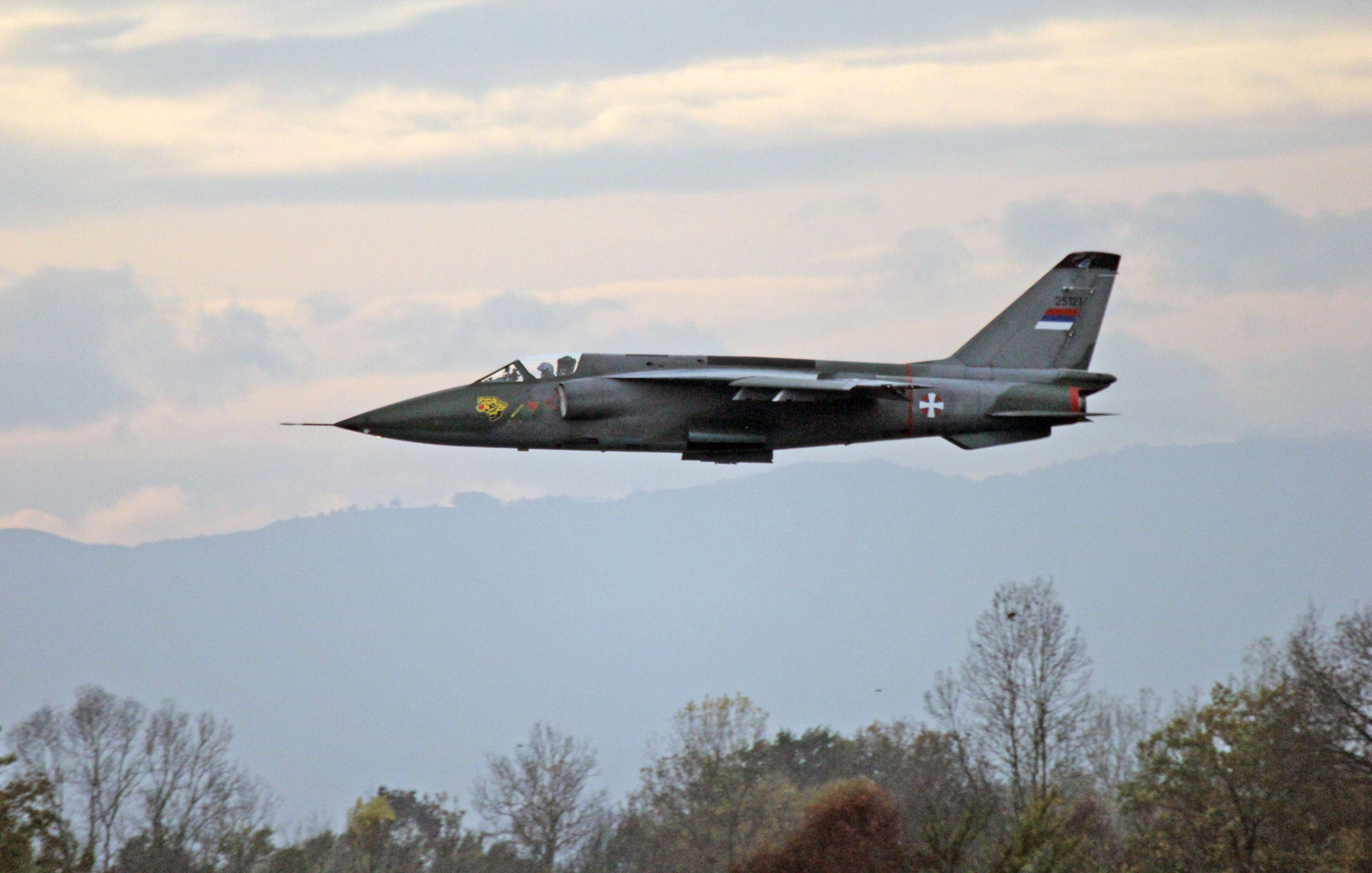
J-22 of the 241st Fighter-Bomber Squadron "Tigers"

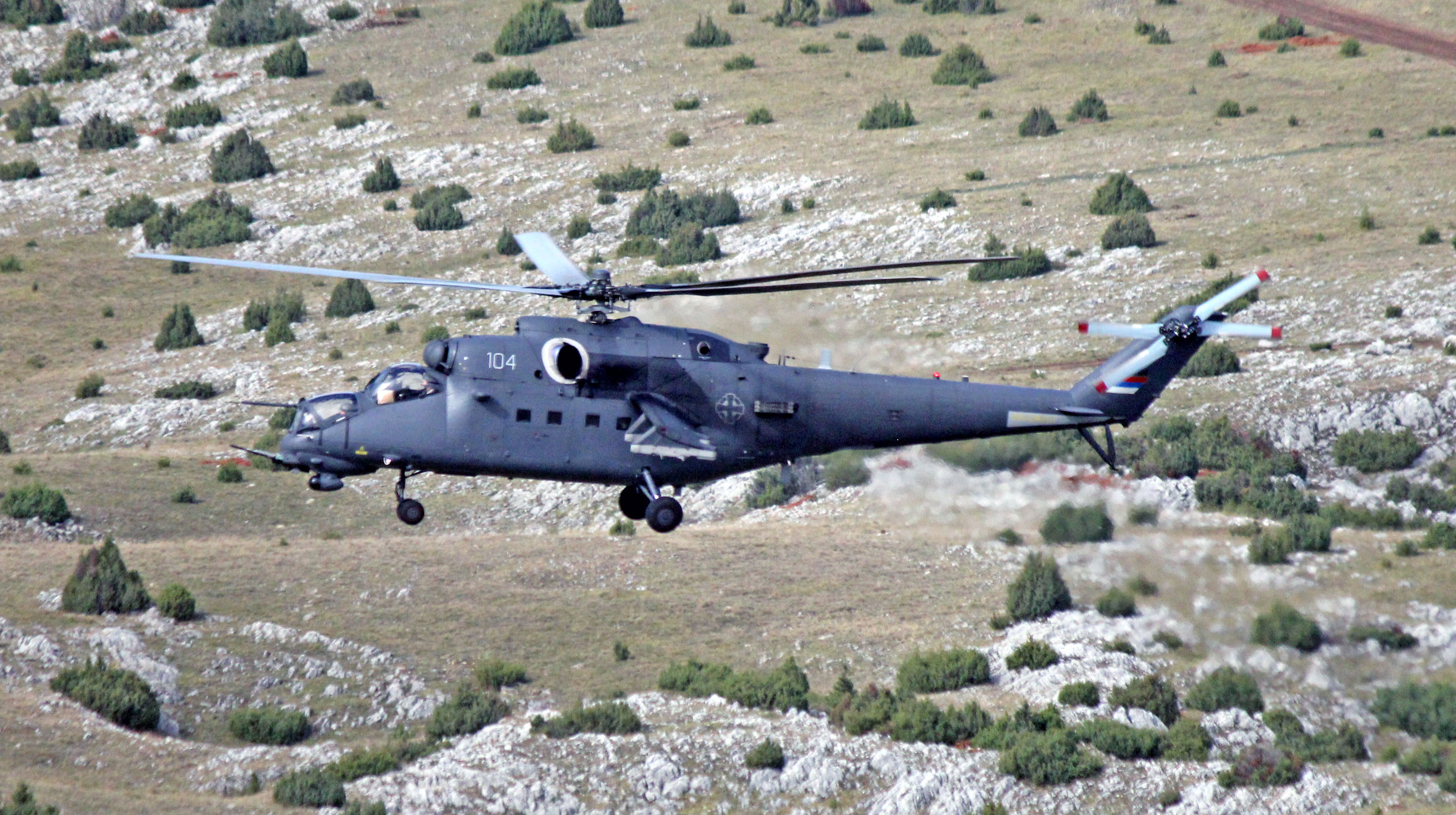
Mi-35M of the 714th Anti-armor Helicopter Squadron "Shadows"

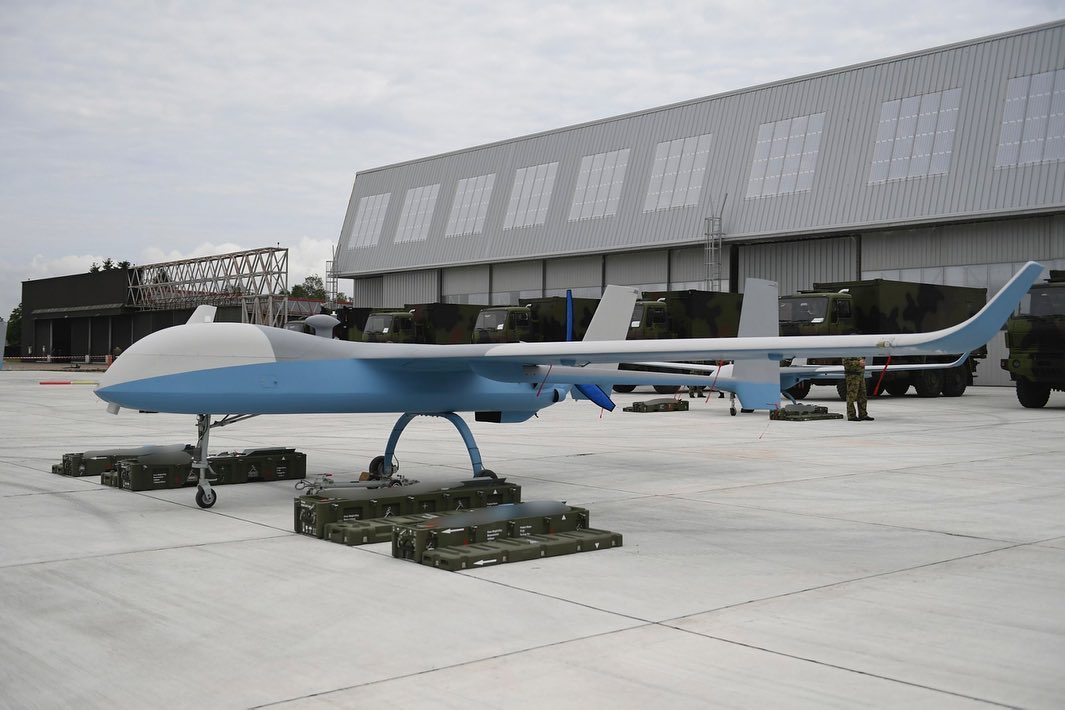
CH-95 of the 353rd Reconnaissance Squadron "Shadows"

== Structure ==
The 98th Air Brigade is a joint tactical air force unit whose basic organization structure consists of modular units of squadron and battalion size. Most of its units are located at Lađevci Air Base, while few (119th Mixed Helicopter Squadron and 161st Air Base Security Battalion) are located at Niš Air Base.

- 241st Fighter-Bomber Squadron "Tigers" (equipped with J-22)
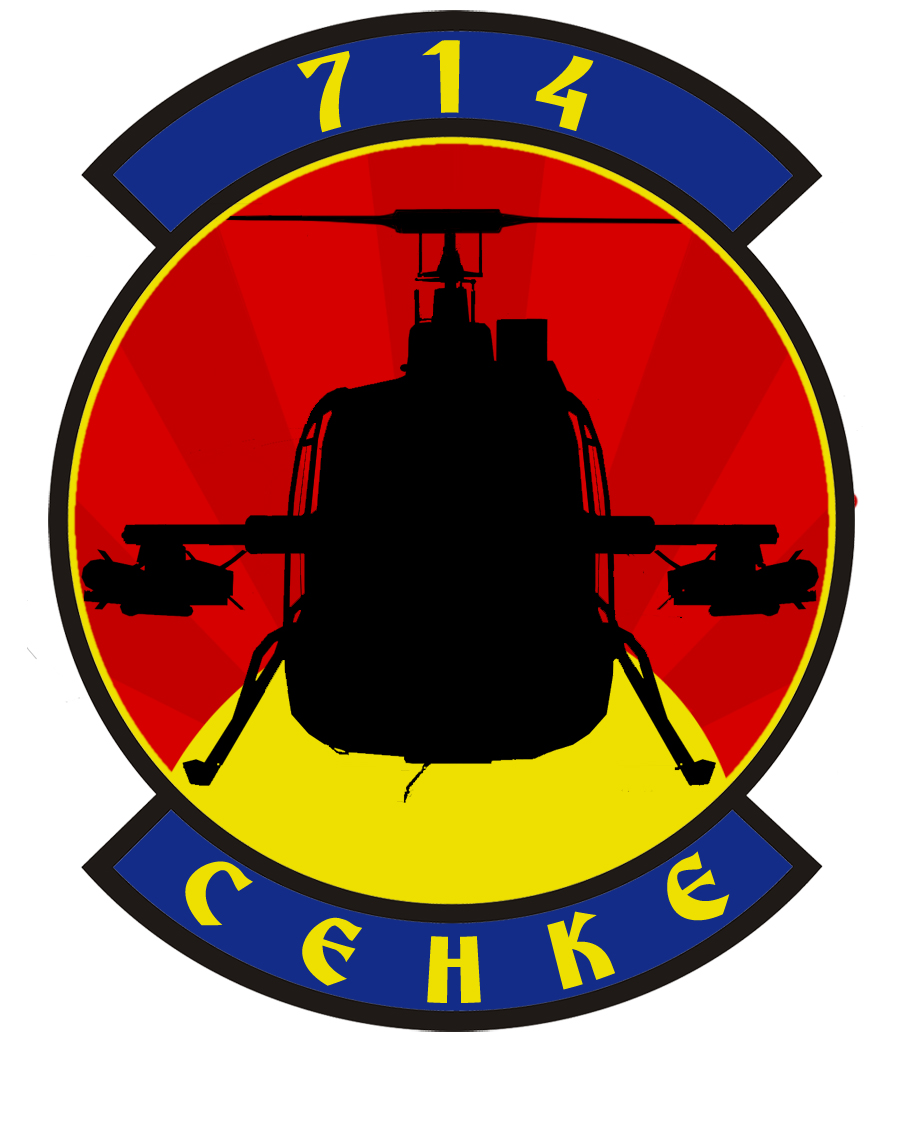
- 714th Anti-armor Helicopter Squadron "Shadows" (equipped with Mi-35 and SA341H)
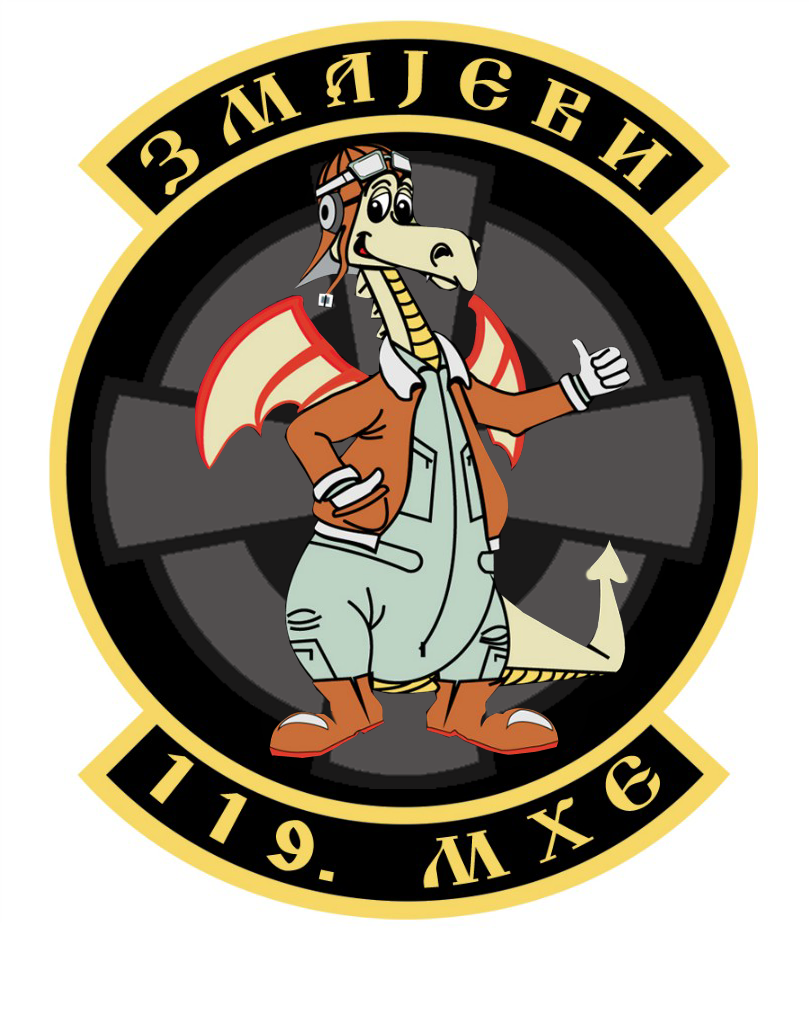
- 119th Mixed Helicopter Squadron "Dragons" (equipped with H145M and SA341H)
- 353rd Reconnaissance Squadron "Hawks" (equipped with Hermes 900, CH-95, CH-92, Pegaz)
- 98th Air Defence Artillery Missile Battalion
- 98th Air Technical Battalion
- 98th Air Base Security Battalion
- 161st Air Base Security Battalion

== Traditions ==
=== Anniversary ===
The anniversary of the unit is celebrated on November 28. On that day in 1949, the 98th Fighter-Bomber Aviation Regiment was formed which has the longest tradition of all the units that became part of today's brigade.

=== Patron saint ===
The unit's slava or its patron saint is Saint Elijah known as Ilindan.
