= 126th Air Surveillance, Early Warning and Guidance Brigade =

- 126. бригада ваздушног осматрања, јављања и навођења
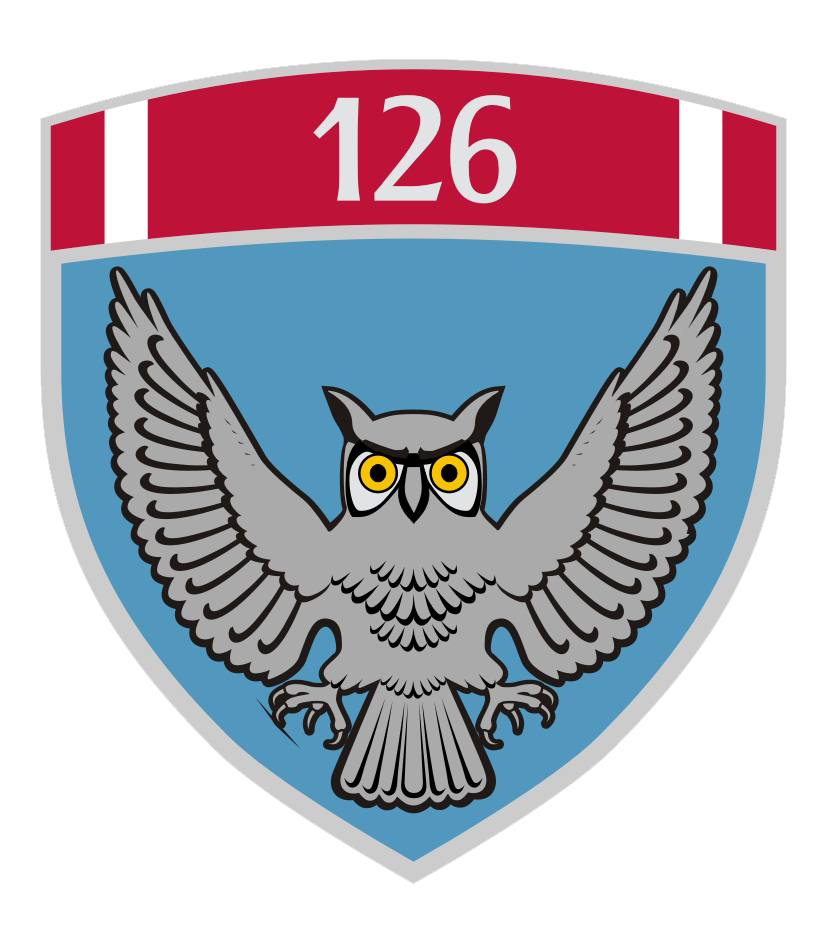
- Active: 1992 – present
- Country: Serbia
- Branch: Serbian Air Force and Air Defence
- Type: Air brigade
- Role: Air surveillance
- Garrison/HQ: Belgrade
- Anniversaries: 18 June
- Engagements: 1999 NATO bombing of Yugoslavia

Commanders
- Current commander: Brigade General Jovica Kepčija

The 126th Air Surveillance, Early Warning and Guidance Brigade (Serbian: 126. бригада ваздушног осматрања, јављања и навођења, romanized: 126. brigada vazdušnog osmatranja, javljanja i navođenja; abbr. VOJIN) is a joint tactical unit of Serbian Air Force and Air Defence, tasked with surveillance of the Serbian airspace and providing information on the current situation in airspace to all command levels in the Serbian Armed Forces.

== History ==
The brigade was formed after the break-up of Yugoslavia, on 12 October 1992, out of the three previous regiments. During the 1999 NATO bombing, the unit successfully conducted its tasks and was awarded the Order of the National Hero for its outstanding courage and achieved results.

== Missions ==
The 126th ASEWG Brigade conducts the following tasks:

- continuous surveillance of airspace
- detection, monitoring and identification of targets in airspace
- collection, processing, presenting, and distributing data about the situation in air space to all command levels
- radar security and guidance of fighter aircraft
- direction of air defence artillery-missile units to targets in airspace
- navigation support to aircraft in need
- selection and arrangement of basic, reserve, false and follow-on radar positions
- maintenance of radar systems

== Structure ==
The brigade consists of two ASWEG battalions, one support battalion and a command company:

- Command Company
- 20th ASWEG Battalion (Batajnica Air Base)
- 31st ASWEG Battalion (Lađevci Air Base)
- Battalion for Aero Technical Maintenance and Supply (Batajnica Air Base)

== Equipment ==
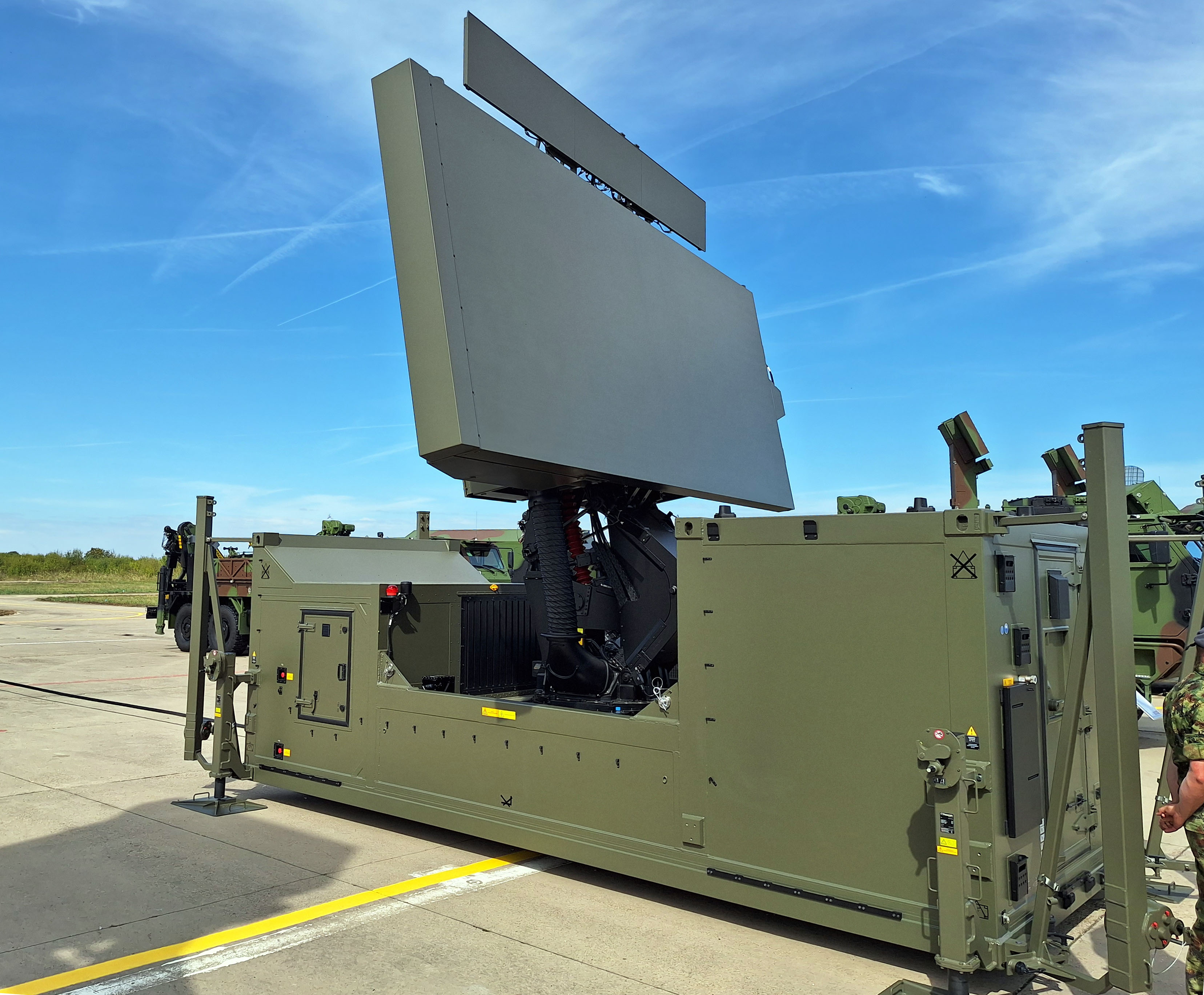
Ground Master 400α long-range radar system

The main equipment of a brigade consists of the following radar-computing resources and systems:

- Ground Master 400α long-range radar three-dimensional surveillance radar
- Ground Master 200 medium-range radar three-dimensional surveillance radar
- GS-60 short-range radar three-dimensional surveillance radar

== Traditions ==
=== Anniversary ===
The anniversary of the unit is celebrated on June 18, in memory of the day in 1915 when the Serbian Supreme Command issued an order to form steady surveillance signal stations, in order to mark the direction of enemy airplanes flights.

=== Decorations ===
Order of the National Hero (2000)
