= 353rd Reconnaissance Squadron =

- 353. извиђачка ескадрила
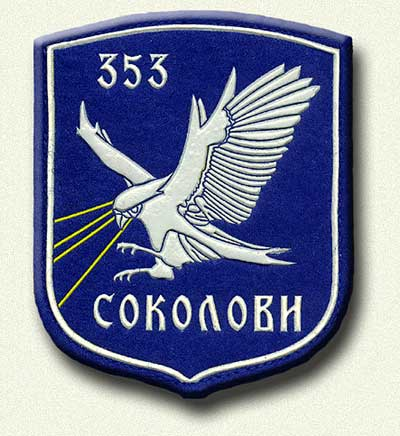
- Active: 1961 – 2006; 2020 – present
- Country: Serbia
- Branch: Serbian Air Force and Air Defence
- Type: Reconnaissance squadron
- Role: Aerial reconnaissance
- Part of: 98th Air Brigade
- Garrison/HQ: Lađevci Airbase
- Nicknames: Falcons (Sokolovi)
- Anniversaries: 12 February
- Engagements: Yugoslav Wars

Commanders
- Current commander: Lieutenant Colonel Srđan Ilić

353rd Reconnaissance Squadron (Serbian: 353. извиђачка ескадрила "Соколови", romanized: 353. izviđačka eskadrila "Sokolovi") is a squadron of the 98th Air Brigade of the Serbian Air Force and based at Lađevci Airbase.

== History ==
The 353rd squadron was created in 1961 with RF-84G Thunderjet fighter-bombers of American origin that were converted into tactical scouts. At that time they were at the Pleso Air Base in Zagreb. From 1964, it used modified American IF-86D Saber fighter-interceptors.

The squadron was disbanded in 1966, but a new unit of the same name was formed in Mostar with RF-84G intended primarily for reconnaissance on the Adriatic naval bases. In 1973, American aircraft were withdrawn from service and domestic aircraft IJ-21 Jastreb were introduced. The first J-22s that left the "Soko" factory in Mostar in 1981 were deployed in the 353rd squadron.

=== Yugoslav Wars ===
During the War in Croatia, the pilots of the squadron flew with J-22s and J-21s from home Ortiješ Air Base as well as Batajnica Air Base and Tuzla Air Base for the purposes of reconnaissance in Slavonia. The armed conflict of the spring of 1992 engulfed Herzegovina and therefore the squadron's home air base: one J-22 was hit by a Strela-2M rocket, but managed to land; on the stand, another plane was badly damaged and it was clear that the aviation had to go east. In May 1992, the squadron was transferred to Lađevci Air Base. After the Dayton Peace Agreement, a sub-regional arms control mechanism was agreed upon and the number of combat aircraft (counting scouts) was reduced to 155 pieces. The J-21s went to the museum, and the 10 IJ-22 Eagles continued to fly, but due to the reduction in the number of aircraft at the Batajnica Air Base, the 352nd Reconnaissance Squadron, which used 2 MiG-21Rs and 4 MiG-21Ms, was disbanded. They became a part of the 353rd squadron.

Scouts have been filming the situation in Kosovo since the first clashes with Albanian rebels in 1998. Foreign TV camera footage recorded the flights of J-22 pilots over northern Albania, where terrorist training centers were located.

=== Dissolution ===
Aircraft resources have run out and during the last decade all reconnaissance J-22s and MiG-21s have been grounded. During the re-establishment of the Serbian Armed Forces in 2006 and 2007, following the restoration of country's independence, two departments were formed out of the 353rd squadron - one with MiGs at Batajnica Air Base and other with J-22s at Lađevci Air Base, but as units on paper because they were left without equipment. The last attempt to save reconnaissance aviation was the integration of aerial photo cameras from the J-22s on two MiG-21bis, but they had to return to fighter missions due to the lack of dedicated aircraft. The departments were disbanded in 2010, and since then the Serbian Air Force has had no potential for aerial reconnaissance.

=== Re-establishment ===
The 353rd Reconnaissance Squadron was formed again in 2020 following the delivery of Chinese made CH-92 UAVs. The CH-92 drones can be used for reconnaissance missions along with ground support missions but also for precise determination of the coordinates of observed targets on the ground, their automatic tracking, for intelligence preparation of the battlefield, correction of artillery fire, assessment of effects, laser marking of the target for the effect of other laser-guided munitions (bombs and rockets). Serbian made Pegaz UAVs are also expected to enter service in 353rd Squadron by the end of 2022. Pegaz is a product of Serbian and Chinese technical cooperation.

== Bases ==
- Pleso Air Base (1961–1964)
- Ortiješ Air Base (1964–1992)
- Lađevci Air Base (1992–2006, 2020–present)

== Equipment ==
=== Current ===
- Hermes 900 (2025–present)
- CH-95 (2023–present)
- CH-92 (2020–present)
- Pegaz (2025–present)

=== Retired ===
- MiG-21 (1995–2006)
- J-22 Orao (1982–2003)
- J-21 Jastreb (1973–1995)
- RF-84G Thunderjet (1961–1973)
- F-86D Sabre (1964–1973)

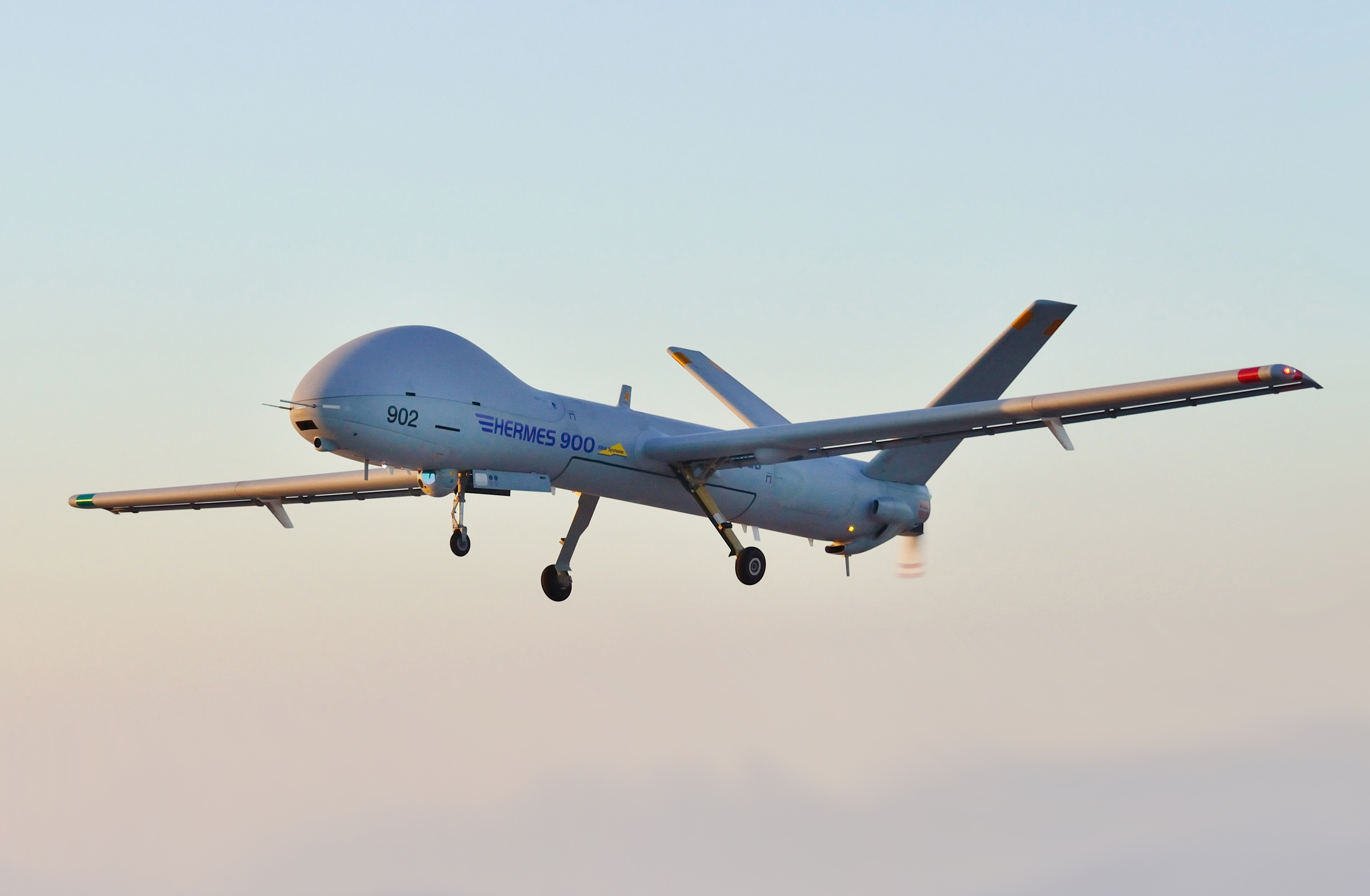
Hermes 900 combat and reconnaissance drone

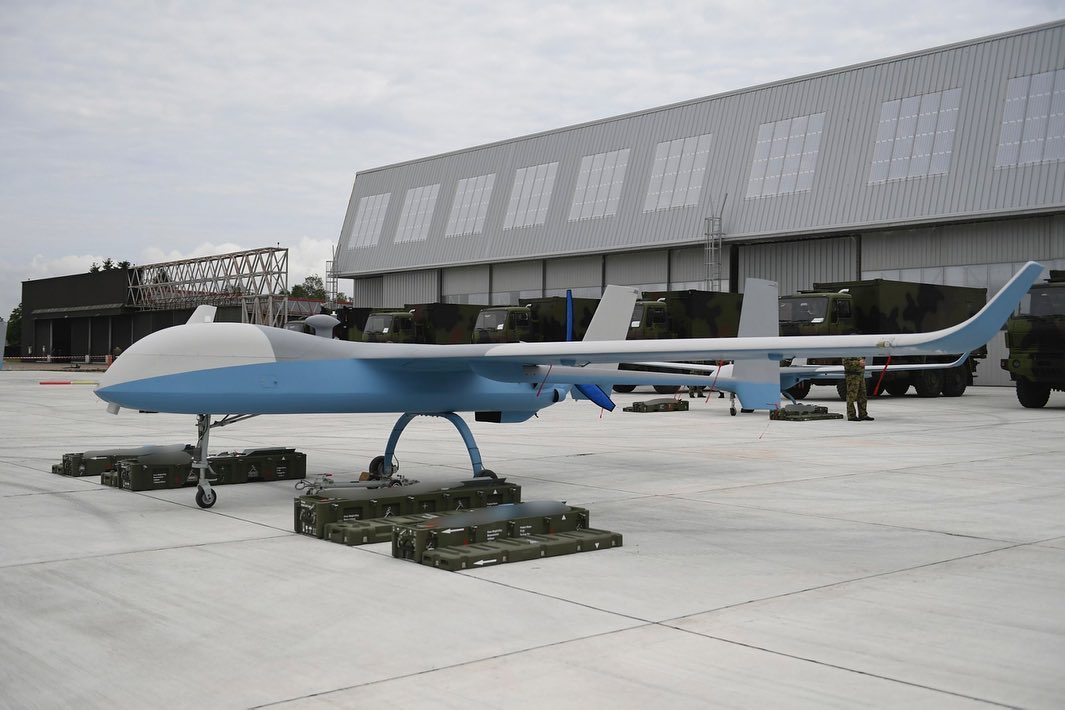
CH-95 combat drone

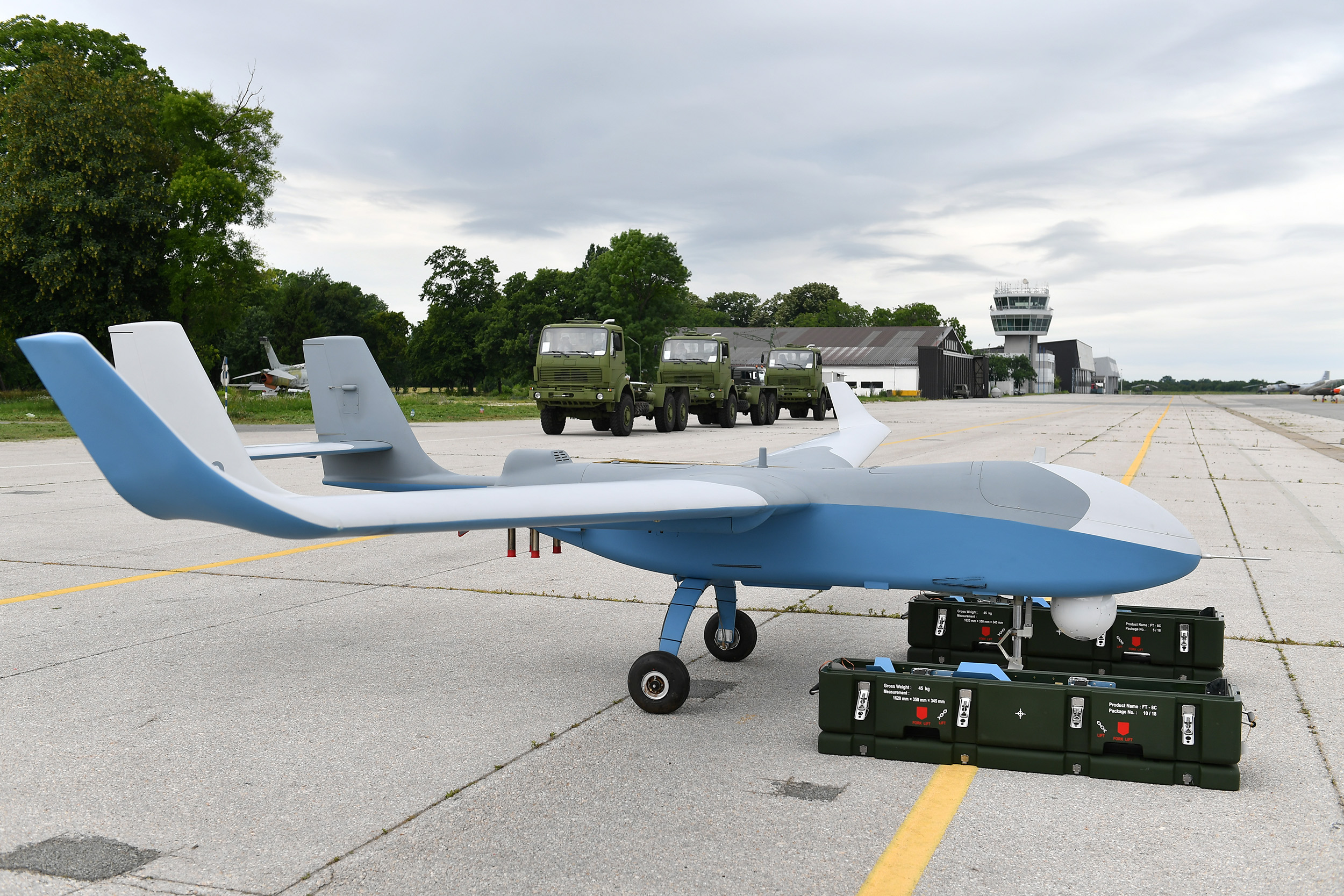
CH-92A combat drone

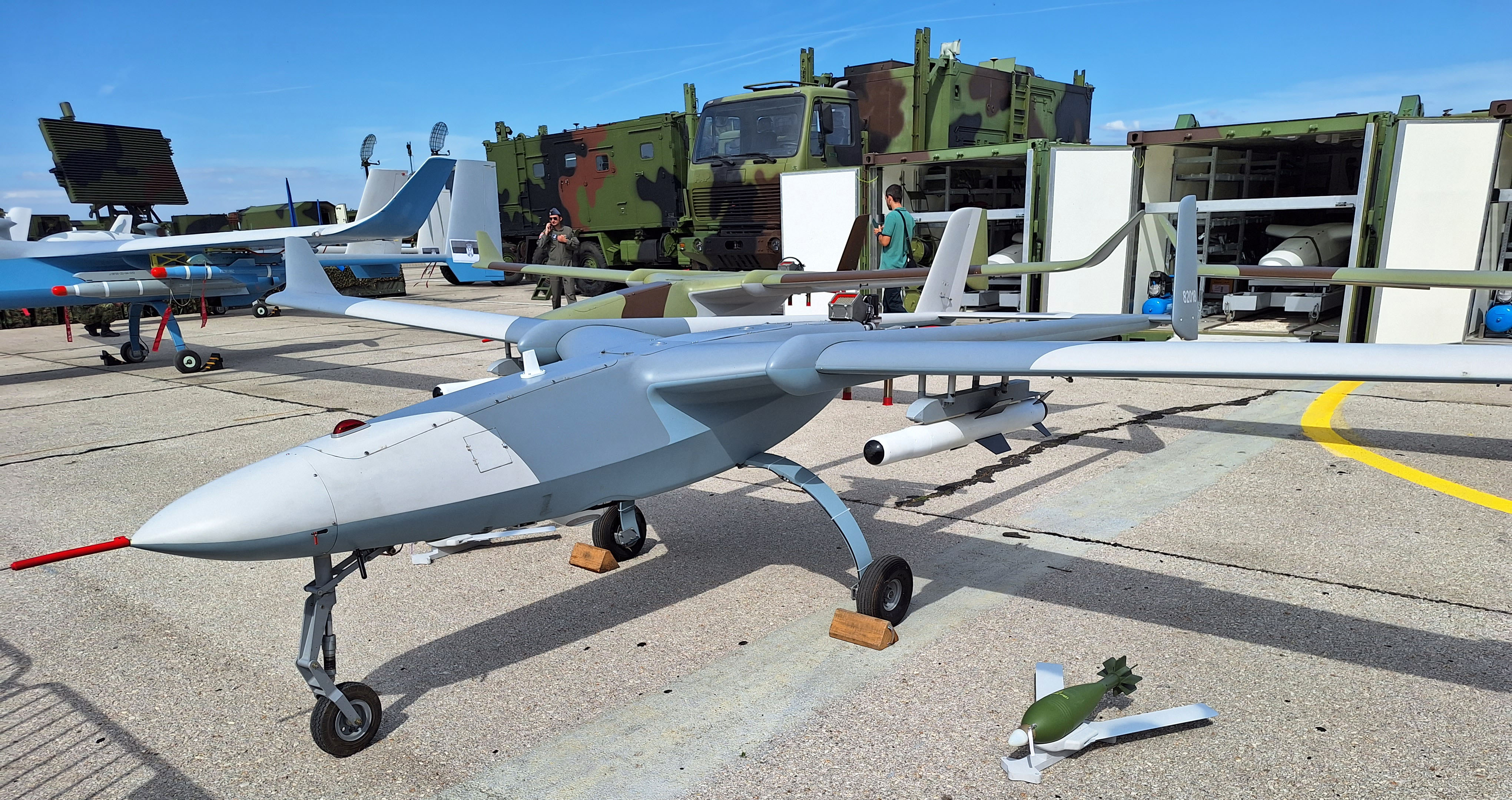
Pegaz combat drone
