= Života Ðurić =

Yugoslav commander (1963–1999)

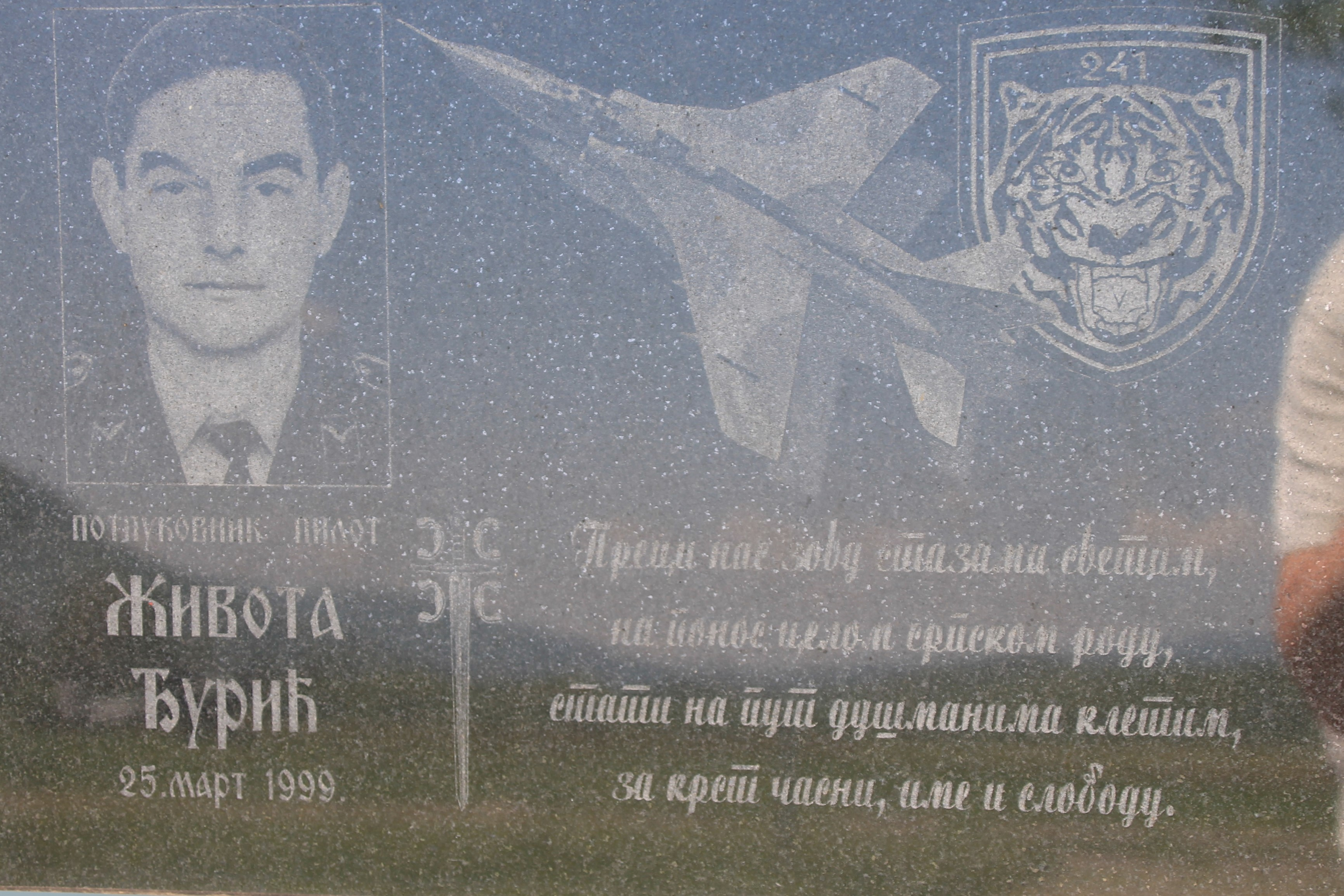
- Memorial plaque in Paraćin.
- Born: 11 April 1963; Davidovac, FPR Yugoslavia
- Died: 25 March 1999 (aged 35); Glogovac, FR Yugoslavia
- Burial place: Paraćin, Serbia
- Military career
- Allegiance: SFR Yugoslavia; FR Yugoslavia
- Branch: Air Force and Air Defence
- Service years: 1986–1999
- Rank: Pilot/Commander
- Commands: 241st Fighter-Bomber Squadron
- Conflicts: Kosovo War; NATO bombing of Yugoslavia †

Života Ðurić (Serbian Cyrillic: Живота Ђурић; 11 April 1963 – 25 March 1999) was a Yugoslav fighter pilot who fought in the Kosovo War, during which he was killed in the FR Yugoslav Strike Mission.

== Early life ==
Born in 1963, he was educated in the village of Davidovac in the Paraćin municipality. After elementary school he went to Mostar to the Military Aviation School there, and then to the Aviation Academy in Zemunik near Zadar and two more years in Titograd (today's Podgorica).

== Service as pilot ==
The service of the military pilot began in 1986 at the Petrovec airport near Skopje. There he married Biljana, who is from the vicinity of Paraćin. For six years they were in Skopje, then the squadron was moved to Kraljevo. The war found him at the position of the commander of the Tigers, a squadron of the "eagles" warplanes in the 98th Fighter-Bubbarrian Air Force Regiment. A unit that was based at the airport in Ladjevci near Kraljevo. There he becomes the commander of the 241st Fighter-Bubbarrier Squadron. That March 1999, it was clear to everyone that NATO would attack Serbia. The aviation regiment in Ladjevci had war plans, reconnaissance "eagles" recorded the positions of the KLA on Kosmet, and possible targets. The airmen approached the dislocation of manpower and equipment, the planes were removed from the airport and masked in their surroundings.

== NATO bombing ==
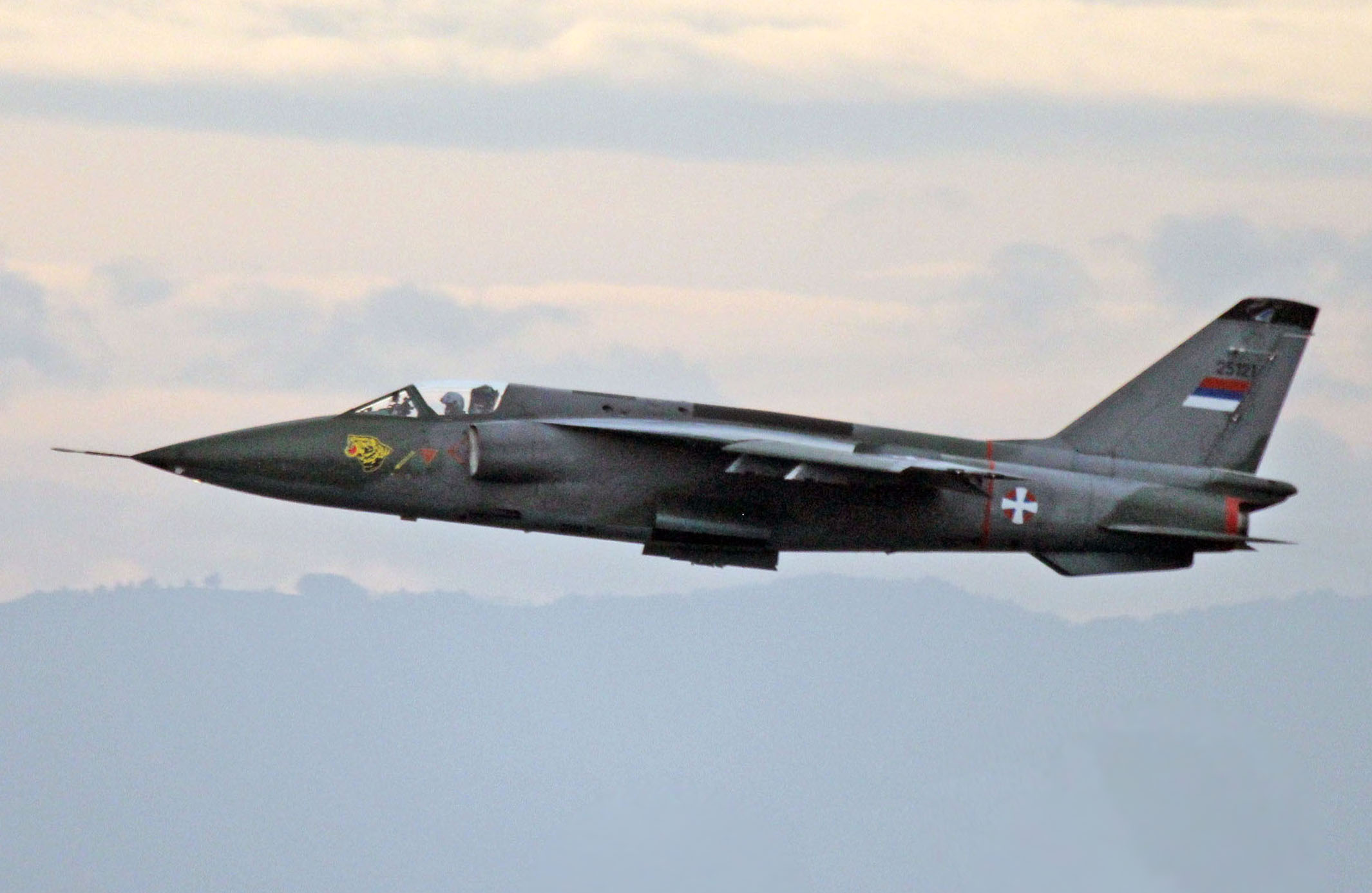
A J-22 Orao, similar to the one used by Ðurić during his career as a pilot in the Kosovo War.

The first night of the runway in Ladjevac was not hit, bombs fell between it and the mantle. In the morning, Yugoslav air forces went to attack commands, camps and KLA barracks. It was decided to use the radio-link, due to the covertness of the flight, only in extreme necessity or if the officer on the ground assesses that the attack threatens our units – said Colonel Sreto Malinović, at the time of the war in 1999, commander of the 98th Regiment.

It was flying in a sweeping flight, at a speed of 800 kilometres per hour, the planes followed the terrain configuration. A group of two or four "eagles" was usually led by a version of this two-seater aircraft - on the other seat sat a navigator whose task was to bring the aircraft precisely to the targets. The flights lasted about half an hour, and even 50 minutes when it came to the KLA's most remote positions towards Albania.

Ðurić took to the assignment on March 25, 1999. While flying over the Glogovac area, he noticed the KLA base, the command post and the warehouse, which he destroyed with two bombs. He continued his flight to a predetermined goal and at one point, when due to the configuration of the terrain he had to turn the plane on his flank, he was hit by fire from the ground. Pilot Slobodan Dimovski who accompanied him on the task, recounted: "We flew above the intersected terrain, in conditions of difficulty navigation at only fifty meters of relative height. The sun was on the sun. The mountains on the border with Albania were already making shadows. Djuric had already carried out the effect, he was in the manoeuvre up when he was hit. I saw that he fell on the position of terrorists, who had the support of NATO aviation from the air".

According to the assessment and assumption of the pilot from Ðurić’s squadron, when he could not pull the plane out, Ðurić did not want the insurgents alive, but crashed the enemy with a plane. He was missing for two days. At the time of the life of the death, their son Alexander was ten years old, and the daughter Anna, aged 9.

== Legacy ==
He was posthumously decorated and promoted. Ðurić is buried in Paraćin.

A mural dedicated to him, Milenko Pavlović as well as Zoran Radosavljević was painted around 2015. His face, in his legacy, was later painted on a Soko J-22 Orao warplane in Serbia.

He left behind his wife, son and daughter.

== See also ==
- Zoran Radosavljević
