= Airports of Serbia =

Serbian state-owned company

- Native name: Аеродроми Србије
- Romanized name: Aerodromi Srbije
- Type: Limited liability company
- Industry: Aviation
- Founded: 2 February 2016; 10 years ago
- Founder: Government of Serbia
- Headquarters: Vazduhoplovaca 24, Niš, Serbia
- Key people: Mihajlo Zdravković (Director)
- Services: Airport management
- Revenue: €4.21 million (2020) ▲
- Net income: €1.16 million (2020) ▲
- Total assets: €96.30 million (2020) ▲
- Total equity: €91.62 million (2020) ▲
- Owner: Government of Serbia (100%)
- Number of employees: 200 (2020)
- Subsidiaries: Aerodrom Trebinje d.o.o. (Bosnia and Herzegovina)
- Website: www.aerodromisrbije.rs
- Footnotes; Business ID: 07343914; Tax ID: 101531405

Airports of Serbia (Serbian: Аеродроми Србије, romanized: Aerodromi Srbije) is a Serbian state-owned company, which owns and operates five airports in Serbia. It has its head office at Niš Constantine the Great Airport in the city of Niš, Serbia.

This state-owned Public Enterprise was formed on 2nd of February 2016, by the Government of Serbia. The main tasks of the company is management, development and maintenance of the airport infrastructure in Serbia and region. Belgrade Nikola Tesla Airport is the only major airport in Serbia that is not operated by the Airports of Serbia. It is operated by French conglomerate Vinci Airports. The planned Trebinje Airport in Bosnia and Herzegovina will be the first airport outside of Serbia, owned and operated by the Airports of Serbia. The main goal is that all airports, except Belgrade Nikola Tesla Airport, become a part of the Airports of Serbia, for easier and more efficient management.

== List of airports ==
Airports of Serbia operates the following airports (bold text indicates international airports with scheduled services):

Airport names	City
**Niš Constantine the Great Airport**	Niš
**Morava Airport**	Kraljevo

It also owns the company operating the as-of-2025 under-construction Trebinje airport in Republika Srpska.

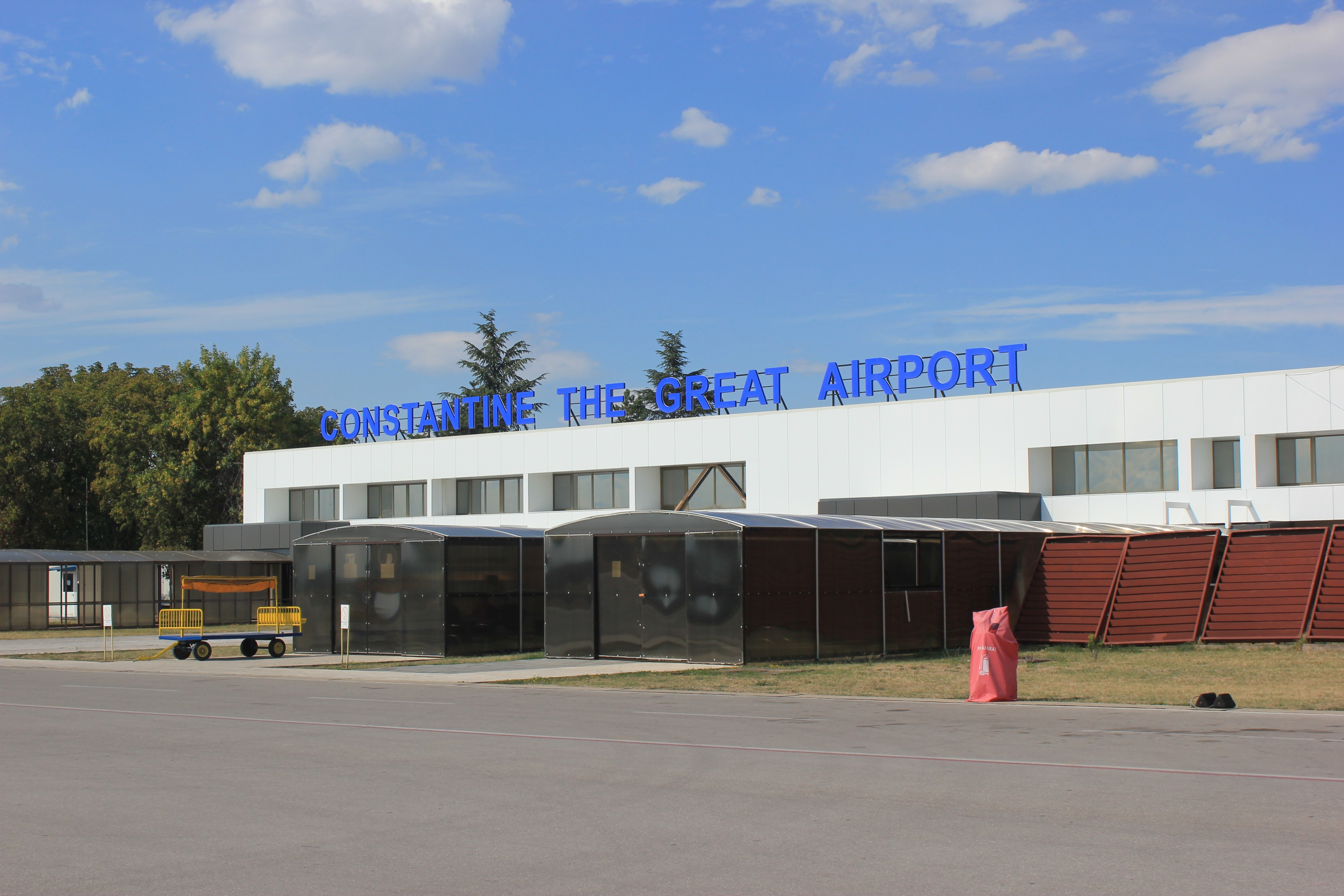
Niš Constantine the Great Airport

== See also ==
- List of airports in Serbia
- Transport in Serbia
- AirSerbia
