= Serbian Air Force and Air Defence =

Air warfare branch of the Serbian Armed Forces

- Ратно ваздухопловство и противваздухопловна одбрана Војске Србије
- Emblem of the Serbian Air Force and Air Defence
- Founded: 1912 (current form since 2006)
- Country: Serbia
- Type: Air force
- Role: Aerial warfare Aerial defence
- Size: 3,000 (2021 est.)
- Part of: Serbian Armed Forces
- Headquarters: Belgrade
- Mottos: For Freedom and Honour of the Fatherland (Serbian: За слободу и част Отаџбине, romanized: Za slobodu i čast Otadžbine)
- Anniversaries: 24 December
- Engagements: Balkan Wars; World War I

Commanders
- Chief of the Air Staff: Lt. Col. General Tiosav Janković
- Air Force Sergeant Major: Warrant officer 1st class Saša Sailović

Insignia
- Roundel

- Fin flash

- Flag

Aircraft flown
- Attack: J-22
- Fighter: MiG-29
- Helicopter: Mi-35, Mi-17, H145M, Gazelle
- Trainer: G-4, Lasta 95
- Transport: C-295, An-26

The Serbian Air Force and Air Defence (Serbian: Ратно ваздухопловство и противваздухопловна одбрана Војске Србије, romanized: Ratno vazduhoplovstvo i protivvazduhoplovna odbrana Vojske Srbije, lit. 'War Aviation and Anti-Aircraft Defence of the Serbian Armed Forces'), is the air force and air defence force of Serbia, and aerial service branch of the Serbian Armed Forces. Its mission is to guard and protect the sovereignty of Serbian airspace, and jointly with the Serbian Army, to protect territorial integrity of the country.

Serbian Air Force was established in 1912, thus making Serbia one of the first fifteen states in the world to have an air force. It was subsequently absorbed into the air forces of various Yugoslav states between 1918 and 2006.

== History ==
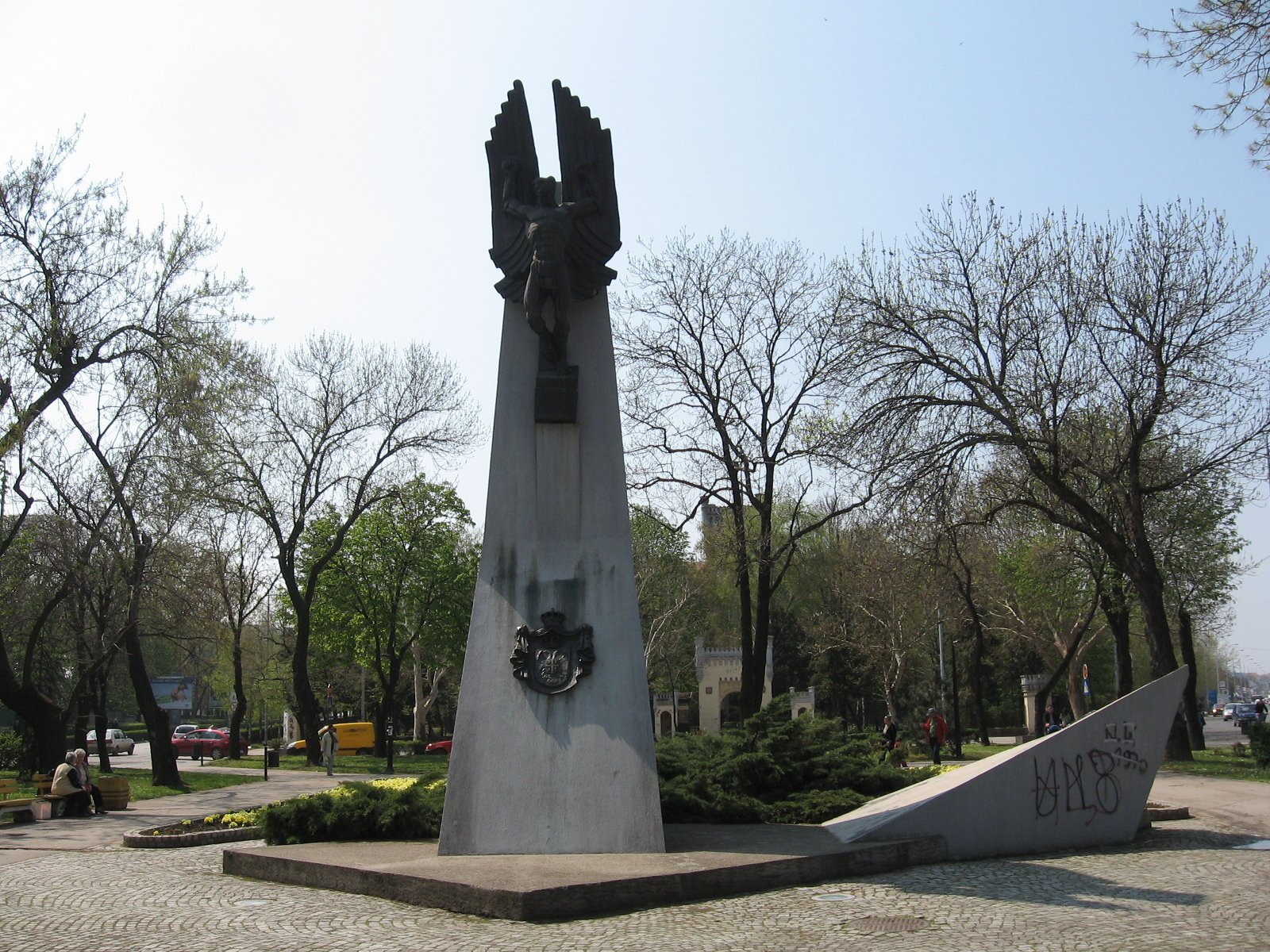
Monument to the First Class of Serbian aviators in Niš

The idea to form air forces in the Royal Serbian Army was first mentioned in the General Army Formation Act from 1893. This act envisioned that within each division of the Army be formed one air force balloon company.

The first aviation pioneer in Serbia was Lieutenant Kosta Miletić (1874–1953), trained as a balloon pilot at the Technical Aeronautical School in Saint Petersburg, Russia, from 1901 to 1902. On the recommendation of Miletić, the Royal Serbian Army posed messenger pigeon stations and bought two free spherical and one tied kite balloon from the August Ridinger company from German city of Augsburg. At the reception ceremony, on 19 April 1909, Kosta Miletić flew a spherical balloon called "Srbija". One balloon was provided from Russia. A gas chamber was ordered from the Dillmann company in Berlin, and a field winch from Saint Petersburg. A hydrogen unit was provided from the Swiss company Oerlikon. The equipment was delivered to Serbia in 1909 and 1910.

The first competition for cadet airmen was opened in 1911, and in the following year the first class of Serbian pilots started their flying training in France and got the rank of pilot. They finished the course at the beginning of the First Balkan War with aircraft and the balloons that had already been obtained prior to the outbreak of war. In the autumn of 1912, Serbia got the aircraft for its armed forces. and on 24 September 1912 by the Act of the Minister of Army Radomir Putnik, an Aviation Command was established in Niš. Serbian Aviation (Srpska avijatika) comprised the Aircraft Detachment (which counted 12 aircraft), the Balloon Company, the pigeon post and the airbase. This date is regarded as the official founding of the Serbian Air Force.

=== Balkan Wars ===
The First Balkan War broke out in October 1912; Montenegro, Bulgaria, Greece, and Serbia waged it against the Ottoman Empire. In this war, the Serbian Aviation Command had its first combat experience. In February 1913, the High Command of the Royal Serbian Army formed an expeditionary Coastal Airplane Detachment in order to aid the Montenegrin army against Ottoman troops who were reinforced at the town of Shkodra near the Adriatic coast. Air support for this formation was assigned to the newly established Coastal Airplane Squad, the first Serbian air combat unit, with 4 airplanes (Blériot XI one-seater, Blériot XI two-seater, Deperdussin TT and Farman HF.20) and 5 pilots under the command of Major Kosta Miletić. In March 1913, this combat air unit was relocated near the frontline at a newly built auxiliary airfield in the village of Barbalusi. The first reconnaissance flight was made on 20 March, by Lieutenant Živojin Stanković and Sergeant Mihajlo Petrović. In this combat-reconnaissance flight on his Farman HF.20 over the Shkodra Front on 20 March 1913, Sergeant Mihajlo Petrović was killed, thus becoming the first casualty in the history of the Serbian military aviation and the second one in world aviation history. Mihajlo Petrović, the first trained Serbian airplane pilot, completed his training at the famous Farman pilot school in France and was awarded the international FAI license no. 979 in June 1912; his Serbian pilot's license carries the number 1. The next day, pilots Lieutenant Živojin Stanković and Sergeant Miodrag Tomić successfully completed their first reconnaissance flights, and in the following days, pilots Miloš Ilić, Stanković and Tomić dropped a number of small bombs and conducted reconnaissance flights.

After Bulgaria attacked Serbia at Bregalnica, the Second Balkan War began. The first reconnaissance mission had been performed by Miodrag Tomić, and after that Tomić and Stanković took turns and during a period of a month and a half, as the war with Bulgarians lasted, the two airmen performed 21 reconnaissance missions, of which Tomić did 14 flights. During one flight above Kriva Palanka, Tomić encountered a Bulgarian plane in the air, but neither one had weapons and they just greeted one another by hand waving.

=== World War I ===
1st Serbian Aviation Squadron, equipped with 12 Dorand AR and 3 Nieuport 24, 1918

General mobilization in the summer of 1914 found the Serbian Aeroplane Wing not well prepared. The Aeroplane Wing had only 9 aeroplanes of which 7 were in flying condition. Five planes and three pilots were relocated to the auxiliary Dabića airfield. From that airfield, Captain Živojin Stanković and 2nd Lieutenant Miodrag Tomić on 13 August 1914 commenced their first reconnaissance flights in the World War I. Tomić took off from the airfield at Jevremovac on 27 August. Above Mišar he encountered an enemy plane Parabellum which opened fire on Tomić, who did not expect this but he avoided it with an appropriate and fast maneuver, so the plane did not sustain any hits. It was probably the first exchange of fire between aircraft in history. Serbian pilots who were actually skilled and experienced from the Balkan Wars had succeeded to give the valuable information about the number, the movements, and the position of the enemy troops. They contributed to early Serbian victories in 1914 at Cer Mountain, Kolubara and Drina river. At the beginning of 1915, armed with machine guns and bombs, Serbian pilots succeeded to fight back the enemy by attacking their aircraft flying over the Serbian sovereign territory or by bombing the important targets in the background positions. Because of air superiority of the Austro-Hungarian Aviation Troops over the Serbian Front, in March 1915 the French squadron (Escadrille MF 99 S) arrived under command of Captain Roger Vitrat to aid the Serbian Aeroplane Wing. The French squadron held the frontline from Smederevo to Loznica, and the Serbian wing from Smederevo to Golubac. After the conquest of Serbia by the Central Powers in the autumn of 1915 and the great retreat of the Serbian army to the Greek island of Corfu, the Salonica front was formed. During the invasion on Serbia in October 1915, Manfred von Richthofen ("Red Baron") was commenced its first combat flight as a pilot. Also, in the autumn of 1915, the first medical transport of the wounded and sick in world aviation history was conducted in Serbia. One of the ill soldiers in that first medical transport was Milan Rastislav Štefánik, a Czechoslovak pilot-volunteer. In June 1916 the reconstituted Serbian army sailed from Corfu and joined the French and British at Thessaloniki. At the Salonica front line, with the support of the Allied forces, the Serbian Aeroplane Wing was reorganized. From mid-1916 to 1918 at the Serbian part of the new established frontline, five squadrons (N521, N522, N523, N524 and N525) were operated and were staffed mostly of French and Serbian personnel. These air force units were officially known as the Serbian Army Air Service and were attached to the Supreme Command of Royal Serbian Army which was a part of Allied Macedonian Army. In the beginning of 1918 the new reorganisation was started when the 1st Squadron was formed on 17 January, and the 2nd Squadron on 1 May 1918, staffed with Serbian personnel.

Serbia formed on 8 June 1915 one of the first air defense and air warning units in the world. This was due to the massive onslaught of German and Austro-Hungarian aircraft. The first airplane shot down by ground fire unit in World War I happened over skies of Serbia. During the German air attack on city of Kragujevac on 30 September 1915, air defense artillerist Radivoje-Raka Lutovac from "Tanasko Rajić" Regiment, shot his first hit, by his artillery modified gun, a Farman airplane with two crew members.

=== Kingdom of Yugoslavia ===
The period between two world wars was marked by a significant growth of Air Force, accompanied by the production of modern and sophisticated aircraft, with then ongoing organizational-formation changes within the Air Force. With the establishment of the Kingdom of Yugoslavia, an Army Aviation Department was formed out of Serbian and ex-Austro-Hungarian (Croatian and Slovenian) personnel. In 1923, a major initiative was launched to replace World War I era aircraft still in service with more modern designs. Contracts were placed abroad and with newly established local factories. The Aviation Department was renamed the Aviation Command and placed directly under the control of the Ministry of Military and Navy. In 1930, the Aviation Command was renamed the Royal Yugoslav Air Force (Jugoslovensko kraljevsko ratno vazduhoplovstvo).

=== World War II ===
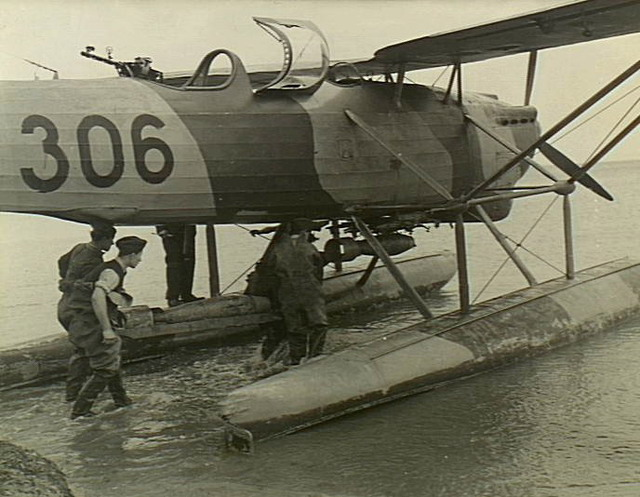
Royal Yugoslav Air Force seaplanes operating in the Western Desert, 1942

The attacking forces engaged in the April War (6 to 17 April 1941) were 2,373 aircraft strong, including 1,212 aircraft from Germany, 647 from Italy and 287 from Hungary, while the Royal Yugoslav Air Force had 494 airplanes, only 269 of a modern type. Thus the ratio in the beginning of operations was 5:1 in favor of the Axis powers, and if counting only modern Yugoslav aircraft the ratio climbs to 7:1 in favor of the Axis powers. In spite of huge logistic difficulties and acts of treason (proclamation of the puppet-state Independent State of Croatia on 10 April 1941) the Royal Yugoslav Air Force fulfilled its duties with honor. Yugoslav airmen (5th and 6th Fighter Regiment pilots especially) fought courageously against an enemy superior both technically and numerically. During the war operations a total of 1,416 take-offs was made, 993 of which were performed by fighters and 423 by bombers. During this short war 135 flight crew members and 576 ground personnel lost their lives. About 300 Royal Yugoslav Air Force personnel evacuated, first to Greece then to Crete. After the Battle of Crete they went on to the deserts of the Near and Middle East, where for a short time they found a safe place. In June 1941 the 20th Hydroaviation Squadron under command of Lieutenant Vladeta Petrović with their no surrender war flag was renamed in the 2nd Yugoslav Squadron, attached to No. 230 Squadron RAF. Up until 23 April 1942 the squadron flew 912 combat mission (1,760 flying hours) and lost four aircraft. The main mission of the squadron was anti-submarine patrol and protected allied shipping.

=== Socialist Yugoslavia ===
After World War II the Air Force underwent several developmental stages, the first major air force modernization being performed from 1953 to 1959. Aircraft made in the West (such as German Dornier Do 28) were introduced thus broaching the era of jet aviation. With the forming of first helicopter squadron in 1954 the chopper units were also incorporated within the reorganised Air Forces branch, renamed to Yugoslav Air Force (Jugoslovensko ratno vazduhoplovstvo). At the beginning of 1960s Soviet supersonic fighter MiG-21 was introduced, followed by intensive growth of Yugoslav aviation industry in that period. A number of jet planes prototypes were constructed, which served as basis for the development of training fighters and fighter aircraft, such as Soko G-2 Galeb and J-21 Jastreb, G-4 Super Galeb and Soko J-22 Orao as well as the most advanced Soviet fighter aircraft MiG-29, was introduced in the late 1980s.

=== Yugoslav Wars ===
In June 1991 the Slovenes resistance to re-imposition of federal control over Slovenia rapidly escalated into an armed conflict with Yugoslav People's Army. During the Ten-Day War in Slovenia two Yugoslav Air Force helicopters were shot down, while it launched air strikes on TV transmitters and Slovenian territorial defence positions. During the War in Croatia, the Yugoslav Air Force was active providing transport and close air support missions to Yugoslav Ground Forces, but was gradually forced to abandon air bases outside of ethnic Serbian held areas. The Yugoslav Air Force equipment in Bosnia and Herzegovina was given to the new Republika Srpska Air Force and used during the War in Bosnia. In 1991 and 1992, the Yugoslav Air Force lost a total of 46 airplanes and helicopters in Slovenia, Croatia and Bosnia-Herzegovina. The bulk of the Yugoslav Air Force was inherited by the newly-formed Air Force of Serbia and Montenegro in 1992.

=== 1999 NATO bombing ===
An important portion of the 1999 war between Yugoslavia and the NATO coalition involved combat between the Air Force of Serbia and Montenegro (Ratno vazduhoplovstvo Srbije i Crne Gore), which was the predecessor of today's Serbian Air Force, and the opposing air forces of NATO. United States Air Force F-15s and F-16s flying mainly from Italian air bases attacked the defending Serbo-Montenegrin fighters, usually MiG-29s, which were in bad shape, due to lack of spare parts and maintenance. A total of six MiG-29s were shot down in 1999, of which three were shot down by USAF F-15s, one by a USAF F-16, and one by a RNAF F-16. One aircraft was hit by friendly fire from the ground. Another four were destroyed on the ground. During the course of the air war, Serbo-Montenegrin anti-aircraft defenses downed a USAF F-16C and an F-117 Nighthawk, the first stealth aircraft ever to be shot down in combat, along with dozens of UAVs.

== Missions ==
Two primary missions of the Serbian Air Force and Air Defence are: maintaining airspace dominance over the country (including intercepting and eliminating airspace violators) and providing air support and transport for ground forces. Other important role is responding to natural disasters.

== Structure ==
Air Force and Air Defence Command attached unit
Air Force base Air Defence base Air Surveillance station

The Serbian Air Force and Air Defence consists of four brigades, two independent battalions directly attached to the Air Force and Air Defence Command, as well as the Aeronautical Overhaul Institute and Air Medical Institute. There are three operating air bases: Batajnica Air Base, Lađevci Air Base, and Niš Air Base. In addition other bases (Jakovo, Zuce, Pančevo, Kragujevac, Novi Sad) house air defence units. Long-range surveillance radar stations are located at Novi Banovci and Murtenica.

- Air Force and Air Defence Command
  - 210th Signal Battalion (Belgrade)
  - 333rd Engineer Battalion (Pančevo)
- 204th Air Brigade
  - 101st Fighter Squadron (Batajnica Air Base)
  - 138th Transport Squadron (Batajnica Air Base)
  - 252nd Training Squadron (Batajnica Air Base)
  - 890th Mixed Helicopter Squadron (Batajnica Air Base)
  - 177th Air Defence Artillery Missile Battalion (Batajnica Air Base)
  - 24th Air Technical Battalion (Batajnica Air Base)
  - 17th Air Base Security Battalion (Batajnica Air Base)
- 98th Air Brigade
  - 241st Fighter-Bomber Squadron (Lađevci Air Base)
  - 714th Anti-armor Helicopter Squadron (Lađevci Air Base)
  - 119th Mixed Helicopter Squadron (Niš Air Base)
  - 353rd Reconnaissance Squadron (Lađevci Air Base)
  - 98th Air Defence Artillery Missile Battalion (Lađevci Air Base)
  - 98th Air Technical Battalion (Lađevci Air Base)
  - 98th Air Base Security Battalion (Lađevci Air Base)
  - 161st Air Base Security Battalion (Niš Air Base)
- 250th Air Defence Missile Brigade
  - Command Battery (Belgrade)
  - 1st Air Defence Missile Battalion (Zuce)
  - 2nd Air Defence Missile Battalion (Pančevo)
  - 3rd Air Defence Missile Battalion (Jakovo)
  - 230th Air Defence Self-Propelled Missile Battalion (Niš)
  - 240th Air Defence Self-Propelled Missile Battalion (Novi Sad)
  - 310th Air Defence Self-Propelled Missile Battalion (Kragujevac)
- 126th Air Surveillance, Early Warning and Guidance Brigade
  - Command Company (Belgrade)
  - 20th ASEWG Battalion (Batajnica Air Base)
  - 31st ASEWG Battalion (Lađevci Air Base)
  - Air Maintenance and Supply Battalion (Batajnica Air Base)
- Aeronautical Overhaul Institute "Moma Stanojlović"
- Aeromedical Institute

== Equipment ==
=== Aircraft ===
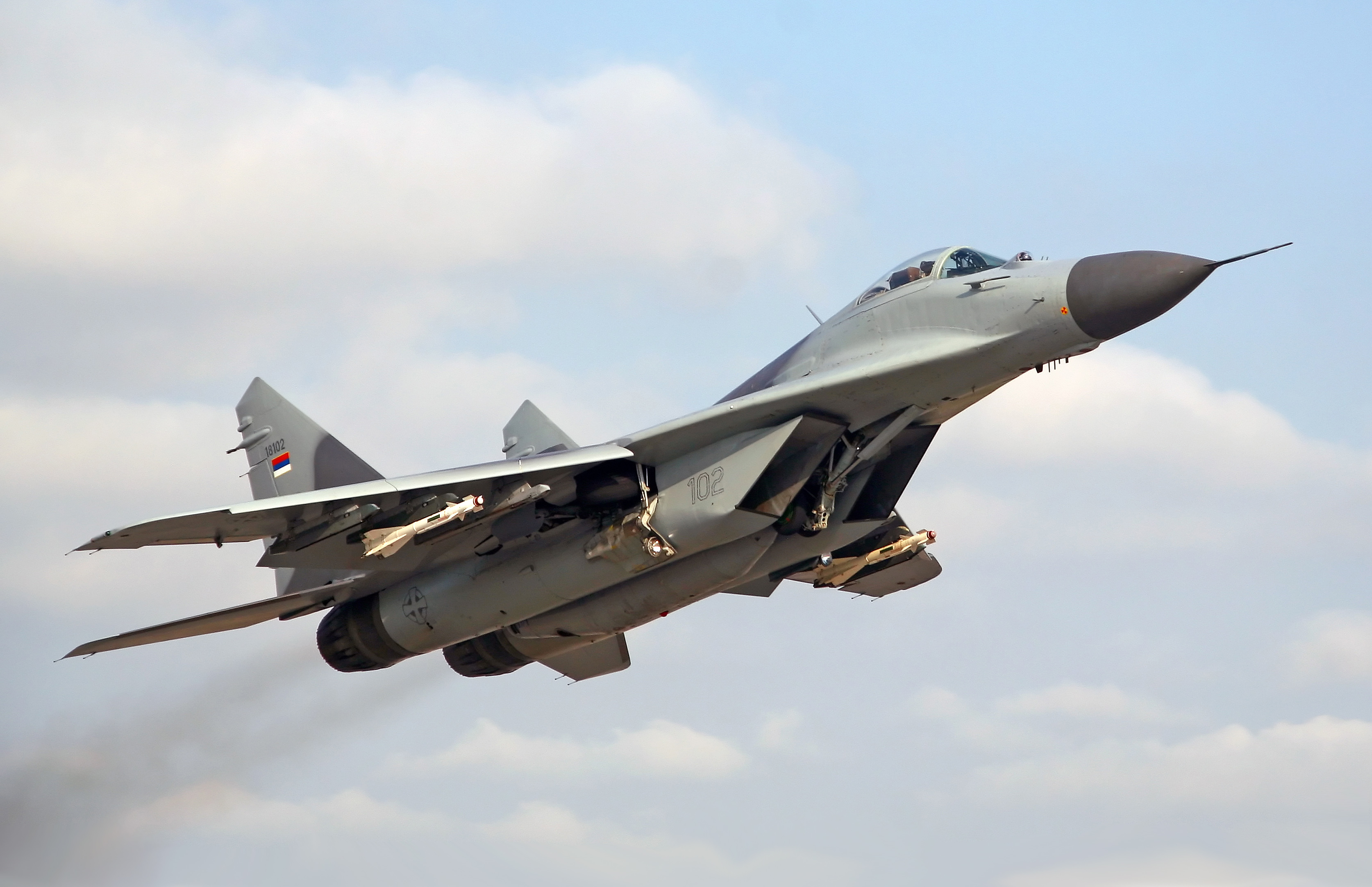
MiG-29 of the 101st Fighter Squadron

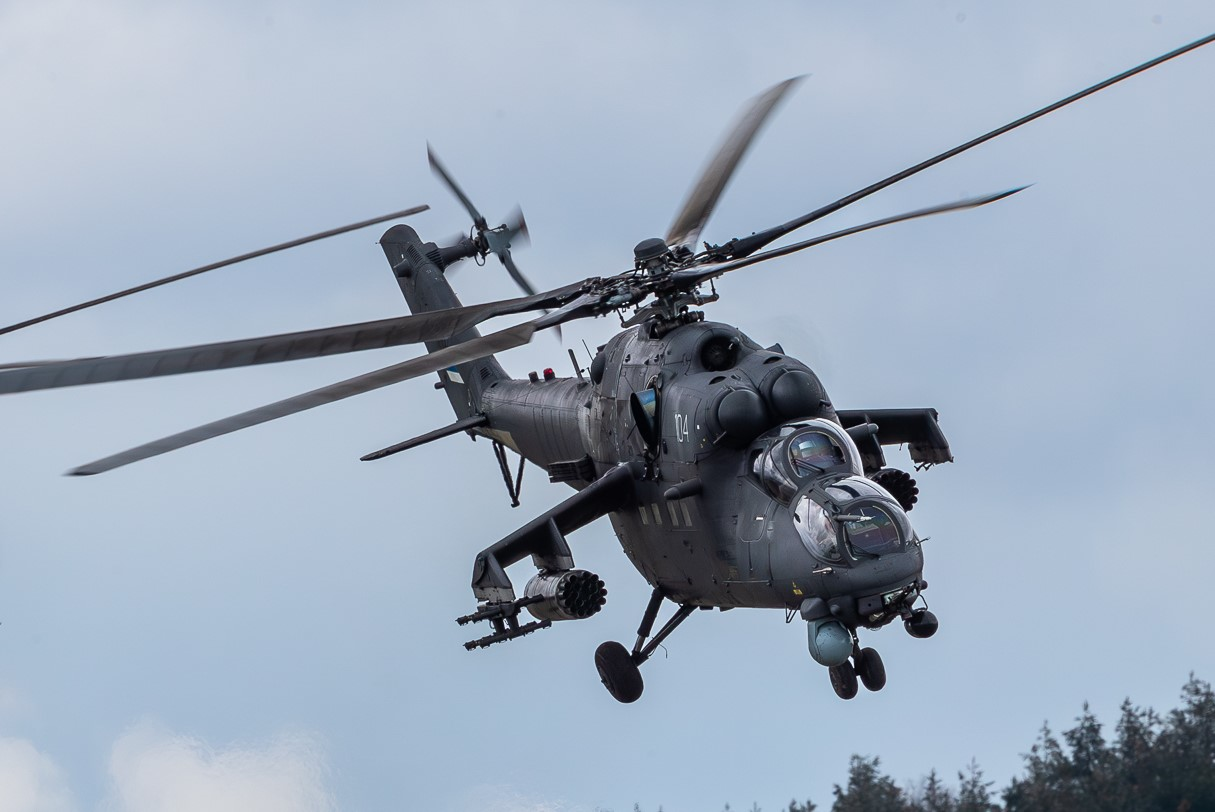
Mi-35 of the 714th Anti-armor Helicopter Squadron

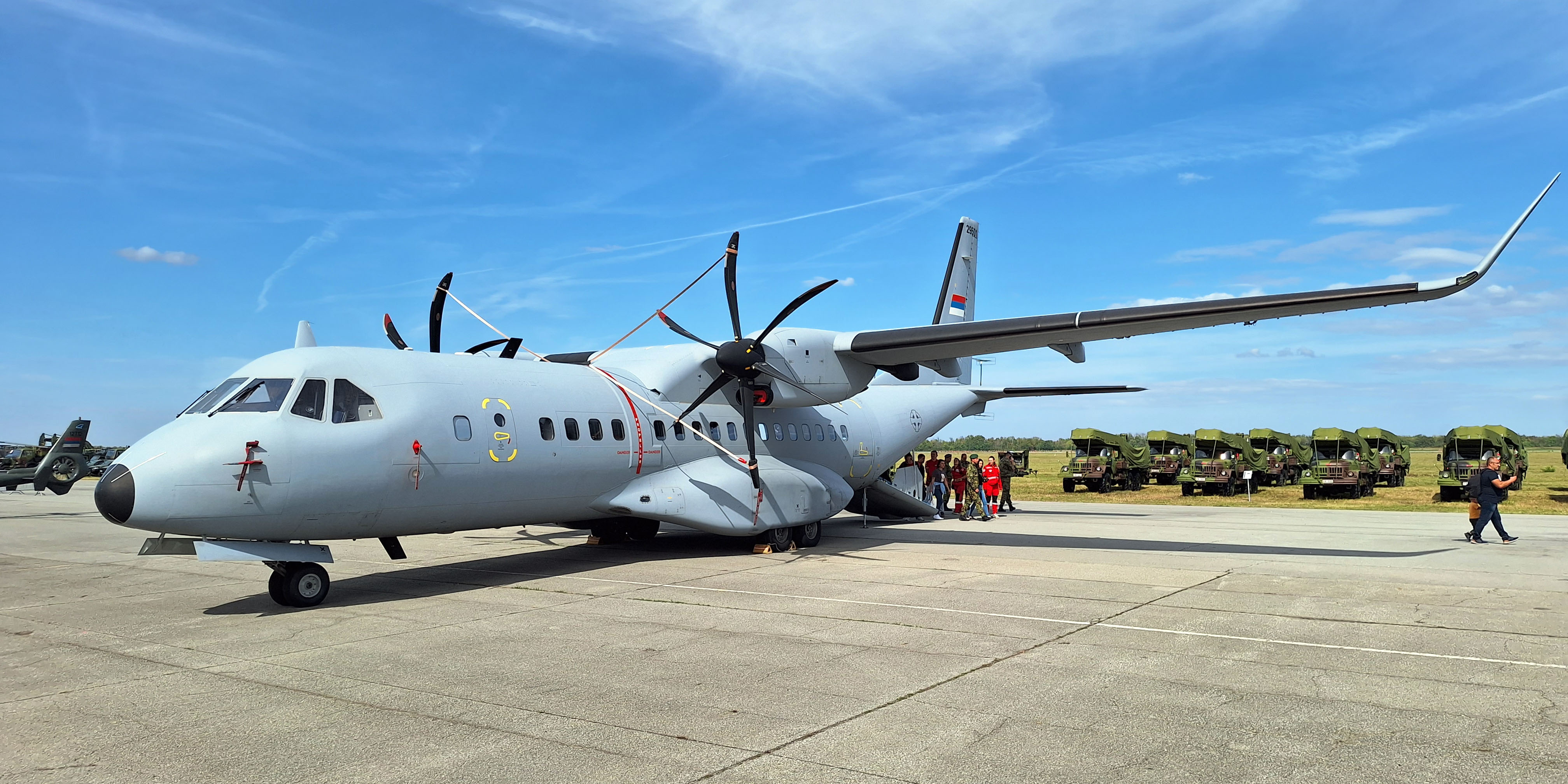
C-295 of the 138th Transport Squadron

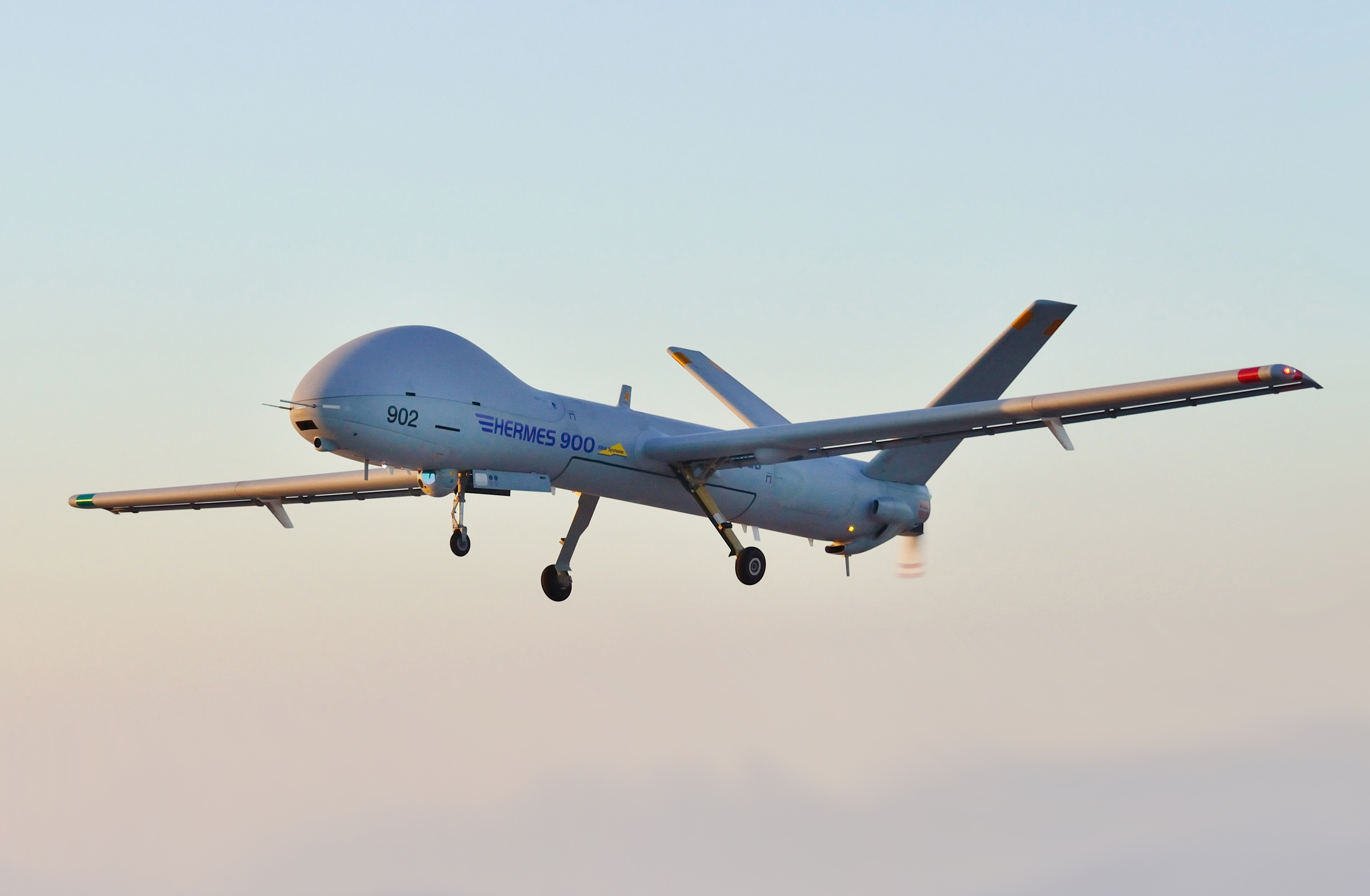
Hermes 900 of the 353rd Reconnaissance Squadron

| Aircraft | Origin | Type | Variant | In service | Notes |
Combat aircraft
| Mikoyan MiG-29 | Soviet Union | multirole | MiG-29SM | 10 | 1 lost in 2026 |
| Dassault Rafale | France | multirole | Rafale F4 | | 12 on order |
| Soko J-22 Orao | Yugoslavia | attack | J-22B | 17 | |
Transport aircraft
| Airbus C-295 | Spain | transport | C-295W | 2 | |
| Antonov An-26 | Soviet Union | transport | An-26 | 1 | |
Helicopters
| Mil Mi-24 | Russia | attack | Mi-35 | 15 | 4 on order |
| Mil Mi-17 | Russia | utility | Mi-17V-5 | 5 | |
| Airbus H145 | France | utility | H145M | 16 | |
| Aérospatiale Gazelle | France | observation | 341/42 | 25 | |
Trainer aircraft
| Mikoyan MiG-29 | Soviet Union | conversion trainer | MiG-29UB | 3 | |
| Soko G-4 | Yugoslavia | jet trainer | G-4M | 15 | |
| Utva Lasta | Serbia | trainer | Lasta 95V | 14 | |
Unmanned aerial vehicles
| Elbit Hermes | Israel | combat / reconnaissance | Hermes 900 | 3 | |
| CASC Rainbow | China | combat | CH-95/92 | 10 / 6 | |
| Utva Pegaz | Serbia | combat | Pegaz | 12 | |

=== Air defence ===
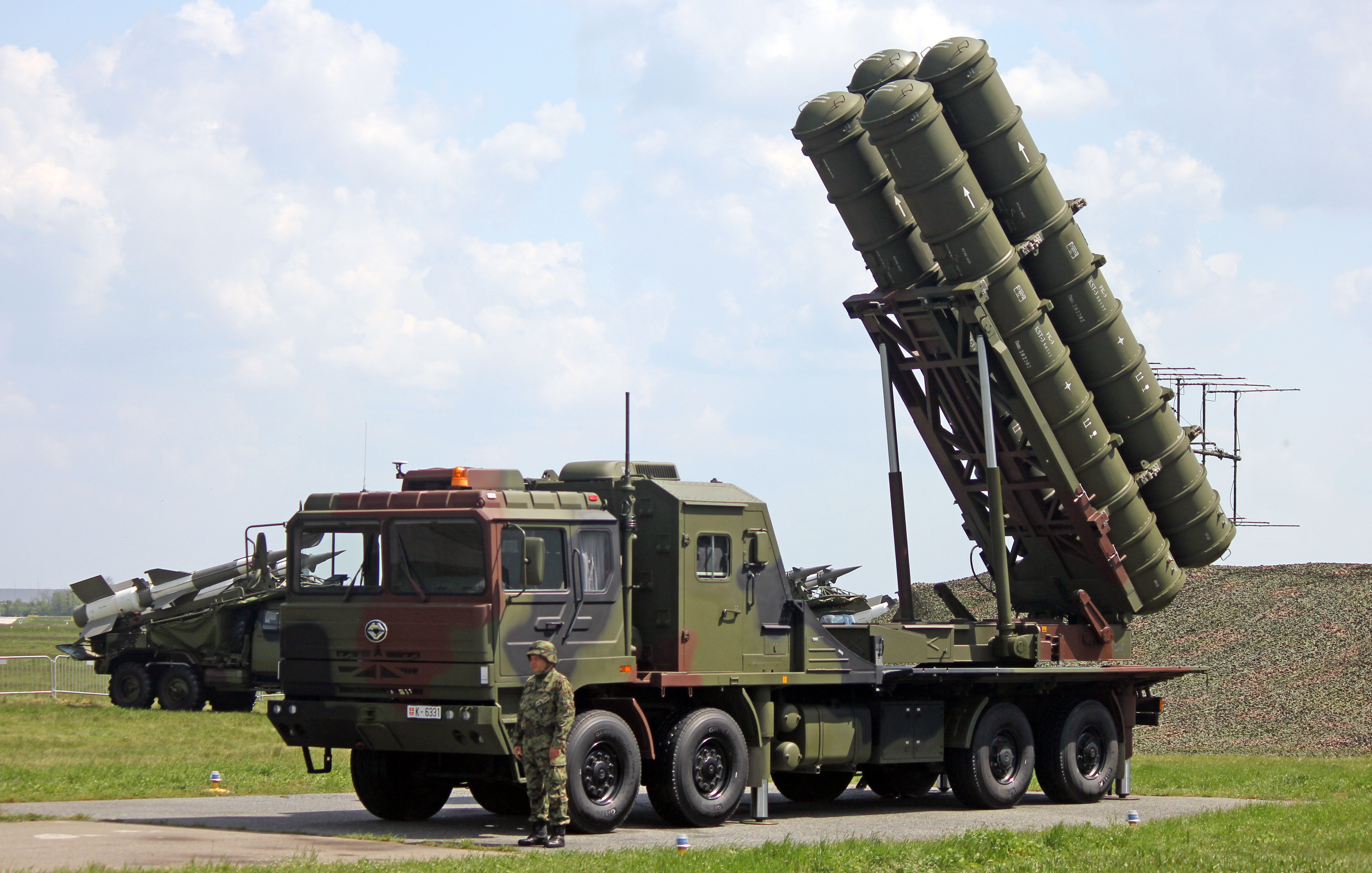
HQ-22 of the 2nd Air Defense Missile Battalion

| Name | Origin | Type | Variant | In service | Notes |
Surface-to-air missile systems
| HQ-9 | China | long-range | HQ-9BE | | on order |
| HQ-22 | China | medium-range | FK-3 | 4 batteries | |
| HQ-17 | China | short-range | HQ-17AE | 2 batteries | |
| Pantsir | Russia | short-range | Pantsir S1 | 1 battery | 2 batteries on order |
| 2K12 Kub | Soviet Union | short-range | Kub M2 | 3 batteries | |
| S-125 Neva | Soviet Union | short-range | Neva M1T | 5 batteries | |

=== Radars ===
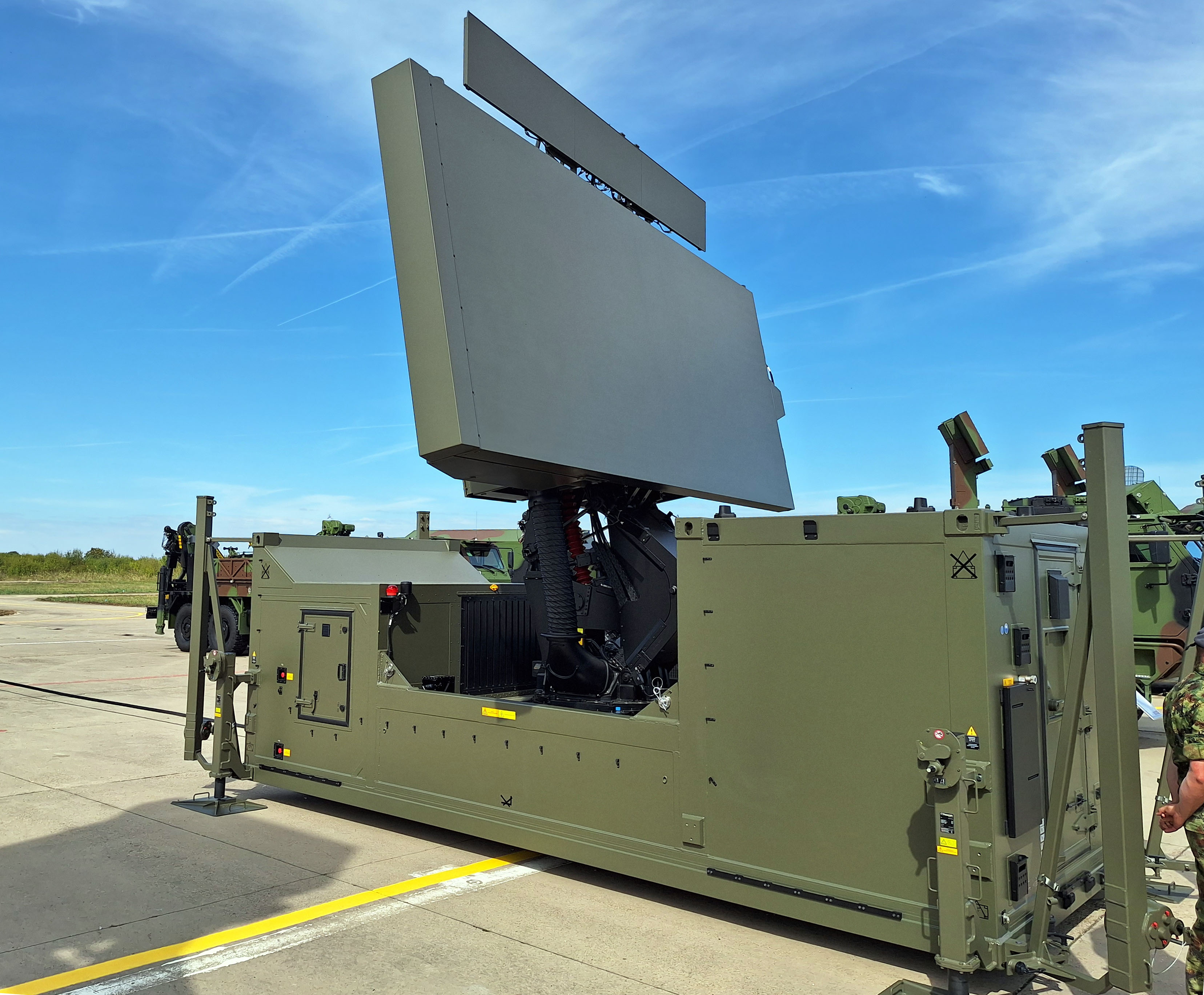
Thales GM400α of the 20th ASEWG Battalion

| Name | Origin | Type | Range | In service | Notes |
3D radars
| Thales GM400α | France | surveillance | long-range | 4 | |
| Thales GM200 | France | surveillance and target acquisition | medium-range | 6 | |
| Thales GS-40 | France | surveillance and target acquisition | short-range | 12 | |
Surface-to-air missile system radars
| TTDR | China | surveillance | long-range | 1 | part of HQ-22 |
| JSG-100 | China | surveillance | long-range | 4 | part of HQ-22 |
| H-200 | China | target acquisition | long-range | 4 | part of HQ-22 |
| P-18 | Soviet Union | surveillance | medium-range | 5 | part of S-125 Neva |
| P-40 | Soviet Union | surveillance | medium-range | 3 | part of 2K12 Kub |

== Ranks ==
=== Officers ===
The rank insignia of commissioned officers.

| Rank group | General/Flag/Air officers | | | | Senior officers | | | Junior officers | | | |
|---|---|---|---|---|---|---|---|---|---|---|---|
| Serbian Air Force and Air Defence | | | | | | | | | | | |
| Serbian Air Force and Air Defence | Генерал; General | Генерал-потпуковник; General-potpukovnik | Генерал-мајор; General-major | Бригадни генерал Brigadni general | Пуковник; Pukovnik | Потпуковник; Potpukovnik | Мајор; Major | Капетан прве класе Kapetan prve klase | Капетан; Kapetan | Поручник; Poručnik | Потпоручник; Potporučnik |

=== Enlisted ===
The rank insignia of non-commissioned officers and enlisted personnel.

| Rank group | Senior NCOs | | | | | Junior NCOs | | Enlisted | |
|---|---|---|---|---|---|---|---|---|---|
| Serbian Air Force and Air Defence | | | | | | | | | |
| Serbian Air Force and Air Defence | Заставник I класе Zastavnik I klase | Заставник; Zastavnik | Старији Водник I класе Stariji Vodnik I klase | Старији Водник; Stariji Vodnik | Водник; Vodnik | Млађи водник Mlađi vodnik | Десетар; Desetar | Разводник; Razvodnik | Војник; Vojnik |

== See also ==
- Yugoslav Royal Air Force
- Yugoslav Air Force
- Air Force of Serbia and Montenegro

== Bibliography ==
- Aleksandar M. Ognjević; Ognjan M. Petrović; Nenad M. Miklušev, eds. (2015). Serbian Air Force Memorial – Miodrag P. Tomic. Leadensky Books. ISBN 978-86-917625-1-3.
- Ciglić, Boris (2009). Wings of Serbia 1912 – 1920. Infinitas d.o.o. ISBN 978-86-6045-005-2.
- Nikolić, Djordie & Ognjević, Akeksandar M. (2021). Dornier: The Yugoslav Saga 1926-2007. Lublin, Poland: Kagero Publishing. ISBN 978-83-66673-61-8.
