= 241st Fighter-Bomber Squadron =

- 241. ловачко-бомбардерска авијацијска ескадрила
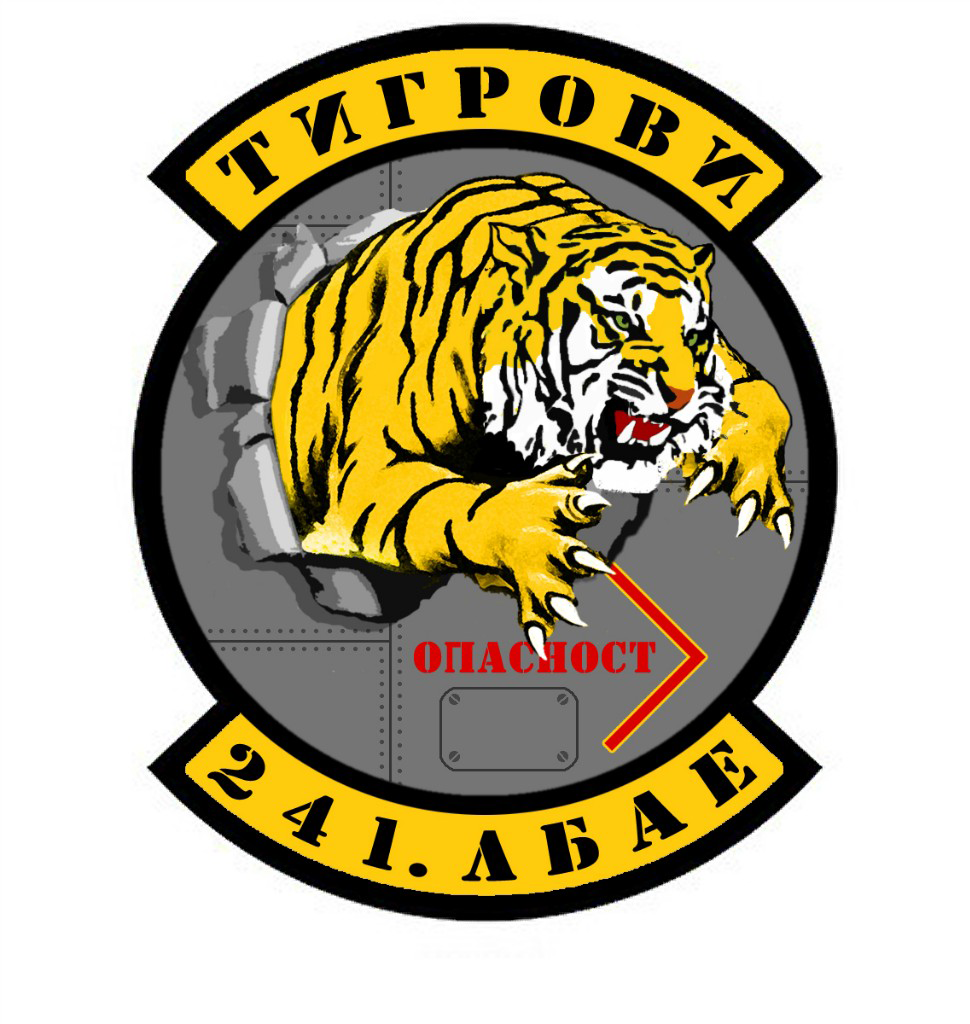
- Active: 1961 – present
- Country: Serbia
- Branch: Serbian Air Force and Air Defence
- Type: Flying squadron
- Role: Aerial support Aerial bombardment
- Part of: 98th Air Brigade
- Garrison/HQ: Lađevci Air Base
- Nickname(s): Tigers (Tigrovi)
- Anniversaries: 1 April
- Engagements: Yugoslav Wars

Commanders
- Current commander: Lieutenant Colonel Nikola Buša
- Notable commanders: Lieutenant Colonel Života Ðurić †

241st Fighter-Bomber Squadron "Tigers" (Serbian: 241. ловачко-бомбардерска авијацијска ескадрила "Тигрови", romanized: 241. lovačko-bombarderska avijacijska eskadrila "Tigrovi") is a squadron of the 98th Air Brigade of the Serbian Air Force and Air Defence and based at Lađevci Air Base.

== History ==
With the reorganization of the former Yugoslav People's Army in 1961 the squadrons of the Yugoslav Air Force received three-digit insignia, and the fighter-bomber squadrons thus received insignia with the initial number two. In April 1961, the 241st Fighter-Bomber Aviation Squadron equipped with American F-84G Thunderjet fighter-bomber (armed with 198) was formed at the Skopski Petrovec Air Base, within the 198th Fighter-Bomber Aviation Regiment.

The 198th Fighter-Bomber Aviation Regiment became the 98th Air Brigade in 1966 and the same year the first F-84G of 241st Fighter-Bomber Aviation Squadron got a stylized drawing of a tiger's head on its nose which was the emblem of the 98th Air Brigade (otherwise the tiger was a radio call sign of the unit). In 1971 began the rearmament of units with domestic light attack planes J-21 Jastreb, from 1972 the aircraft bore the sign of a cobra on their noses (previously they also had a drawing of a tiger) and the emblem of the tiger was then given to the J-21s from the 235th Fighter-Bomber Aviation Squadron at the Lađevci Air Base.

The first J-22s of the 241st Fighter-Bomber Aviation Squadron were two-seater INJ-22s borrowed from reconnaissance squadrons in 1986, while newly produced J-22 attack aircraft intended for the unit began arriving at the end of that year, and pilot retraining was completed next year.

=== War in Croatia ===
The squadron took part in the fighting in 1991, at the beginning of October, due to the distance of the Skopski Petrovec Air Base from the war zone, most of the personnel and equipment of the 241st Fighter-Bomber Aviation Squadron moved to the Dubrava Air Base near Tuzla. They stayed there for two months, during which time they made 127 combat flights with 80 flying hours, mostly over Posavina and eastern Slavonia. One plane was severely damaged by the light portable missile system Strela-2M on November 15, but the pilot managed to land at Dubrava Air Base. In February 1992, the unit was transferred to Lađevci Air Base as a part of agreement of withdrawal of Yugoslav forces from Croatia and Bosnia-Herzegovina.

=== Kosovo War ===
During the Kosovo War, the fighter-bomber aviation of the Serbia and Montenegro Air Force and Air Defense carried out 31 flights with G-4 Super Galeb and J-22 Orao aircraft with 18 flying hours: 25 flights were combat (19 with fire action) with 15.25 flying hours, 6 overflights were performed. Out of that, the 241st Fighter-Bomber Aviation Squadron performed 10 flights with all 10 fire actions (according to some unofficial information, 13 flights, all with fire action bombs).

On March 25, 1999, the commander of unit, major Života Đurić was shot down and killed by ground fire after successfully carrying out the task of destroying Kosovo Liberation Army base near Glogovac. Đurić was posthumously awarded the rank of lieutenant colonel.

== Missions ==
The main tasks of 241st Fighter Bomber Squadron are aerial firing support to ground troops and aerial bombardment.

== Bases ==
- Skopski Petrovec Air Base (1961–1992)
- Lađevci Air Base (1992–present)

== Equipment ==
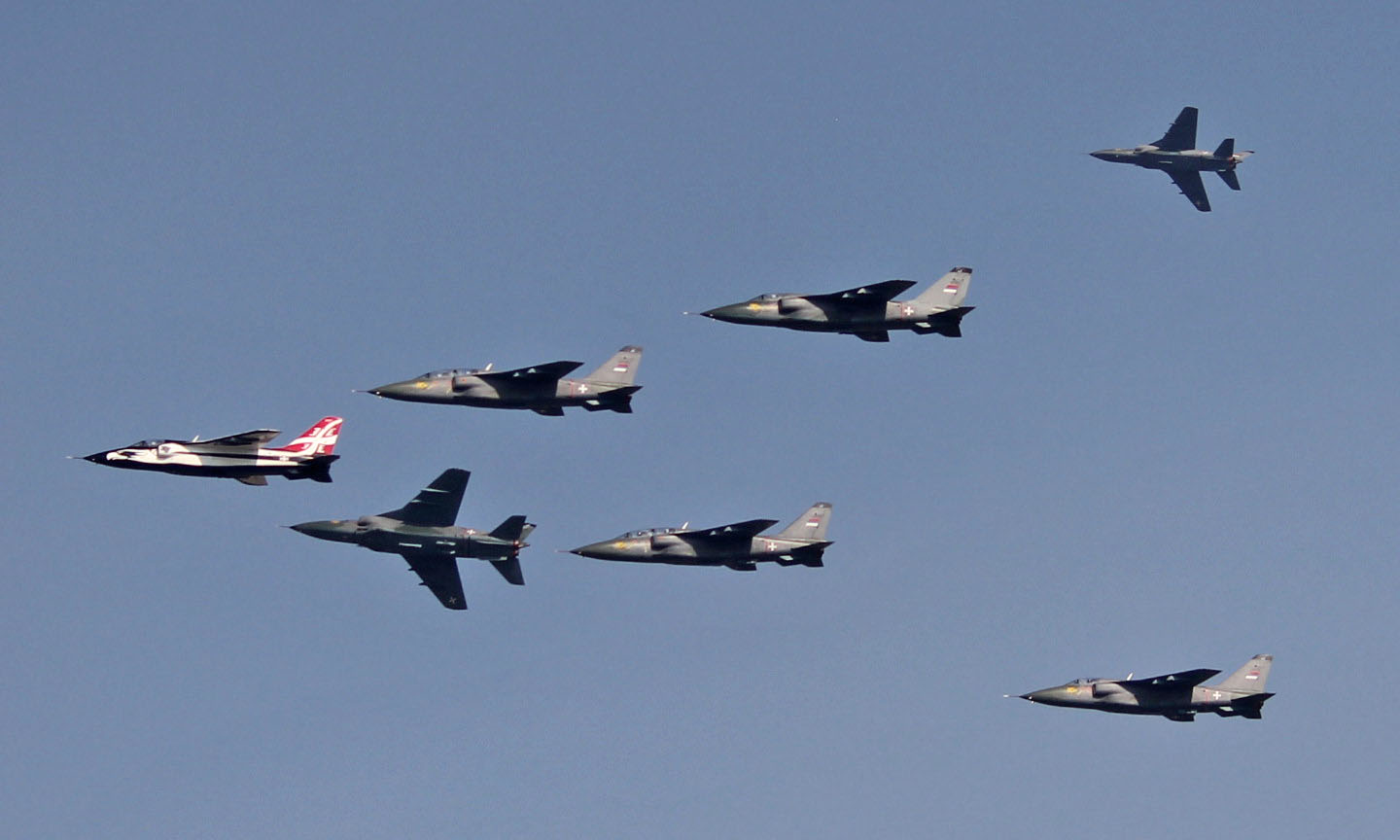
J-22s of the 241st Fighter-Bomber Squadron

=== Current ===
- Soko J-22 Orao
- Soko G-4 Super Galeb

=== Retired ===
- Soko J-21 Jastreb
- Republic F-84 Thunderjet
