= Lađevci (Kraljevo) =

Lađevci Лађевци (Serbian)
- Village (Selo)
- Location within Serbia
- Coordinates: 43°49′N 20°36′E
- Country: Serbia
- Municipality: Kraljevo

Population (2002)
  - Total: 1,258
- Time zone: UTC+1 (CET)
  - Summer (DST): UTC+2 (CEST)

Lađevci is a village situated in Kraljevo municipality in Serbia. According to the 2002 census, the village has a population of 1,258 people.
