= Morava Airport =

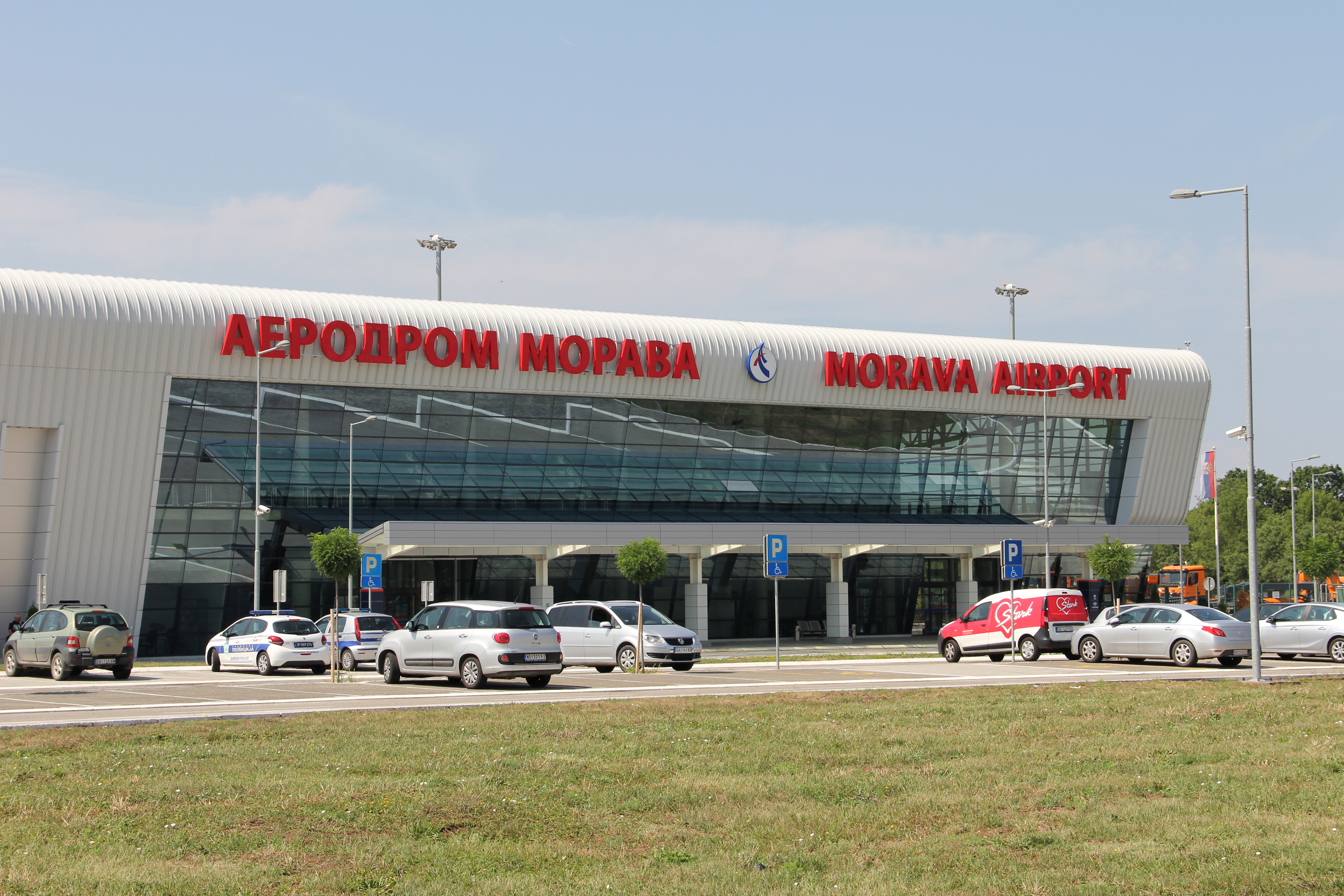
- IATA: KVO; ICAO: LYKV

Summary
- Airport type: International/military
- Owner: Government of Serbia
- Operator: Airports of Serbia
- Serves: Kraljevo, Čačak, Kragujevac
- Location: Lađevci, Serbia
- Focus city for: Air Serbia
- Elevation AMSL: 686 ft (209 m)
- Coordinates: 43°49′07″N 020°35′07″E
- Website: kvo.aerodromisrbije.rs

Map
- Location within Serbia

Runways
Direction	Length		Surface
Direction	ft	m	Surface
14/32	7,431	2,265	Asphalt

Statistics (2025)
- Passengers: 14,713 ▲6.8%
- Aircraft movements: 598 ▼0.7%

Morava Airport (Serbian: Аеродром Морава / Aerodrom Morava) (IATA: KVO, ICAO: LYKV), also known as Lađevci Airport (Аеродром Лађевци / Aerodrom Lađevci), is a joint civilian–military airport in Lađevci, Serbia – some 15 km (9.3 mi) from Kraljevo, 25 km (16 mi) from Čačak, and 39 km (24 mi) from Kragujevac. It is the smallest passenger airport in Serbia.

The military part of the airport, known as the Lađevci Airbase and operated by the Serbian Air Force and Air Defence, is the older of the two sections, having been built in 1967. It became more active in 1992 and now hosts many units of the 98th Air Brigade.

The civilian terminal opened in 2019 after a long effort to ready the airport for international flights, and is operated by state-owned company Airports of Serbia under the name "Morava Airport", after the nearby West Morava river. Air Serbia flies to Istanbul year-round and Thessaloniki and Tivat seasonally under a PSO (public service obligation) contract. It has been praised by government officials as an important transport link, but also criticised for perceived underperformance and inefficiencies.

== History ==
=== Airbase ===
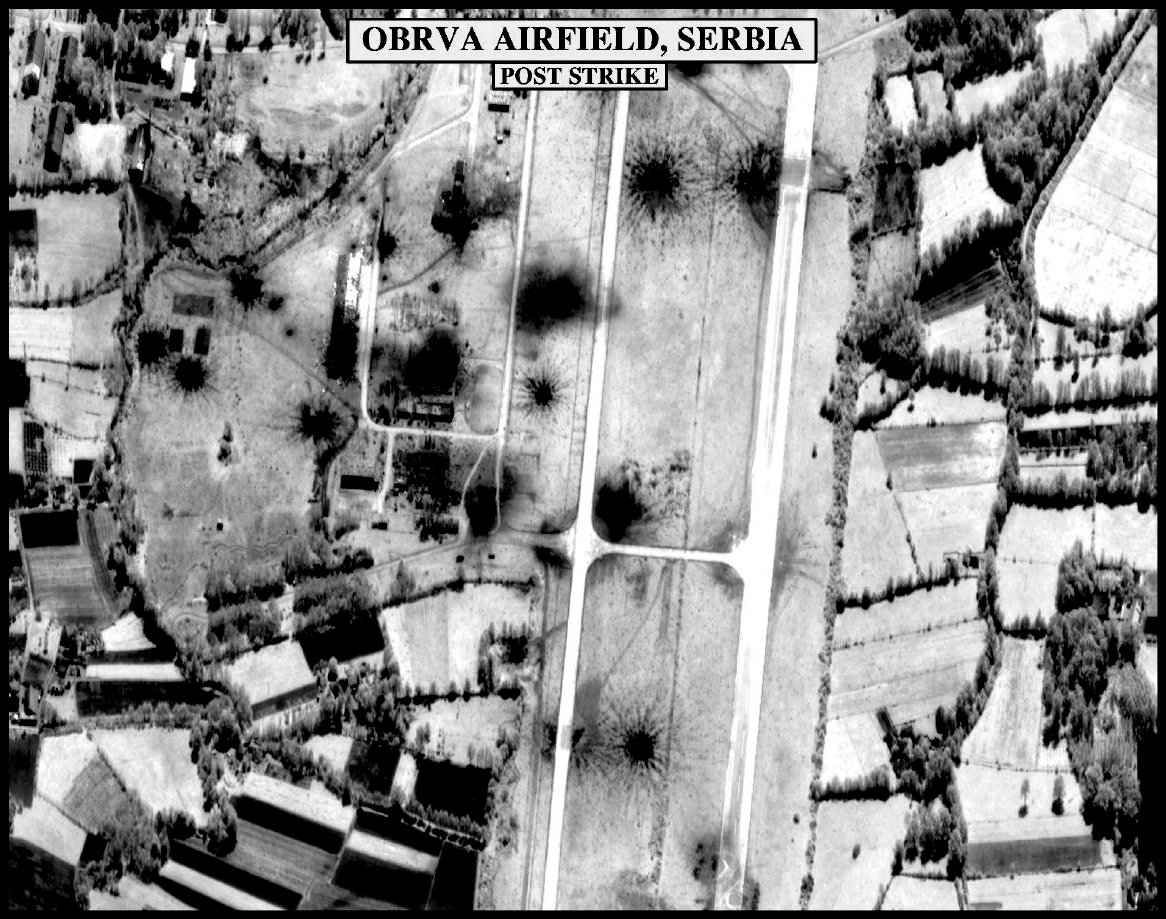
Aerial photograph of Lađevci Airfield after a NATO strike in 1999

After its construction in 1967, Lađevci Airbase, then often known as Obrva Airfield after the nearby village of Obrva, first hosted the 235th Fighter-Bomber Squadron of the Yugoslav Air Force. In 1992, due to the breakup of Yugoslavia, the airbase became more active when the 241st Fighter-Bomber Aviation Squadron, part of the 98th Fighter-Bomber Aviation Regiment equipped with J-22 Orao attack aircraft was fully transferred to Lađevci Air Base from their former home at the Skopski Petrovec Airbase in North Macedonia. From then on, the airport became home to several more units of the Air Force of Serbia and Montenegro, such as the 353rd Reconnaissance Aviation Squadron equipped with IJ-22 Orao reconnaissance aircraft and the 240th Fighter-Bomber Squadron from Mostar. During the 1999 NATO bombing of Yugoslavia, the airport and runway were badly damaged.

=== Civilian conversion efforts ===
Plans for converting the airbase to a civilian airport have been around since 2001, but it took until 2008 for the first step towards doing so to be taken, when plans were presented for the construction of a new control tower to replace the one destroyed in the NATO bombings in 1999.

On October 5, 2011, a Jat Airways ATR 72-202 carrying then-president Boris Tadić along with other government officials for a media briefing regarding the recovery effort from the 2010 Kraljevo earthquake touched down at Morava Airport, making it the first airliner to do so. Tadić toured the newly built control tower and the new terminal building, the construction of which had begun several months earlier.

In April 2012, Jat Airways announced plans to introduce regular flights between Kraljevo and Istanbul, with the terminal building expected to be fully completed in the coming months. According to EX-YU Aviation News, part of the Raška District, in which Kraljevo is located, has close historical ties with Turkey and a portion of the local population is expected to use this airport, instead of Pristina, for future flights to Istanbul. While the construction was completed on schedule, the service never materialised due to the airport's failure to obtain an operating license for the terminal on time.

Even though the operating license was eventually granted in 2013, the airport lay dormant until 2015 due to a lack of funds for a planned extension and widening of the runway after plans for a 10 million euro donation from the Turkish government fell through. In March of that year, Serbian tennis player Novak Đoković departed for the USA from Morava Airport in a specially organised flight with a stopover in Zurich to participate in the upcoming Indian Wells Open in California, and a few months later plans were floated for the Serbian government to enter into a public–private partnership with an unnamed German company which would serve Morava airport with ten planes flying to Frankfurt and Istanbul. This service, however, did not materialise either, and the opening of the airport was pushed to 2018. To that end, 2016 saw the founding of the state-owned company Airports of Serbia to manage Serbian civilian airport infrastructure, including Morava Airport. Low-cost carrier Wizz Air stated in 2017 it was "monitoring developments" at the airport; however, the airport runway was only capable of handling smaller turboprop aircraft, and no progress has been made towards its overhaul.

=== Civilian airport ===
Morava Airport officially opened on June 28, 2019, with prime minister of Serbia Ana Brnabić, President Aleksandar Vučić and Chairman of the Presidency of Bosnia and Herzegovina Milorad Dodik attending the ceremony. The Serbian government had announced that a larger plane, namely a Boeing 737, would land on opening day, but an Air Serbia twin-engine turboprop ATR 72 landed instead, carrying the dignitaries on a special flight. In November of that year, the airport was assigned the IATA code KVO, and Air Serbia won a PSO (public service obligation) tender to operate flights from the airport to Vienna year round and Thessaloniki seasonally as the sole bidder. The first commercial flight, to Vienna, took place on December 17, 2019 with an ATR-72. Then-transport minister Zorana Mihajlović had earlier that year stated that the airport's passenger count was expected to reach 20,000 by the end of 2019 and 100,000 by the end of 2020.

In 2021, the Ministry of Construction, Transport, and Infrastructure announced plans for a major expansion of Morava Airport. A large area of land required for the expansion was also expropriated from residents of the surrounding villages that year, such that the population of the nearby village of Obrva was expected to halve, with residents declaring compensation for the roughly 350 hectares of expropriated land to be inadequate to allow them to continue living there.

A new PSO tender in 2022, also won by Air Serbia as the only bidder, dropped the Vienna route, and subsidised a year-round service to Istanbul and seasonal service to Tivat in Montenegro instead. The exact same thing happened in 2023, too, this time with the contract valid until 2027.

In August of 2025, a chartered Boeing 737-300 belonging to Jordan Aviation brought the members of Saudi Arabian basketball club Al-Ula to the airport for training in Zlatibor, marking the first time an aircraft of that size has landed at Morava airport.

== Lađevci Air Base ==
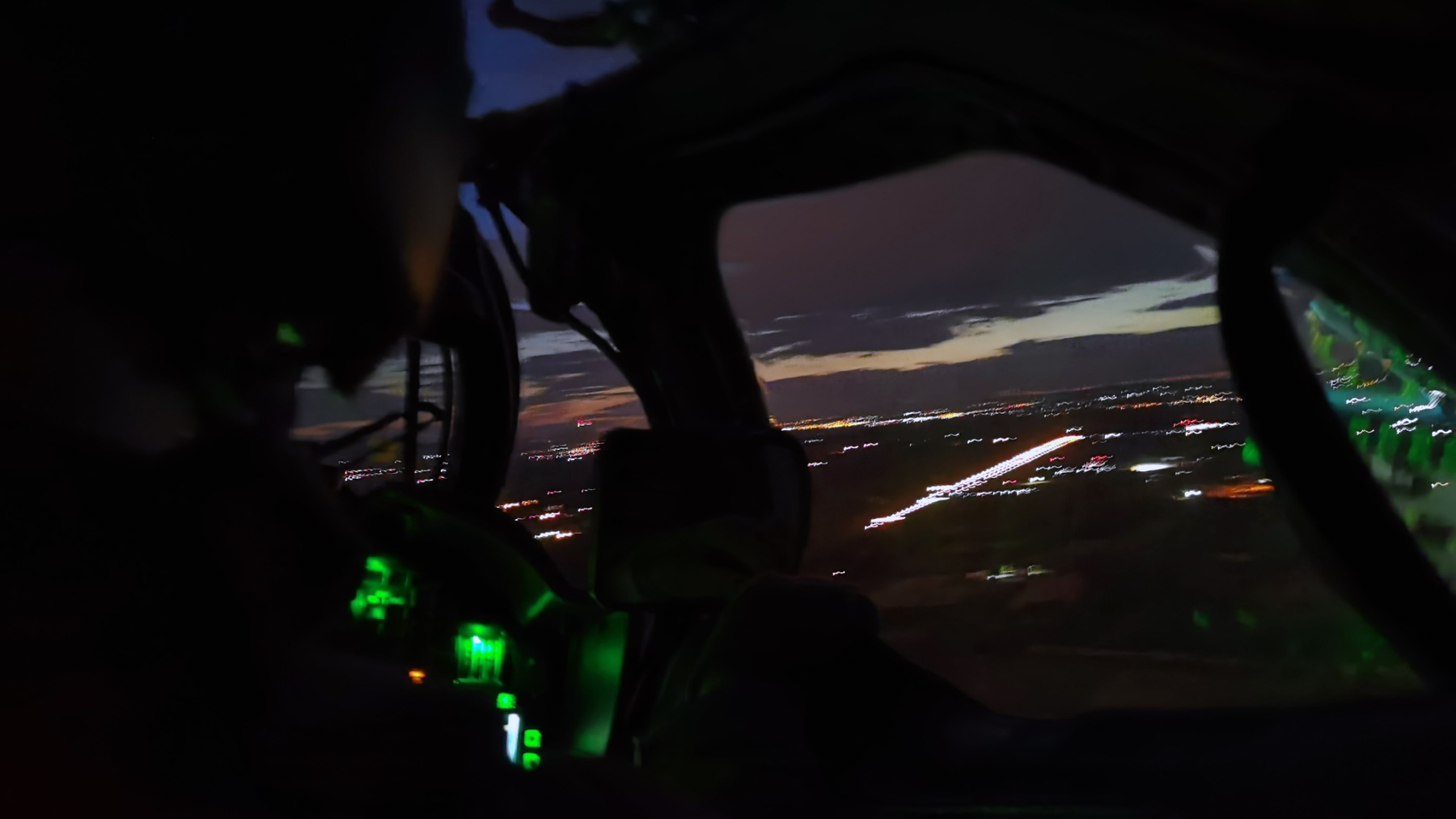
View from the inside of a Mi-35 helicopter approaching Lađevci Air Base

The Lađevci Air Base (Serbian: Војни аеродром Лађевци/Vojni aerodrom Lađevci) is located at the airport. Operated by the Serbian Air Force and Air Defence, the base is home to most units of the 98th Air Brigade, such as the 241st Fighter-Bomber Squadron "Tigers", 714th Anti-armor Helicopter Squadron "Shadows", and 353rd Reconnaissance Squadron "Hawks". The 98th Air Brigade also includes the 98th Air Defence Artillery Missile Battalion, 98th Air Technical Battalion and 98th Airfield Security Battalion. The airbase is equipped with a 2,900 m^{2} (31,000 sq ft) hangar.

== Reception ==
The reception of Morava Airport from government officials has been overwhelmingly positive. In 2020, then-minister of transport Zorana Mihajlović declared the airport of "great importance" to central Serbia, and in a 2024 interview the mayor of Kraljevo Predrag Terzić stated "Morava Airport is exemplary this season – no queues, delays, ticket prices are affordable. For anyone who lives in central or western Serbia, not having to go to Belgrade to travel to the Montenegrin or Greek coast is a boon." During the airport's 2019 opening ceremony, President Vučić commented that the airport has "turned myth into modern reality" and that "the future of Serbia is in airports, roads, railways and factories".

The airport has also been heavily criticised. Croatian aviation analyst Alen Šćuric has called it "the largest fiasco in the history of the region" and "megastupid". Serbian weekly news magazine NIN wrote it off as "closer to a governmental failure [..] than a promising investment". These criticisms focus on the discrepancy between the large amount of money invested in the airport (according to some calculations, upwards of 40 million euros, with opposition politician Miroslav Aleksić putting the figure as high as "hundreds of millions") and the perceived underperformance of the airport. Šćuric also pointed to alleged inefficiencies in the airport operations claiming that Morava employed significantly more people than other similarly-sized airports.

== Airlines and destinations ==
The following airlines operate regular scheduled and seasonal flights from Morava:

Airlines	Destinations	Refs.
Air Serbia	Istanbul; Seasonal: Thessaloniki, Tivat	

== Statistics ==
Passenger and aircraft movement statistics (2019–2026)

Year	Passengers	Change	Aircraft movements	Change
2019	529	Steady	38	Steady
2020	1,038	▲96.2%	178	▲368.4%
2021	1,488	▲43.3%	200	▲12.4%
2022	13,683	▲819.6%	580	▲190.0%
2023	13,862	▲1.3%	620	▲6.9%
2024	13,781	▼0.6%	602	▼2.9%
2025	14,713	▲6.8%	598	▼0.7%
2026 (1.1.-31.3.)	12,826	▼0.7%	500	▲2.5%

== See also ==
- List of airports in Serbia
- Transport in Serbia
