= Pegaz =

Serbian UCAV

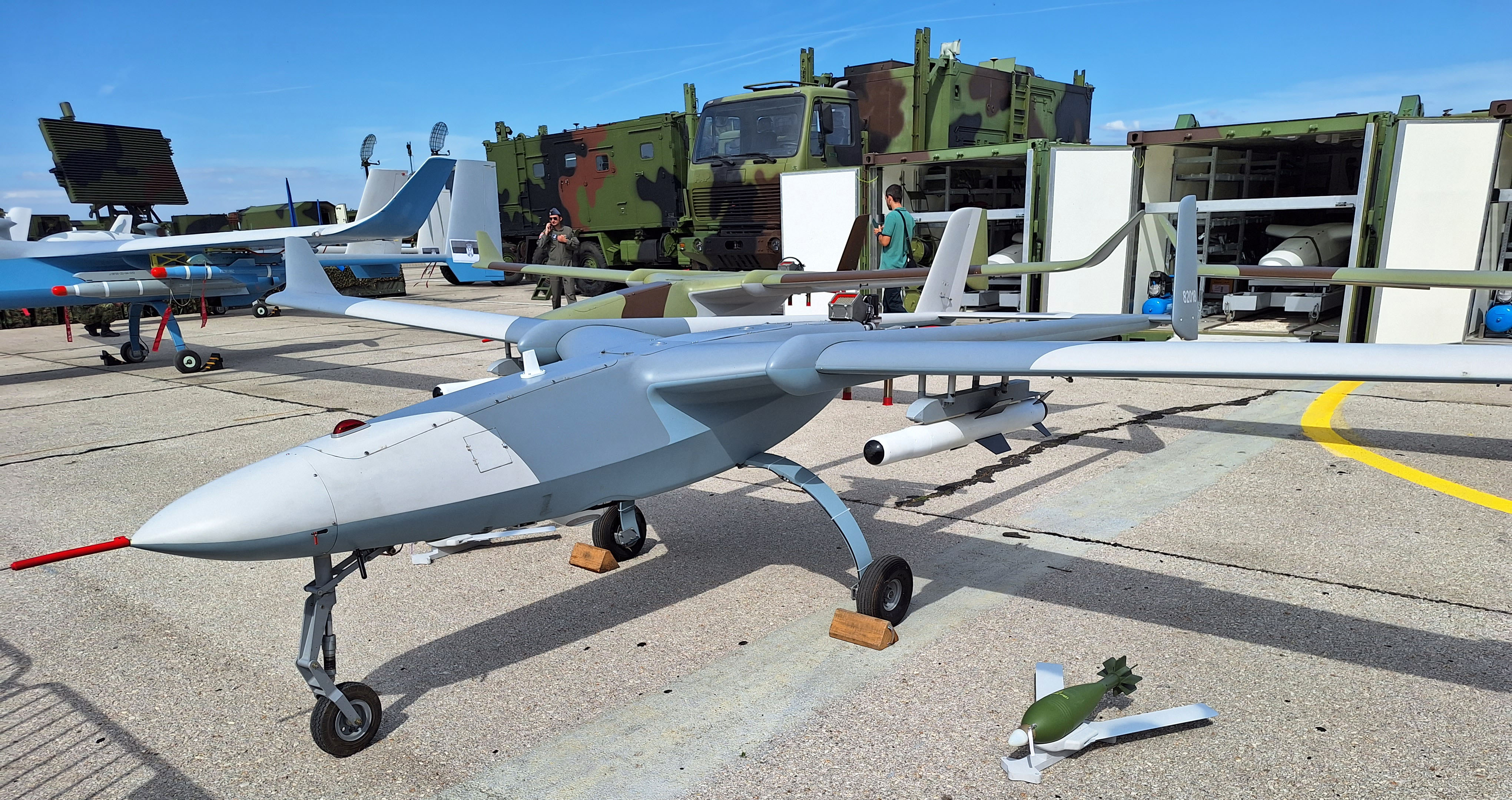
- Pegaz of the Serbian Air Force in 2024

General information
- Type: Unmanned combat aerial vehicle
- National origin: Serbia
- Manufacturer: Utva Aviation Industry
- Designer: Military Technical Institute
- Status: In service
- Primary user: Serbian Air Force and Air Defence
- Number built: 12+

History
- Manufactured: 2011–present
- Introduction date: 2025
- First flight: 2011

The Pegaz is a Serbian-produced unmanned combat aerial vehicle, developed by the Military Technical Institute and manufactured by the Utva Aviation Industry.

== History ==
Pegaz premiered at the 2011 Partner (international weapons trade fair) and entered service in the Serbian Air Force and Air Defence in 2025.

== Specifications ==
General characteristics

- Capacity: 50 kg (110 lb) payload
- Length: 5.395 m (17 ft 8 in)
- Wingspan: 7.025 m (23 ft 1 in)
- Height: 1.6 m (5 ft 3 in)
- Wing area: 4.24 m^{2} (45.6 sq ft)
- Empty weight: 120 kg (265 lb)
- Max takeoff weight: 245 kg (540 lb)
- Propellers: 2-bladed pusher propeller

Performance

- Maximum speed: 160–180 km/h (99–112 mph, 86–97 kn)
- Cruise speed: 130–150 km/h (81–93 mph, 70–81 kn)
- Range: 250 km (160 mi, 130 nmi) exact maximum range is yet unknown
- Endurance: 6 to 10 hours
- Service ceiling: 6,000 m (20,000 ft)

Armament

- Rockets: 2 × FT-8D laser guided rocket

Avionics

- Automatic takeoff from prepared runway (optional: catapult)
- Automatic landing on prepared runway (emergency: parachute)
- Fully autonomous way points tracking, holding, camera guiding Emergency and return home mode Altitude and velocity autopilot

== Operators ==
- Serbia
  - Serbian Air Force and Air Defence
    - 353rd Reconnaissance Squadron

== See also ==
- High Speed Target Drone
- IAI Scout
- AAI RQ-2 Pioneer
- AAI RQ-7 Shadow
- IAI Searcher
- Tadiran Mastiff
- SELEX Galileo Falco
- Watchkeeper WK450
- SAGEM Sperwer
