= Atlas Carver =

Proposed South African Air Force jet fighter

General information
- Type: Fighter aircraft
- National origin: South Africa
- Manufacturer: Atlas Aircraft Corporation
- Status: Cancelled
- Primary user: South African Air Force (proposed)
- Number built: None; 1 prototype unfinished

History
- Developed from: Atlas Cheetah

The Atlas Carver (sometimes erroneously referred to as "CAVA") was a proposed South African twin-engine, delta wing fourth-generation fighter aircraft. In development during the 1980s and early 1990s, the Carver was ultimately cancelled during 1991.

The South African Border War played a considerable role in stimulating the demand for the production of a modern fighter aircraft with which to equip the South African Air Force (SAAF) in the face of increasingly capable opposition. Additionally, South Africa was incapable of importing such aircraft due to a long-standing arms embargo having been placed upon the nation's government bodies by United Nations Security Council Resolution 418. The South African government decided to launch a pair of domestically conducted programmes, a short-term upgrade programme of the existing fleet of French-built Dassault Mirage III fighters, which became known as the Atlas Cheetah, while a long-term and more extensive effort to design and manufacture a virtually-clean sheet fighter aircraft, known as Project Carver. Both programmes were headed by South African firm Atlas Aircraft Corporation.

As envisioned, Carver was intended to be a modern and capable successor aircraft to replace multiple, ageing types then in service with the SAAF, such as the British-built Blackburn Buccaneer, French-built Mirage IIIs, and the Atlas Cheetahs. A key objective for the new fighter was to achieve performance levels that were either equal to or in excess of the capabilities of late-generation Soviet fighters, which were increasingly likely to be deployed to neighbouring states, specifically Angola. Externally, the Carver bore some resemblance to the Dassault Mirage 4000 prototype; the design drew upon several elements of Dassault Aviation's Mirage family, including the decision to incorporate a number of Snecma engine components which were produced under licence in South Africa. While being a heavily indigenous effort, partially due to the embargo, South Africa was able to acquire substantial assistance on Project Carver from both France and Israel; many aerospace engineers and designers were hired from these nations, while technical information related to Israel's aborted IAI Lavi programme was also acquired under the Israel–South Africa Agreement. During February 1991, the cancellation of Project Carver was announced by South African President F. W. de Klerk, who stated that the programme's research and development costs were too great to justify during peacetime. In its place, the government preferred acquisition of foreign aircraft which had become possible again after the lifting of the international arms embargo against South Africa; ultimately, the Swedish-built Saab JAS 39 Gripen fighter was procured to equip the SAAF with instead.

== Development ==
=== Background ===
Throughout much of the 1970s and 1980s, the development of South Africa's military equipment, including the assets of the South African Air Force (SAAF), became increasingly influenced by the changes in fortune and demands imposed by the lengthy South African Border War. Having originally been started as a limited-scale counter-insurgency campaign, it progressively escalated into a larger conflict that was being waged across areas of both South-West Africa (modern-day Namibia) and southern Angola against militants of the Communist-leaning South-West African People's Organisation (SWAPO). As South African forces came to frequently launch raids into neighbouring Angola, these attacks often provoked armed clashes with the members of the People's Armed Forces of Liberation of Angola (FAPLA), which was at that time bolstered by the provision of Soviet armaments alongside a sizeable contingent of Cuban troops dispatched to intervene in the theatre. During November 1985, FAPLA began acquiring more sophisticated combat aircraft and radar installations; gradually, the addition of these improved assets enabled air superiority over southern Angola to be seized from South Africa's expeditionary forces, rendering offensive operations more risky to conduct and increasingly the likelihood of losses.

In response to the changing situation in Angola, South Africa sought to regain air superiority in the theatre by enacting several improvements of its own. As a short-term measure, it was decided to upgrade the majority of the SAAF's existing Dassault Mirage III fighter aircraft, equipping them with a range of new armaments, equipment, and avionics which were designed to allow the aircraft to operate while being less vulnerable to both Soviet-designed missiles and radar. However, these modified Mirages, which were known as Atlas Cheetahs, were considered only an interim solution until an entirely new multirole fighter could be deployed. As a consequence of the imposing of a mandatory arms embargo upon the South African government by United Nations Security Council Resolution 418, the means of acquiring such combat aircraft were limited; any new aircraft, along with its associated systems and support equipment, would either have to be sourced domestically or assembled using components that had been imported or licensed prior to the enactment of the embargo.

=== Project launch ===
Accordingly, South Africa embarked on a comprehensive development programme to design and eventually manufacture an envisioned modern-generation fighter aircraft to meet its requirement; this programme soon received the codename of Project Carver. The programme was organised as a joint-effort between the SAAF, Armscor subsidiary Atlas Aircraft Corporation and the National Research Laboratory. The objective of the programme was the replacement of all multirole fighters then in service with the SAAF from the mid-1990s onwards. The associated development costs were high, partially as a result of the effects of the arms embargo, which necessitated the development of all the new technology within South Africa. At that point in time, the country's aerospace industry lacked any prior experience with the production of anything more intricate than various models of helicopters and light trainer aircraft; thus, it was decided to recruit large numbers of foreign aircraft engineers from around the world, including some French nationals who had previously spearheaded design work on France's then-new fighter aircraft, the Dassault Mirage 2000.

Project Carver also received extensive support from the government of Israel. This assistance was provided in various forms, such as technical assistance and hundreds of skilled experts from Israel's cancelled IAI Lavi domestic fighter programme. Reportedly, various incentives were offered by Atlas to Israeli engineers, including starting salaries of US$7,000 per month paid in any currency, free accommodation and regular free or heavily discounted flights to Israel, to encourage them to join Project Carver. Overall, it was estimated that the programme would require in excess of 4,000 engineers at the peak of the development phase, which was scheduled to run for roughly six years.

Headed by ex-Dassault Aviation designer David Fabish, work commenced on the initial design phase, during which various concepts were explored for the aircraft. By 1986, Atlas had selected a design for a lightweight single-engined aircraft, being 16 metres (52 ft) in length and possessing a wingspan of roughly 9 metres (30 ft), a single vertical stabiliser and a mid-mounted delta wing furnished with leading-edge root extensions (LERX) set above side-mounted curved air intakes for the engine. The concept called for composite materials to be used throughout the airframe, for reducing both the weight and the radar cross-section of the aircraft. Additionally, it was planned to able to utilise all of the weapons then in SAAF's arsenal or in development at that time; these munitions included the H-2 guided bomb, V3C and U-Darter short-range guided missiles and the then-planned R-Darter beyond visual range (BVR) air-to-air missile; the total payload capacity was intended to have been comparable to that of the Mirage 2000.

=== Delays and design switch ===
The Carver programme was beset by numerous delays, often resulting from changes to the aircraft's tactical requirements, as well as the necessity to design the aircraft around a preexisting engine type, namely the Snecma Atar 09K50; along with other design requirements, such as the need to equal the Buccaneer in terms of both range and load-carrying capability. Recognising the age of the Atar engine, South Africa made several covert attempts to acquire more modern jet engines, such as the Snecma M53 (which powered the Dassault Mirage 2000) and Snecma M88s (as used by the then-upcoming Dassault Rafale and the planned Yugoslavian Novi Avion), but such efforts were ultimately fruitless. At the same time, efforts were made to improve the engine via several domestically developed modifications aiming to increase its performance and reliability, such as the turbine being refitted with single-crystal blades and the riveted compressor being replaced by a welded counterpart, which reportedly boosted the engine's performance by 10 per cent and improved throttle management.

During early development, it became clear to the designers that the desired range and load-carrying capacities would be unachievable if the aircraft was powered by a single Atar engine. Consequently, they decided to adopt a twin-engine layout for the proposed fighter instead; the decision to abandon the initially selected single-engine format in favour of the twin-engine approach reportedly threw the project into chaos for some time. The change resulted in a delay of at least two years, the adoption of a twin-engine layout necessitated a larger and heavier airframe to be used along with more complex systems; essentially, the design team had to return to the drawing board. During 1988, the SAAF, having recognised that the project could no longer be ready within the original schedule, decided to approved a further interim programme, known as Project Tunny, to satisfy the nation's immediate air defence needs into the 2008–2012 period; this resulted in an improved version of the Atlas Cheetah, the Cheetah C, being produced from 1993 to 1994.

During 1988, Atlas commenced the construction of a single Carver prototype; according to reports, this aircraft was never fully completed and no test flights were known to have taken place. During mid-1989, aerospace publication Flight International reported that the in-development fighter aircraft was intended to be inducted into SAAF service within the latter half of the 1990s, and would be used to replace various types then in use, such as the French-built Mirage III fighters, British-built Blackburn Buccaneer and English Electric Canberra bombers, before eventually replacing the comparatively newer Dassault Mirage F1 fleet as well. In terms of its basic configuration, Carver resembled a delta wing layout; reportedly, the design had been externally influenced by Dassault's family of delta-winged Mirage fighters; specifically, the aircraft bore a large number of similarities to its Atlas Cheetah predecessor as well as to the Dassault Mirage 4000 prototype fighter.

=== Termination ===
The Angolan Tripartite Accord and the end of the South African Border War represented a major loss of impetus for Project Carver. During February 1991, President F. W. de Klerk formally announced the programme's cancellation. The principal official reason given at the time for the cancellation was that the expense of developing an indigenous fighter aircraft could not be justified in the light of the decreased threat in the newfound peacetime, changes in politics including the movement away from apartheid, and the gradual normalisation of international relationships. Recognising that new aircraft were still required, the South African government set about examining options for the procurement of an off-the-shelf fighter aircraft (which had been made possible due to the embargo having been lifted) in order to replace the SAAF's inventory of Dassault Mirage F1s and Atlas Cheetahs.

== See also ==
- FMA SAIA 90
- IAR 95
- Novi Avion
- PZL-230 Skorpion
- ALR Piranha

Related development

- Atlas Cheetah
- Dassault Mirage III
- Dassault Mirage 2000
- Dassault Mirage 4000
- IAI Lavi
