= Novi Avion =

Yugoslav cancelled multirole fighter project

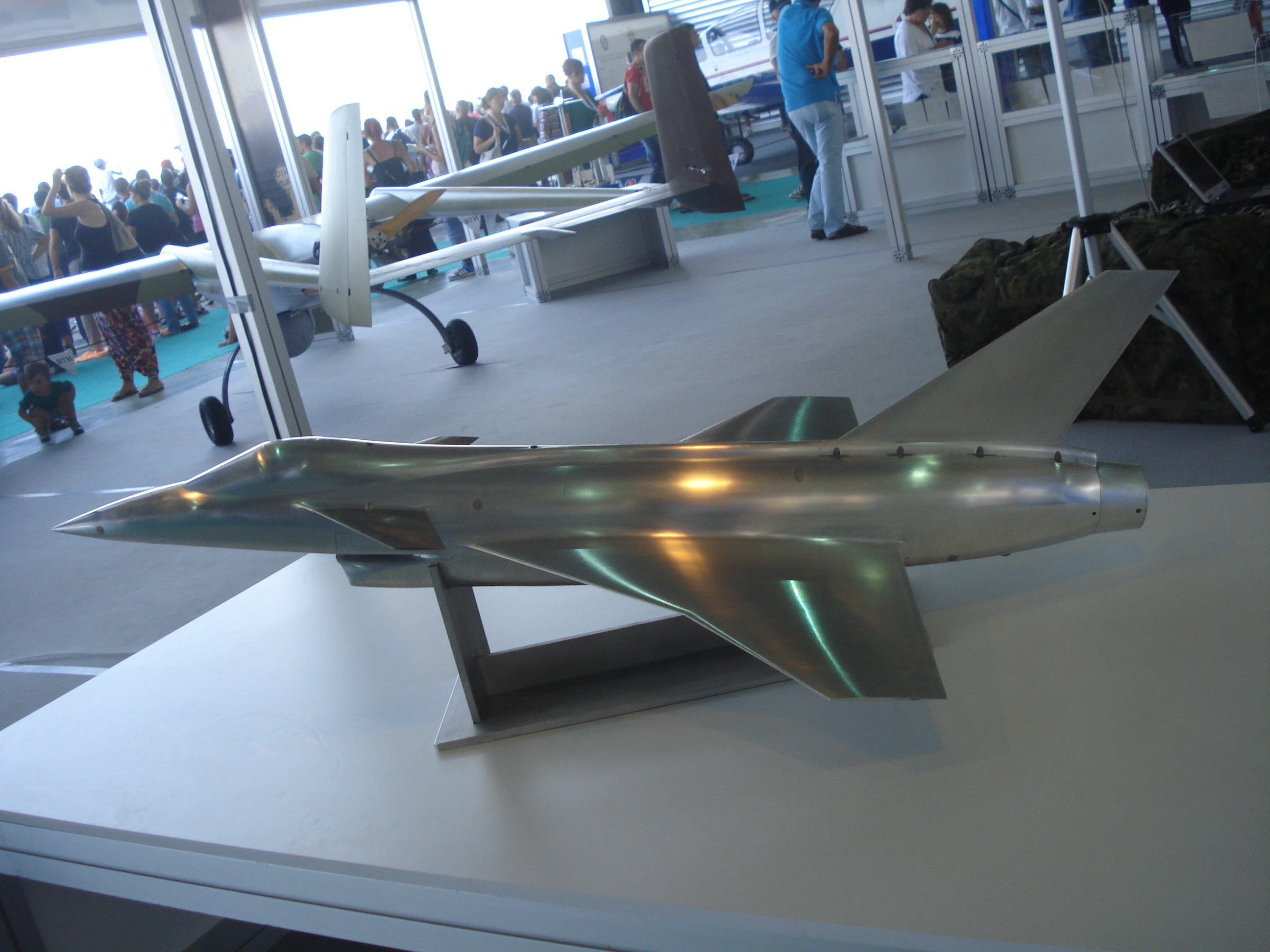

General information
- Type: Multi-role combat aircraft
- National origin: Yugoslavia
- Manufacturer: SOKO
- Designer: Aerotechnical Institute
- Status: Cancelled in 1991
- Primary user: Yugoslav Air Force (intended)

History
- First flight: Planned for 1992

The Novi Avion (Serbian Cyrillic: Нови Aвион English: New Aeroplane) was a fourth generation multi-role combat aircraft programme that was to be built by Yugoslav aircraft manufacturer SOKO.

The Avion featured a cropped delta-canard configuration and was to be capable of achieving supersonic speeds under a combat configuration. The Avion shared several areas of commonality with French company Dassault Aviation's Rafale fighter aircraft; France had provided considerable technical assistance to Yugoslavia during the course of the Avion programme. Development work on the fighter was undertaken by the Vazduhoplovno Tehnički Institut (VTI) (Aeronautical Technical Institute) of Belgrade, the former Yugoslavia's main military-technical institute, in cooperation with Dassault Aviation.

Upon its entry to service with the Yugoslav Air Force, which was anticipated to occur during the late 1990s to early 2000s, the Avion would have been used as a replacement for the nation's aging fleet of Mikoyan-Gurevich MiG-21s. The nation also anticipated considerable exports sales of the type. During 1991, the entire programme was halted due to a lack of available finance just prior to the commencement of production and a year prior to the scheduled date of the type's envisioned maiden flight. The Avion was terminated as a consequence of the outbreak of the Yugoslav Wars and the subsequent break-up of the country.

== Overview ==
=== Background ===
During the mid-1980s, the Avion programme was initiated with the aim of increasing Yugoslavia's political independence by becoming self-sufficient in the manufacture of military equipment; at that point, air superiority fighter jets were the only major element that Yugoslavia was still reliant upon imports, having obtained the capability to manufacture all other military equipment.

The Avion was intended to be used as a replacement for the Yugoslavian Air Force's fleet of around 120 Mikoyan-Gurevich MiG-21s. In service, the aircraft was envisioned as fulfilling multiple mission roles, including air-defence, ground-attack and aerial reconnaissance, being designed to possess both high manoeuvrability and supersonic penetration speeds. The aircraft was a recognised priority programme for the Yugoslavian People's Army and was partly funded by the national government out of general research and development and modernisation funds, as well as being partly provided by industry. In addition to the MiG-21s, by 1990s, the Yugoslavian Air Force operated a force of 14 Mikoyan MiG-29 Fulcrum A fighters, while it had also been claimed to have selected the Sukhoi Su-25 Frogfoot to be procured as its dedicated close air support aircraft. In addition, the Yugoslavian Air Force was expected to place further orders for the MiG-29 during the 1990s, which were reportedly intended to bolster the remaining MiG-21 fleet until the Avion could be inducted into squadron service.

Both France and French company Dassault Aviation's upcoming Rafale fighter bore a heavy influence on the design of the Avion. The Novi Avion was to be Yugoslavia's first supersonic aircraft, accordingly, the national industry lacked experience in the design and testing of such fighters and sought out external partners to provide assistance. During the late 1980s, a preliminary design study, heavily influenced by the Rafale, had been submitted by Dassault. The Avion shared several areas of commonality with the Rafale, such as an almost-identical delta-canard configuration and a similar engine intake arrangement. It has been claimed that the addition of strakes extending aft from the trailing edge of the wing was to account for the single engine arrangement adopted for the type. According to aerospace publication Flight International, the majority of design differences between the Rafale and the Avion were due to the smaller size of the latter, especially in terms of its tail section.

=== Search for partners and termination ===
By March 1990, the selection of an engine to power the Avion was reportedly imminent. It was claimed that engine proposals had been received from several major international manufacturers, including General Electric's F404, Rolls-Royce's RB199, Pratt & Whitney's PW1120 and Snecma's M88 turbofan military-grade engines, which were reportedly amongst options under study by Yugoslavia. Potential engine arrangements may have included a licensing arrangement to produce the selected engine in Yugoslavia. During the 1990s, the development costs related to the fighter had been reportedly anticipated to be between $US150 million and $US200 million per year throughout the remainder of the decade. At one stage, Yugoslavia expected to construct approximately 150 of these planes to replace both its MiG-21 and Soko J-21 Jastreb fleets, while export sales of several hundred Novi Avions on the world market had also been anticipated by the country.

By early 1990, the government of Yugoslavia had conducted several discussions with various countries, aiming to open up negotiations to jointly develop the fledgling fighter aircraft. While the nation had already announced that, in principle, it would proceed with production of the Avion, it sought outside partners to share the aircraft's considerable development cost. However, these aspirations for extensive multinational collaboration were often complicated by political factors, which were typically dominated by scepticism. During 1990, Flight International wrote of Yugoslavia's partnership efforts: "For this to become a realistic hope, let alone a possibility, will require political change beyond anything already seen in Eastern Europe. Western companies wanting to work with Jugoslavia on Novi Avion had been warned by their governments to exercise care lest technology end up in the wrong hands".

During 1991, Yugoslavia disintegrated into several nations, which quickly resulted in the Avion programme being abandoned due to the financial resources necessary to start production of the fighter having become unavailable following the break-up of the country. Reportedly, work had been initially halted due to the lack of funding while further efforts were made to acquire foreign partnership arrangements. Following the outbreak of the Yugoslav Wars, resulting in the complete collapse of the nation, any revival of the project henceforth became highly unlikely. At the time of the Avion's cancellation, the design was approximately one year away from completion; at this point, several production facilities and prototypes of some elements of the aircraft such as its cockpit, had already been constructed. If the fighter had not been cancelled, it was scheduled to have made its maiden flight during 1992; the Avion was reportedly expected to enter squadron service during the mid 2000s.

== Design ==
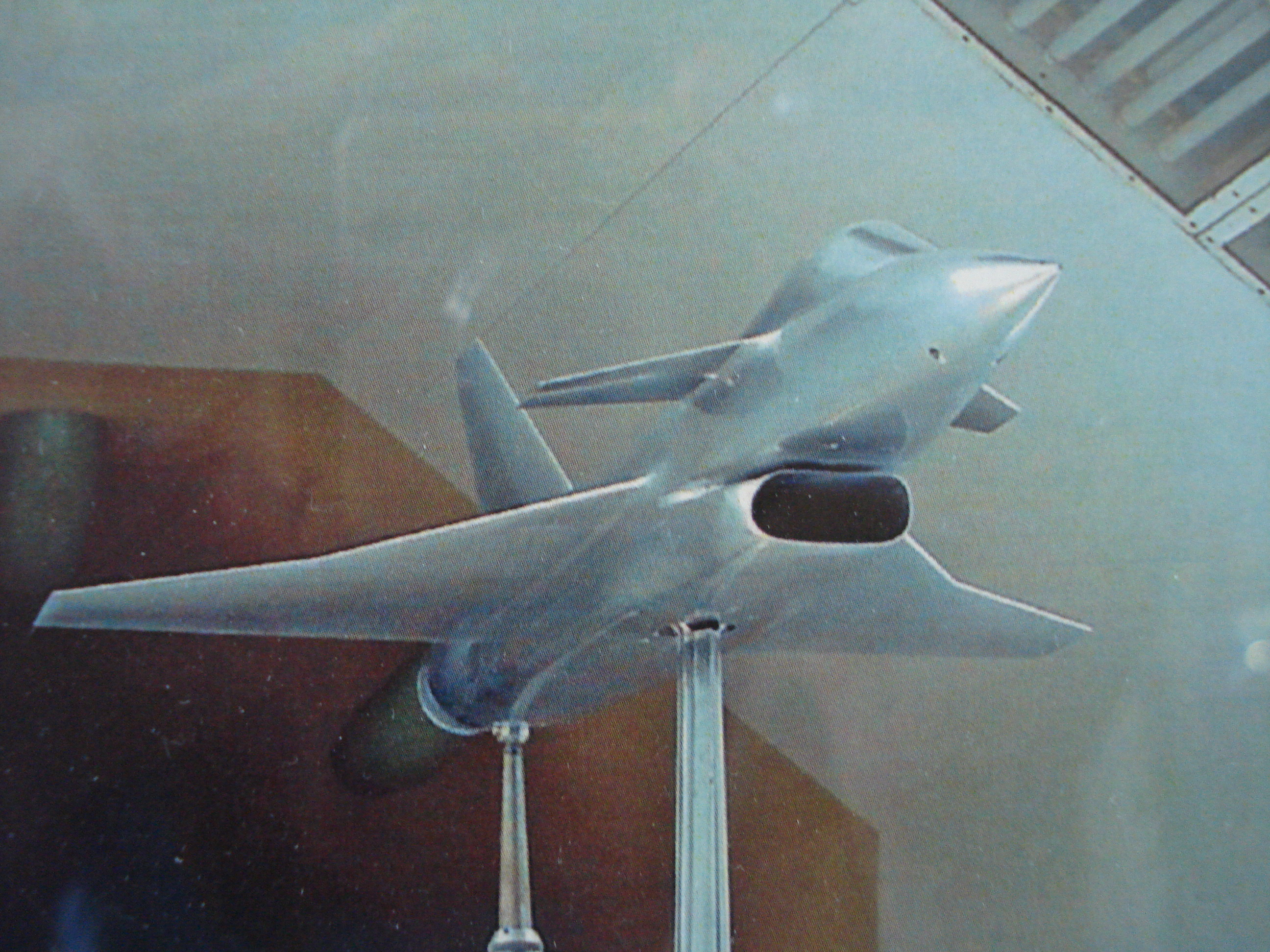
A scale model of the Novi Avion

The Novi Avion was a fourth generation multi-role combat aircraft. In terms of its basic layout, it featured a cropped delta-canard configuration. Externally, the Avion resembled the French-built Dassault Rafale, although it differed by being both smaller and only powered by a single engine. It was designed to fill a variety of different roles, including air superiority, interception, reconnaissance, ground attack, and anti-shipping operations. According to statements by senior Yugoslavian Air Force officials, the design involved the extensive use of composite materials, which were to comprise a large proportion of the structure. It was to be furnished with various advanced systems, such as integrated navigation/attack systems and a multi-purpose radar system.

The Avion was to incorporate a number of features that were intended to lower its radar cross-section (RCS), although this would not have been to the extent of being a true stealth aircraft. It was intended to be equipped with an advanced Electronic countermeasures (ECM)/Electronic counter-counter-measures (ECCM) suite, which was to be domestically developed in Yugoslavia. The cockpit was also relatively advanced for the time, integration features such as a speaker recognition capability. The Avion was often claimed to be an all-Yugoslav design, and was not based on any foreign fighter aircraft; however, France provided considerable technical assistance in designing many of the most complex components and elements of the aircraft that Yugoslavia lacked experience with, such as the Avion's multipurpose radar system.

No engine had been selected to power the Avion prior to the 1991 design freeze; however, according to Flight International, the two most likely candidates were the American General Electric F404, and the French Snecma M88 turbofan engines, the latter of which being the same engine that was later used to power the Dassault Rafale. In addition, the majority of the armaments that the fighter would have carried in service were likely have been either French-designed weapons, or would have been domestically manufactured with assistance provided by France. The design requirements for the fighter were thought to have included a thrust-to-weight ratio in excess of 1:1. The fighter's anticipated maximum speed at sea level was to be no less than Mach 1.1, while its top speed when flown at an altitude 36,000 ft (11,000m) was to have been in the vicinity of Mach 1.8.

== Specifications ==
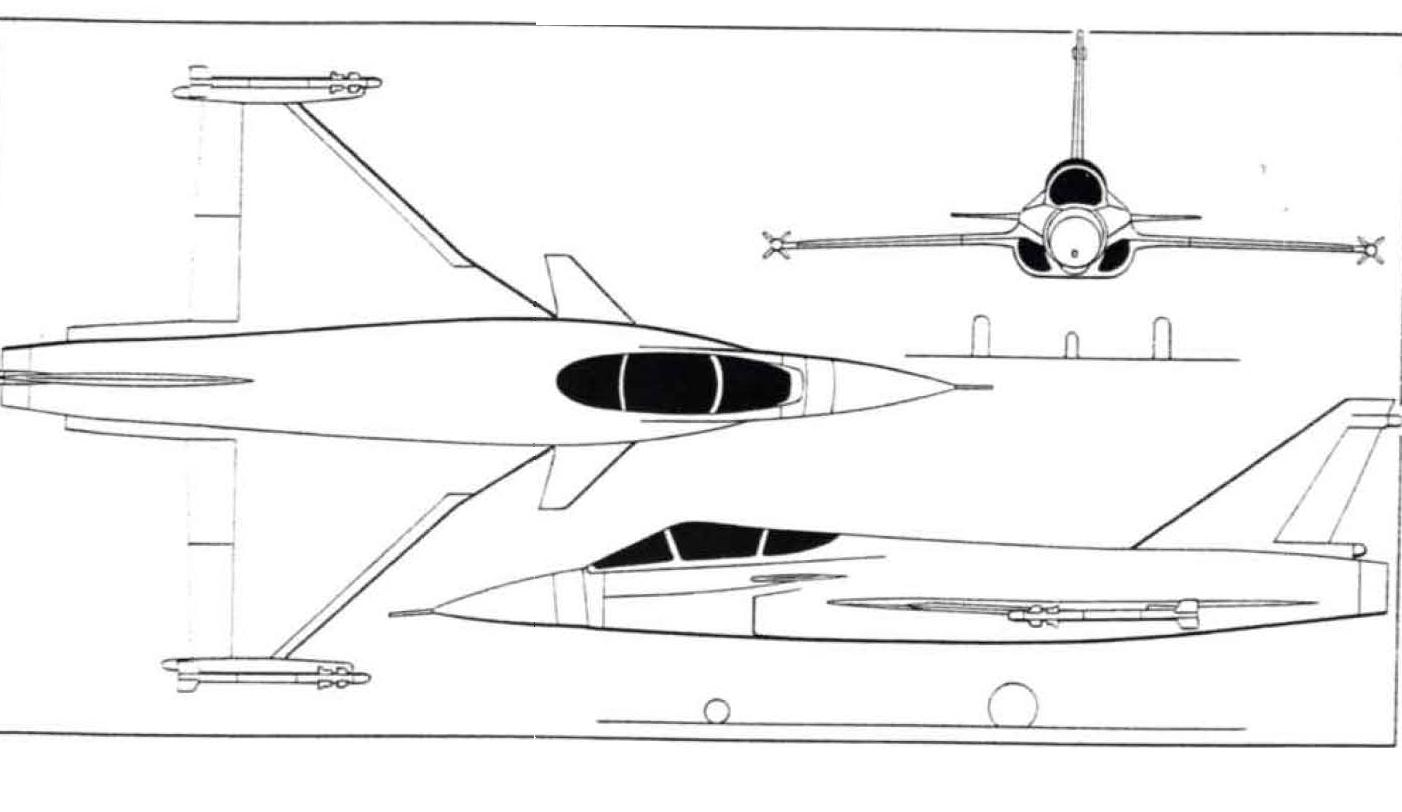
Orthographically projected diagram of the Novi Avion

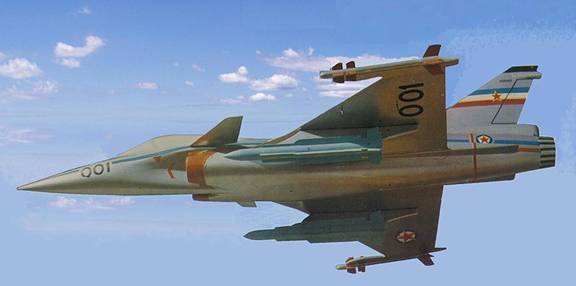
Artist's depiction of an armed Novi Avion in flight

Data from

General characteristics

- Crew: 1
- Length: 13.75 m (45 ft 1 in)
- Wingspan: 8 m (26 ft 3 in)
- Height: 4.87 m (16 ft 0 in)
- Wing area: 30 m^{2} (320 sq ft)
- Empty weight: 6,247 kg (13,772 lb)
- Max takeoff weight: 13,400 kg (29,542 lb)
- Powerplant: 1 × Snecma M88 afterburning turbofan, 50.04 kN (11,250 lbf) thrust dry, 75.62 kN (17,000 lbf) with afterburner

Performance

- Maximum speed: 2,000 km/h (1,200 mph, 1,100 kn)
- Maximum speed: Mach 1.88
- Range: 3,765 km (2,339 mi, 2,033 nmi)
- Service ceiling: 17,000 m (56,000 ft)
- Rate of climb: 275 m/s (54,100 ft/min)
- Wing loading: 446.67 kg/m^{2} (91.49 lb/sq ft)

Armament

- Guns: 1× 30 mm cannon
- Hardpoints: 11 total (including 2× wing-tip hardpoints for infra-red homing air-to-air missiles)

Avionics

- Fire-control radar
- Digital flight control system
- Multi-function navigation/attack system
- Glass cockpit

== See also ==
- Atlas Carver
- Chengdu J-10
- Dassault Rafale
- Eurofighter Typhoon
- IAI Lavi
- Saab JAS 39 Gripen
- FMA SAIA 90
- IAR 95

Related lists

- List of fighter aircraft
