= Dassault Mirage 4000 =

French multirole fighter

Mirage 4000
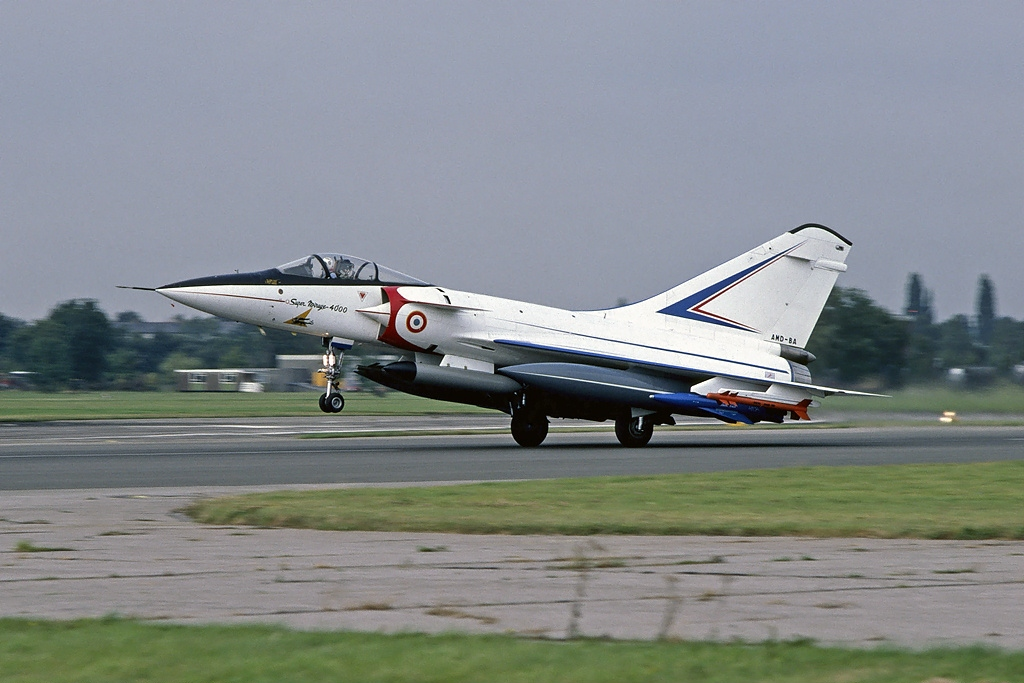
- Mirage 4000 prototype

General information
- Type: Prototype fighter aircraft
- National origin: France
- Manufacturer: Dassault-Breguet
- Status: Program cancelled in 1988
- Primary user: French Air Force (intended)
- Number built: 1

History
- First flight: 9 March 1979
- Developed from: Dassault Mirage 2000

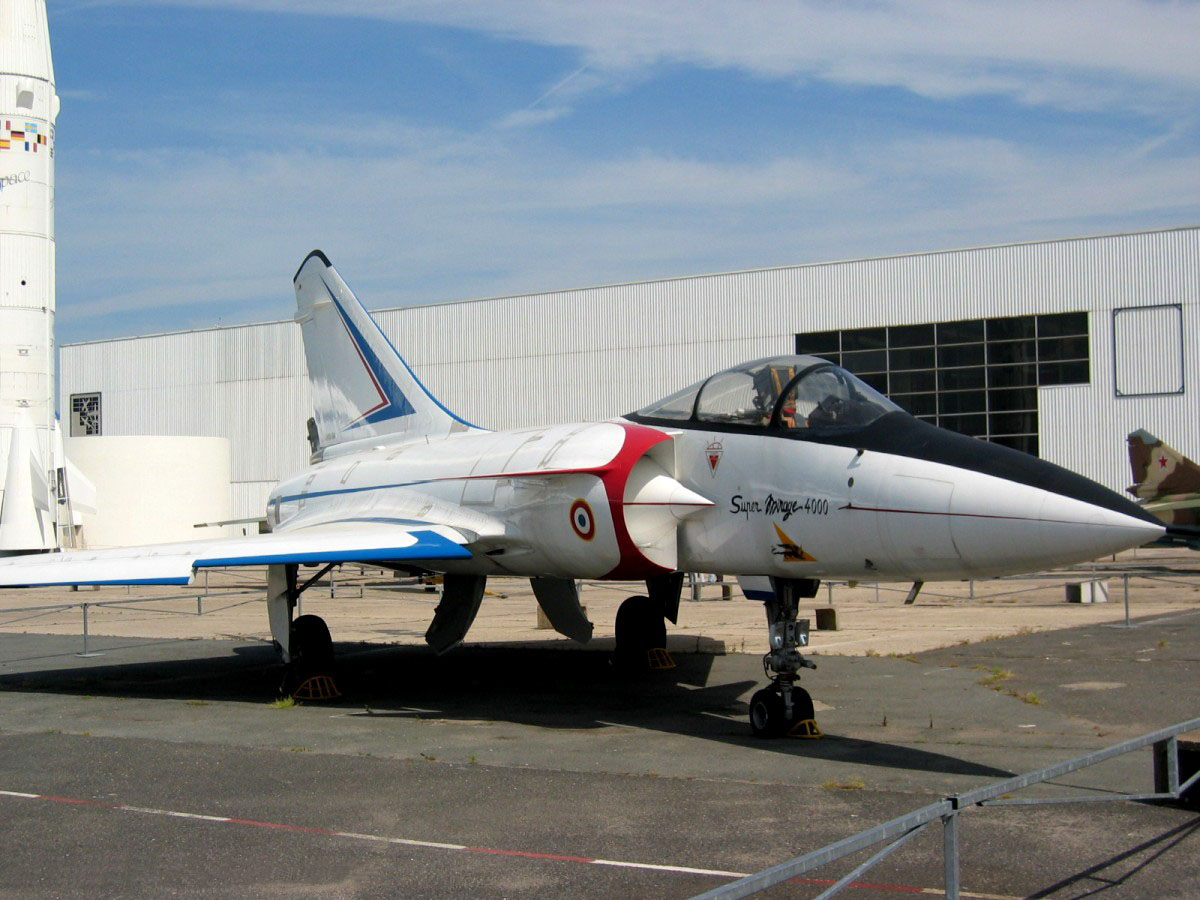
Mirage 4000 prototype displayed at the Musée de l'Air et de l'Espace at Le Bourget, France

The Dassault Mirage 4000 (sometimes called the Super Mirage 4000) is a French prototype twinjet fighter aircraft developed by Dassault-Breguet from their Mirage 2000.

== Design and development ==
The Mirage 4000 was noticeably larger and heavier than the single-engined Mirage 2000, the 4000 having two SNECMA M53-2 turbofans. It also featured small canards above the engine air intakes and a true bubble canopy, compared to the Mirage 2000 and previous Mirages. Despite the changes, the two aircraft remained similar, sharing the delta wing design, semi-conical Oswatitsch-type air intakes, and general configuration.

The Mirage 4000 first flew on 9 March 1979. It was financed as a private venture by Dassault. The Mirage 4000 was comparable in size to the United States F-15 Eagle, and was designed to be both a long-range interceptor and a fighter-bomber.

In the early 1980s, Dassault ended the program shortly after the Royal Saudi Air Force ordered a large number of Panavia Tornado aircraft. Iran had been lost as a potential customer after the Iranian Revolution in 1979. India was also evaluated as another customer but backed down by ordering further Mirage 2000s and Mig-29s.The French Air Force preferred to concentrate on the Mirage 2000, leaving Dassault with no customers. Some of the expertise thus gained would later influence the Dassault Rafale.

The prototype made a total of 336 flights, the last taking place on January 8, 1988.

The only prototype moved to its final residence at the Musée de l'air et de l'espace (Paris Air and Space Museum) in November 1992.

== Specifications (Mirage 4000) ==
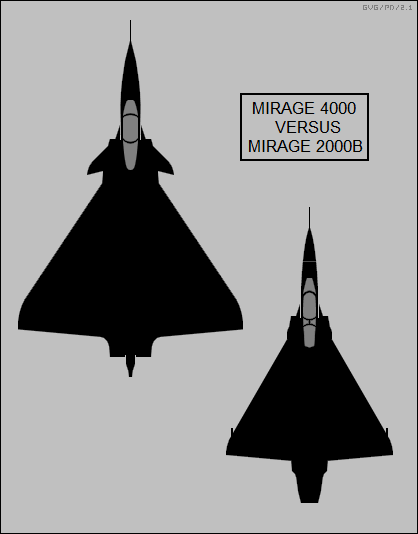

Data from Jane's all the World's Aircraft 1984–85, Dassault Aviation

General characteristics

- Crew: 1
- Length: 18.7 m (61 ft 4 in)
- Wingspan: 12 m (39 ft 4 in)
- Height: 5.8 m (19 ft 0 in)
- Wing area: 73 m^{2} (790 sq ft)
- Gross weight: 16,100 kg (35,494 lb) combat weight
- Fuel capacity: approx 11,000 L (2,900 US gal; 2,400 imp gal) internal fuel
- Powerplant: 2 × SNECMA M53 afterburning turbofan engines, 64.3 kN (14,500 lbf) thrust each dry, 95.1 kN (21,400 lbf) with afterburner

Performance

- Maximum speed: 2,445 km/h (1,519 mph, 1,320 kn) max level speed
- Maximum speed: Mach 2.3
- Maximum sustained speed: M2.2
- Approach speed: 260 km/h (160 mph; 140 kn)
- Range: 2,000 km (1,200 mi, 1,100 nmi)
- Combat range: 1,850 km (1,150 mi, 1,000 nmi) plus, with external tanks and recce pod
- Service ceiling: 20,000 m (66,000 ft)
- Rate of climb: 305 m/s (60,000 ft/min)
- Time to altitude: 15,000 m (49,000 ft) (M2) 3 minutes
- Wing loading: 220 kg/m^{2} (45 lb/sq ft) at combat weight
- Thrust/weight: 1.2

Armament

- Guns:

- 2× 30 mm (1.181 in) DEFA cannon with 125 rpg

- Hardpoints: 11 with a capacity of 8,000 kg (17,637 lb) +, with provisions to carry combinations of:
  - Other:

- up to 3× 2,500 L (660 US gal; 550 imp gal) drop tanks
- FLIR pod
- Recce pod
- ATLIS II laser designator pod
- two Sycomor countermeasure pod

- Rockets:

- up to 4× rocket pods

- Missiles:

- 2× long-range AAM
- 8-14 advanced AAMs
- up to 4 AGMs

- Bombs:

- up to 27 × 250 kg (551 lb) bombs

== See also ==
Related development

- Dassault Mirage 2000
- Dassault Mirage 2000N/2000D
- Atlas Carver
- Dassault MD.750

Aircraft of comparable role, configuration, and era

- Chengdu J-9
- McDonnell Douglas F-15 Eagle
- Sukhoi Su-27

Related lists

- List of fighter aircraft
- List of military aircraft of France

== Bibliography ==
- Carbonel, Jean-Christophe (2016). French Secret Projects. Vol. 1: Post War Fighters. Manchester, UK: Crecy Publishing. ISBN 978-1-91080-900-6.
- Coles, Joe (2023). "Ooh-là-là, c'est le Quatre-Mille: The Existential Crisis of the Super Mirage 4000". The Aviation Historian (43): 40–47. ISSN 2051-1930.
- Rocher, Alexis (2023). Super Mirage 4000, le rêve inachevé. Brussels: Skyshelf. ISBN 9789083330105.
- Rocher, Alexis (July 2024). "Les "Super Mirage", de l'ACF au 4000: histoire d'un rêve" [The "Super Mirage" of the French Air Force: History of a Dream]. Le Fana de l'Aviation (in French) (416): 22–35. ISSN 0757-4169.
