= Dassault MD.750 =

French delta-wing fighter concept aircraft

The Dassault MD.750 (Mirage 6000 or Mega Mirage or Spectre) was a single-seat twinjet tailless delta interceptor aircraft concept developed by Dassault Aviation beginning in 1958 and being periodically reworked through the 1960s.

== Design ==
Among the design goals were a maximum speed of Mach 3.5, with a high rate of climb of about 5 or 6 minutes to an altitude of 16,000 m (52,000 ft).

The delta wing is mounted low and extends most of the length of the fuselage aft of the intakes, as with other Mirage fighters, and it has a single vertical tail but uses square section intake ramps with a linear shock plate rather than shock cones, as used on the North American A-5 Vigilante and Mikoyan-Gurevich MiG-25 unlike other Mirage fighters, with a similarly boxy fuselage intake section to those types. The existence of the project under the name Spectre was confirmed by Dassault Aviation's Vice-president in a tweet containing several artist's renditions.

== See also ==
- Dassault Mirage 4000
- Avro Canada CF-105 Arrow
