= Soko J-21 Jastreb =

Attack aircraft

J-21 Jastreb
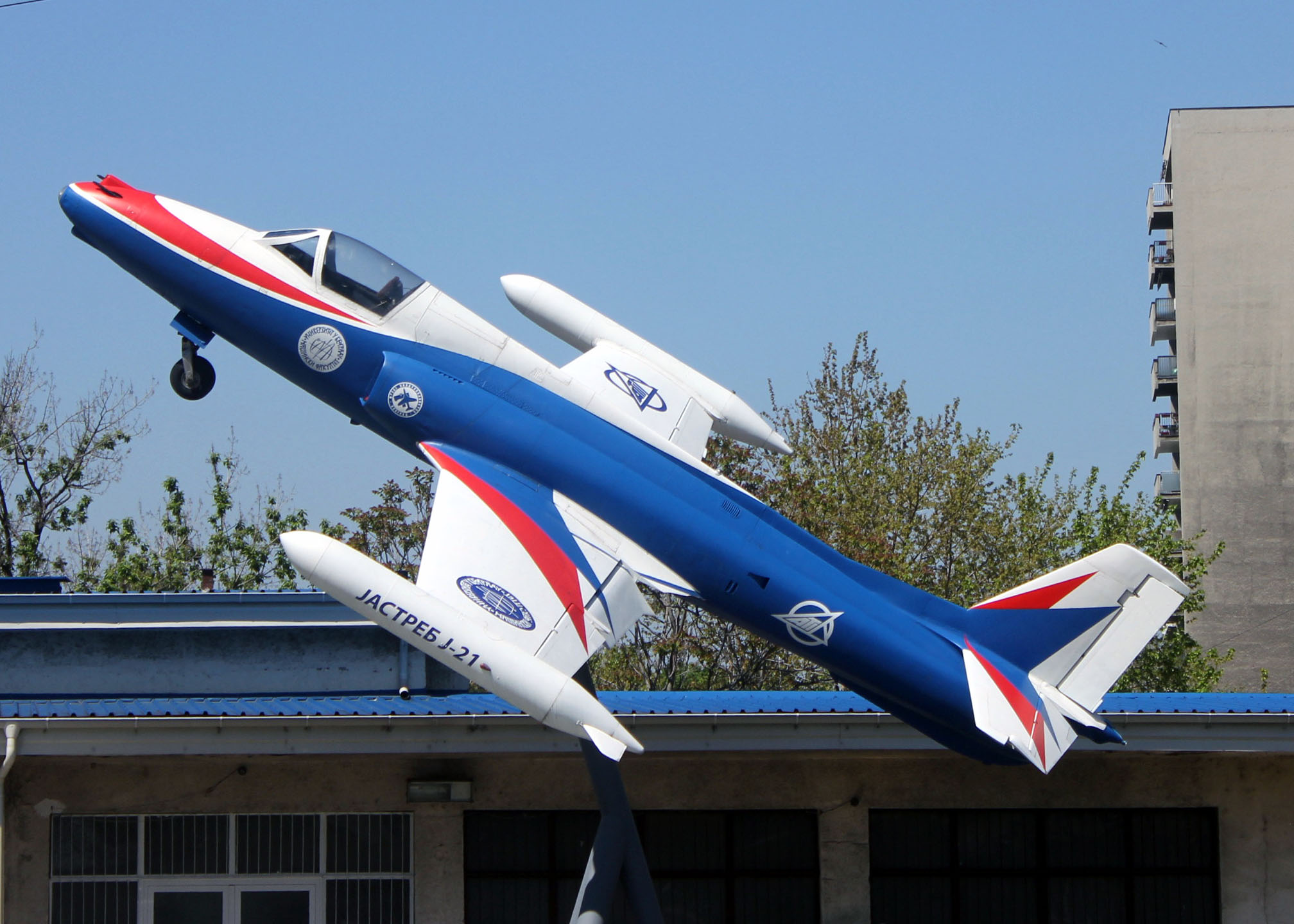
- A J-21 Jastreb on display at University of Belgrade, Department of Aerospace Engineering, 2019

General information
- Type: Light attack aircraft
- Manufacturer: SOKO
- Designer: Aeronautical Technical Institute (ATI)
- Status: Retired from Republika Srpska Air Force (2006)
- Primary user: Yugoslav Air Force
- Number built: 224

History
- Manufactured: 1968–1977
- First flight: 19 July 1965
- Developed from: Soko G-2 Galeb

The Soko J-21 Jastreb (from Serbian Cyrillic: јастреб, lit. 'hawk'), referred to as the J-1 Jastreb in some sources, is a Yugoslav single-seat, single-engined, light attack aircraft, designed by the Aeronautical Technical Institute (ATI) and Military Technical Institute (VTI), in Belgrade, and manufactured by SOKO in Mostar.

Derived from the G-2 Galeb advanced jet trainer and light attack aircraft, it was designed in single-seat ground-attack and two-seat advanced flying/weapon training versions.

== Design and development ==
The J-21 Jastreb was developed as a replacement for the Republic F-84 Thunderjet, which had been the most commonly used turbojet fighter-bomber aircraft of the Yugoslav Air Force until 1967. On the basis of the G-2 Galeb, the J-21 Jastreb was developed as a single-seat, ground-attack variant, flying for the first time on 19 July 1965.

Pilots sit on licence-built Folland Type 1-B ejection seats under individual canopies hinged on the starboard side in unpressurised cockpits. Instruments and controls are entirely conventional with manually operated flying controls and standard flight instruments.

Powered by a single BWB licence-built Rolls-Royce Viper Mk531, the Jastreb has a conventional aluminium alloy stressed-skin structure with few or no special features. The relatively thick aerofoil section, though limiting performance, provides room for fuel cells, and the retracted main undercarriage which retracts inwards, gives the Jastreb a wide track with excellent ground-handling characteristics. The trailing arm landing gear and relatively low-pressure tyres allow the Jastreb to operate from unprepared strips or rough-surfaced airfields.

Compared to the Galeb, the Jastreb has a strengthened structure, allowing more weapons to be carried, including three 12.7 mm (0.5 in) Browning AN/M3 machine guns, mounted in the nose of the aircraft. Also, the Jastreb is able to carry up to 800 kg (1,800 lb) on under-wing pylons, two inner pylons having a capacity of 250 kg (550 lb) for bombs, rocket launchers, and additional tanks, while the six outer pylons can carry VRZ-157 127 mm (5.00 in) rockets.

== Operational history ==
The J-21 entered service with the JRV (Yugoslavian Air Force) on 31 December 1968, with very few, if any, remaining in service.

=== First Congo War ===
A sketch of a Zairean Air Force Jastreb that was flown by the Serbian mercenaries, sporting the camouflage of now-defunct Yugoslav Air Force, with insignia erased to avoid confusion.

According to some reports, France and Yugoslavia supported Mobutu's government during the First Congo War. Namely, Yugoslavia agreed to deliver three J-21s and a single G-2 aircraft, as well as four MiG-21PFMs, while three Mi-24s were purchased from Ukraine. All these aircraft were based at Gbadolite and flown mainly by Serbian mercenaries.

A Yugoslavian pilot, Ratko Turčinović, was killed while flying an ultra-low-level pass over Gbadolite, clipping a lamp post with his wing. The wreckage of his aircraft fell directly into a column of young soldiers on a parade, killing dozens. The accident is reported as being attributed to Turčinović's alcohol dependency.

Soon after the accident, the Yugoslavian staff were expelled from the DRC and the Jastrebs were abandoned along with the Galebs. MiG-21s and Mi-24s, awaiting assembly by Russian or Ukrainian technicians at Gbadolite, were also abandoned and could still be seen on the ramp at Gbadolite in 2013.

=== Croatia ===
The first Yugoslav Air Force attack on Croatian troops took place on July 9, 1991 near Ilok, when two J-21 Jastreb attacked the base of the 1st Brigade of the Croatian National Guard. On August 24, 1991, during the Battle of Vukovar a member of the Croatian National Guard shot down one Yugoslav Air Force J-21 and damaged another aircraft with M55 anti-aircraft gun. On 15 November 1991, during the Battle of the Dalmatian Channels, three Yugoslav Air Force J-21 Jastrebs flew low over Brač and Šolta; minutes later, two were reportedly shot down by Croatian M55 anti-aircraft gun and Strela 2M. On 7 August 1995, during Operation Storm near Dvor na Una, members of the Air Defence Battalion of the 2nd Guards Brigade shot down a J-21 Jastreb over Bosanski Novi.

=== Bosnia and Herzegovina ===
Six J-21 Jastrebs with Croatian Serb and Bosnian Serb pilots were engaged by United States Air Force (USAF) General Dynamics F-16 Fighting Falcons during Operation Deny Flight for violating the NATO-enforced no-fly zone over Bosnia and Herzegovina. The USAF claimed four J-21s shot down by F-16s, while the Serbs claimed five Jastrebs as lost. The discrepancy likely stems from a damaged Jastreb crashing near the airfield after the F-16s had departed.

== Variants ==
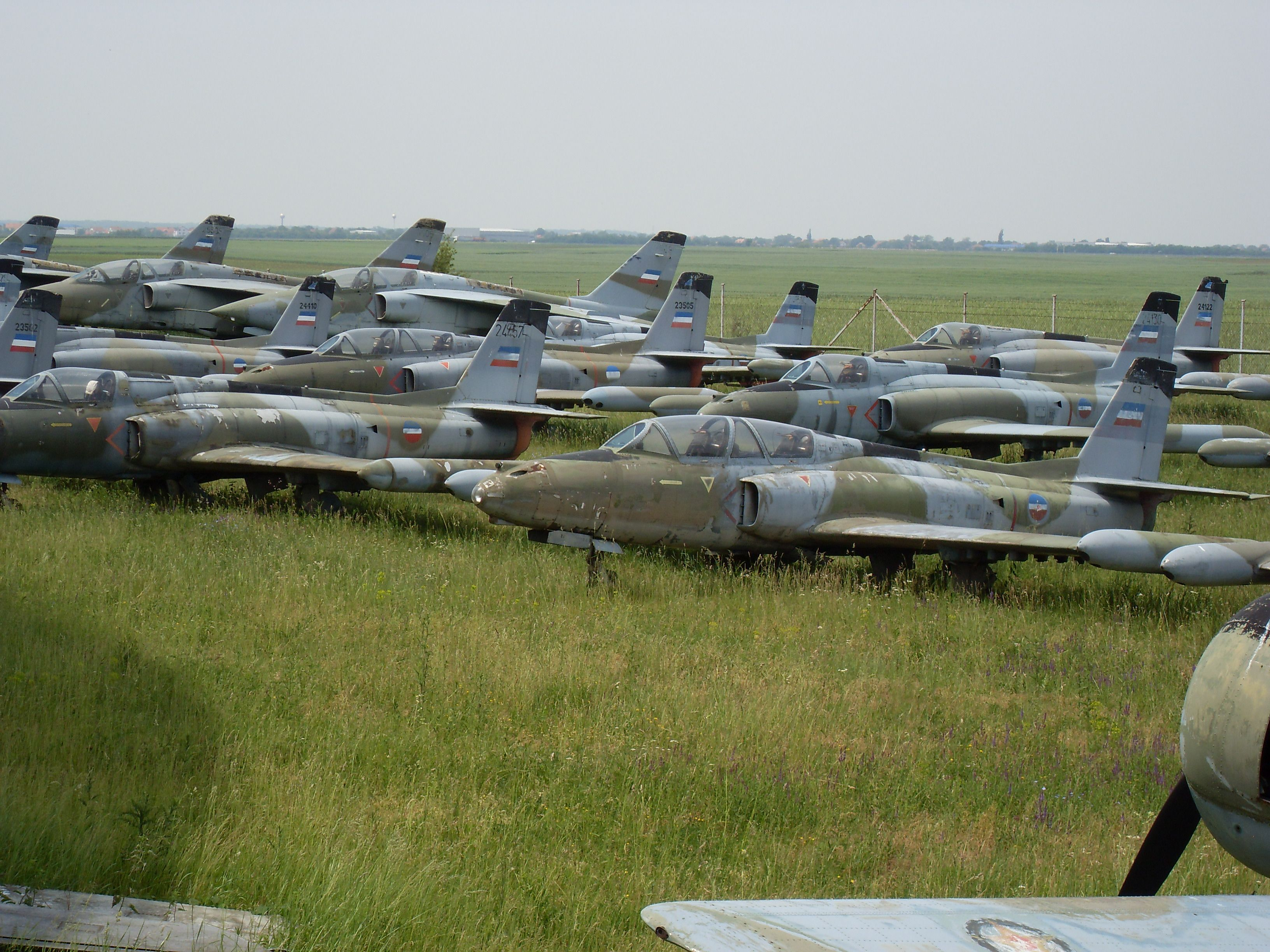
Several NJ-21 and RJ-21 at Belgrade Aviation Museum, 2009

J-21 Jastreb
Single-seat ground-attack, reconnaissance aircraft
J-21E Jastreb
Export version of the J-1
RJ-21 Jastreb
Single-seat tactical reconnaissance aircraft
RJ-21E Jastreb
Export version of the RJ-1
NJ-21
Two-seat advanced flying trainer / weapons trainer / light ground-attack aircraft

== Operators ==
=== Former operators ===
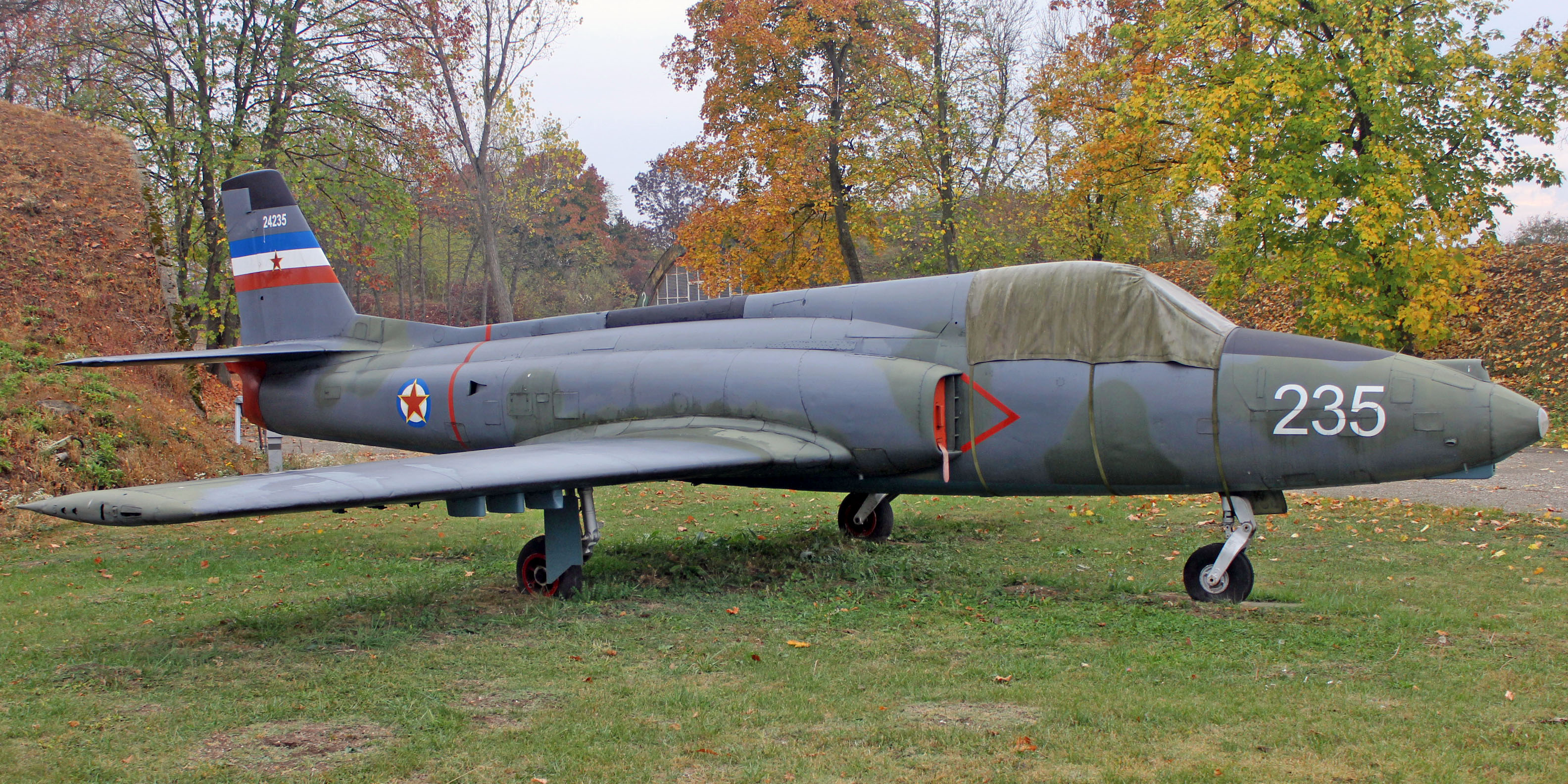
A preserved J-21 in Yugoslav Air Force markings

Republika Srpska

- operated 12 J-21 for training and for ground attack

(Libya) Libyan Jamahiriya

- Libyan Air Force

Yugoslavia

- Yugoslav Air Force

Zaire

- Zaire Air Force

Zambia

- Zambia Air Force

Libya

- Free Libyan Air Force

== Aircraft on display ==
=== Serbia ===
J-21/RJ-21
The original prototype and over 31 J-21s are located at the Museum of Aviation in Belgrade.

== Specifications (J-21 Jastreb) ==
Line drawing of J-1 Jastreb

Data from

General characteristics

- Crew: 1
- Length: 10.88 m (35 ft 8 in)
- Wingspan: 10.56 m (34 ft 8 in)
- Height: 3.64 m (11 ft 11 in)
- Wing area: 19.43 m^{2} (209.1 sq ft)
- Max takeoff weight: 5,100 kg (11,244 lb)
- Fuel capacity: 440 kg (970 lb) internal fuel + 435 kg (959 lb) in 2× 275 L (60 imp gal; 73 US gal) jettisonable wing-tip fuel tanks.
- Powerplant: 1 × BMB (Rolls-Royce/Bristol Siddeley) Viper Mk 531 turbojet engine, 13.32 kN (2,990 lbf) thrust
- Powerplant: 2 × JATO units solid-fuelled rockets, 4.45 kN (1,000 lbf) thrust each

Performance

- Maximum speed: 820 km/h (510 mph, 440 kn)
- Cruise speed: 740 km/h (460 mph, 400 kn) at 5,000 m (16,000 ft)
- Range: 1.520 km (0.944 mi, 0.821 nmi) with tip tanks
- Service ceiling: 12,000 m (39,000 ft)
- g limits: +8 -4
- Rate of climb: 21 m/s (4,100 ft/min)

Armament

- Guns: 3 × 12.7 mm (0.5 in) Browning AN/M3 machine guns
- Hardpoints: 8 with a capacity of inboard pylons (2 of) 250 kg (550 lb), outboard pylons (6 of) 50 kg (110 lb), with provisions to carry combinations of:
  - Other:
- 2 × 150 L (33 imp gal; 40 US gal) napalm tank
- 2 × rocket pods each with 12× 55 mm (2.17 in) rockets
- Rockets: 6 × VRZ-157 127 mm (5.00 in) rockets
- Bombs:
- 2 × 250 kg (550 lb) general-purpose bombs or
- 2 × 150 kg (330 lb) cluster bombs or
- 2 × 120 kg (260 lb) cluster fragmentation bombs

Avionics
K-14C or K-14A gun sight

== See also ==
- Ikarus 452M

Related development

- Soko G-2 Galeb
