= IAR 95 =

Romanian cancelled jet fighter project

- Model of the final design

General information
- Type: Fighter/ground attack aircraft
- National origin: Romania
- Manufacturer: Avioane Craiova
- Designer: INCAS Romania
- Status: Project cancelled in 1988
- Primary user: Romanian Air Force (intended)
- Number built: None

The IAR 95 Spey was a Romanian project to produce a supersonic fighter jet for the Romanian Air Force. The project was started in the late 1970s and cancelled in 1981. Shortly after, the project was restarted again. The project was cancelled for good in 1988 due to lack of funds before a prototype could be built, although a full-scale mockup was being constructed.

== Design and development ==
The design was a high-wing monoplane with lateral air intakes, a single fin, and a single engine. Designs with two fins and two engines were also considered, but it was decided to go with the single-engine single-fin design. Other designations given to this project are IAR-101 and IAR-S and refer to different design layouts.

Romania considered a joint program with Yugoslavia, but the latter declined because it was designing its own supersonic fighter jet, the Novi Avion.

== Specifications ==
The following technical data applies to the design that progressed the furthest:

Data from IAR 95 specifications

General characteristics

- Crew: 1 or 2
- Length: 16 m (52 ft 6 in)
- Wingspan: 9.3 m (30 ft 6 in)
- Height: 5.45 m (17 ft 11 in)
- Wing area: 27.9 m^{2} (300 sq ft)
- Empty weight: 7,880 kg (17,372 lb)
- Max takeoff weight: 15,200 kg (33,510 lb)
- Powerplant: 1 × Tumansky R-29-300 afterburning turbojet engine, 81.4 kN (18,300 lbf) thrust dry, 122 kN (27,000 lbf) with afterburner

Performance

- Maximum speed: 1,500 km/h (930 mph, 810 kn) +
- Maximum speed: Mach 2

Armament

- 3,200 kg (7,055 lb) of various missiles and bombs

== See also ==
- FMA SAIA 90

Aircraft of comparable role, configuration, and era

- Dassault Mirage F1
- JF-17 Thunder
- Novi Avion

Related lists

- List of fighter aircraft
