= SOKO =

Yugoslav aircraft manufacturer

Soko
- Logo from 1974
- Industry: Aerospace
- Predecessor: Ikarus
- Founded: 1950
- Defunct: early 1990s
- Headquarters: Mostar, SR Bosnia and Herzegovina, Yugoslavia

Soko (Serbo-Croatian Cyrillic: Соко) was a Yugoslav aircraft manufacturer based in Mostar, SR Bosnia and Herzegovina. The company was responsible for the production of many military aircraft for the Yugoslav Air Force.

SOKO was created in 1950 by the relocation of the aircraft factory section of Ikarus company from Zemun, SR Serbia. Officially founded as "Preduzeće Soko" (Soko Corporation, soko meaning "falcon" in Serbian), soon after it was renamed "Soko Vazduhoplovna Industrija, RO Vazduhoplovstvo" (Soko Aeronautical Industry, WO (Work Organization) Aeronautics). Its first director was Yugoslav People's Army colonel Ivan Sert. The following directors of the company were engineers Miljenko Pješčić and Tomislav Mirić. The serial manufacture of numerous types of aircraft was projected by the Aeronautical Technical Institute in Belgrade. Besides aircraft, SOKO also produced helicopters under licence. Located in the vicinity of Mostar, it mostly used the Mostar Airport for test flights.

By the 1980s, SOKO was working on the Novi Avion project, intended to develop an indigenous fourth-generation, supersonic multi-role fighter that would enabled the Yugoslav Air Force to be supplied with domestically-built modern fighters. The production was planned to begin around 1991; however, the outbreak of the Yugoslav wars and the enactment of an international arms embargo caused the project to be cancelled. During the early 1990s, the factory ceased aircraft production altogether. The facilities were partially dismantled and relocated to Serbia, where they were aligned with the Utva Aviation Industry in Pančevo which had already been working closely with SOKO in the manufacturing of Orao and Super Galeb.

== History ==
During the late 1940s, as a result of the Yugoslav government's policy to relocate Serbian industry, a large portion of both the infrastructure and personal from the aeronautical section of the Ikarus company from Zemun, SR Serbia was uprooted and transferred to Mostar, SR Bosnia and Herzegovina. During 1950, these assets were integrated into the newly formed aircraft manufacturer SOKO, which immediately begin working on various aeronautical technologies. During these early years, the company produced the Soko 522 trainer aircraft, as well as providing maintenance support for the Yugoslav Air Force, particularly its fleet of American-built F-84 Thunderjet fighters.

During 1957, Yugoslavia's VTI (Aeronautical Technical Institute) commenced design work on what would subsequently become the Soko G-2 Galeb. The principal purpose for its development was to produce a domestic replacement for the American-built Lockheed T-33 Shooting Star, which at the time was the most commonly used jet trainer aircraft in use by the Yugoslav Air Force; thus, the Galeb was to be capable of meeting the varied qualities and requirements involved in performing ab initio, intermediate, and advanced instructional training missions. The Galeb was developed as a collaborative effort between Yugoslavia and the United Kingdom, and reportedly contributed significantly to the export value of the latter; a significant proportion of components and ancillary equipment, such as the powerplant, ejector seats, and navigational fittings amongst others, that were installed upon the aircraft had been sourced from or were directly produced by a range of British aerospace manufacturers. Sponsorship for the aircraft's development was provided by the British engine manufacturer Rolls-Royce Limited, whose Armstrong Siddeley Viper turbojet engine was selected to power the type.

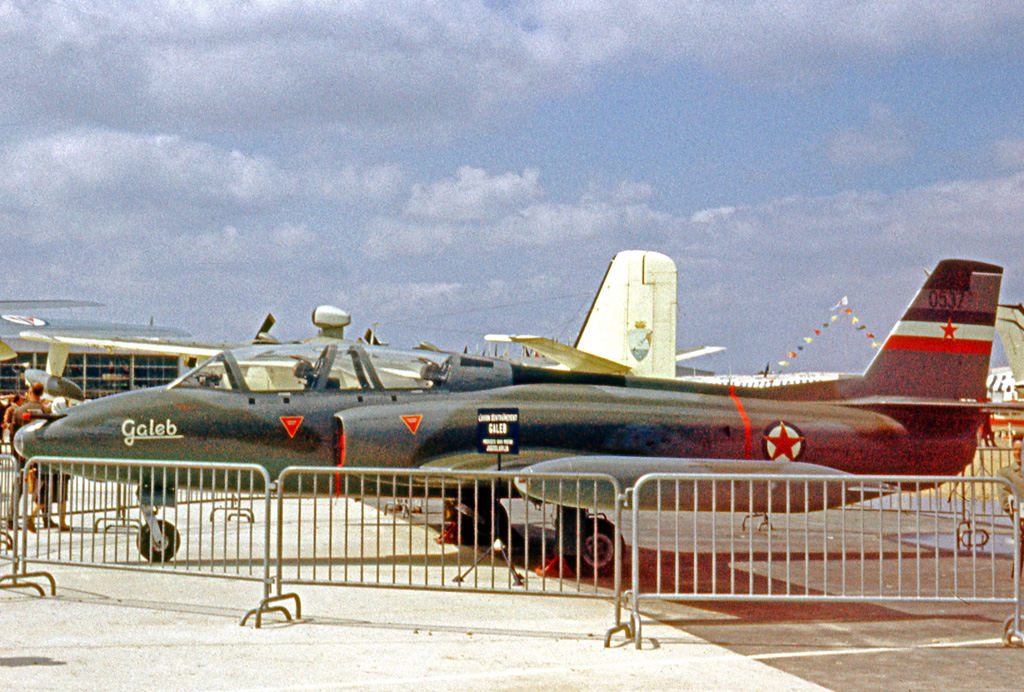
Soko G-2 Galeb of the Yugoslav Air Force exhibited by the company at the 1963 Paris Air Show

During 1964, production of the Galeb commenced, making it the first indigenously-developed jet aircraft to enter mass production in Yugoslavia (the first jet-powered plane built by Yugoslavia was the Ikarus 451M in 1952, which did not enter production). A ground attack-orientated derivative of the Galeb, named the J-21 Jastreb, was also developed shortly thereafter; aside from the strengthening of the airframe, one distinct difference between the two aircraft was the deletion of the rear cockpit on the J-21 Jastreb, this location has instead been covered by a fairing and the internal space used to contain avionics and other aircraft equipment. Beyond domestic adoption with the Yugoslav Air force, the Galeb achieved export sales as well; the Libyan Air Force was a prolific operator of the type; by 2002, it reportedly possessed a total of 80 aircraft remaining in its inventory.

During 1970, the neighbouring nations of Romania and Yugoslavia began discussions on the subject of jointly developing a new ground-attack orientated fighter aircraft. On 20 May 1971, the Romanian and Yugoslavian governments signed an agreement for the formation of YuRom, a joint research and development venture between the two nations. According to aviation author John C. Fredriksen, the announcement was a logical extension of political policy, as the two nations' heads of state, Josip Broz Tito of Yugoslavia and Nicolae Ceaușescu, had both historically sought to avoid overreliance upon the Soviet Union, preferring to build ties and cooperative projects with other friendly or neutral nations. Due to political sensitivities and a strong desire to avoid one nation upstaging the other, the aircraft featured two separate names; in Romania, it was known as the IAR-93 Vultur while in Yugoslavia it was referred to as the Soko J-22 Orao. Serial production of the J-22 was performed at SOKO's Mostar facility, production was brought to a halt in 1992, and the factory itself heavily damaged, by the series of events commonly referred to as the Yugoslav Wars. Various upgrade programmes for the J-22 were proposed during the 1990s; reportedly, such efforts would have been focused upon its avionics. However, such ambitions were heavily undermined by the dismantling of the Mostar factory during the Yugoslav Wars and the collapse of Romania's communist government.

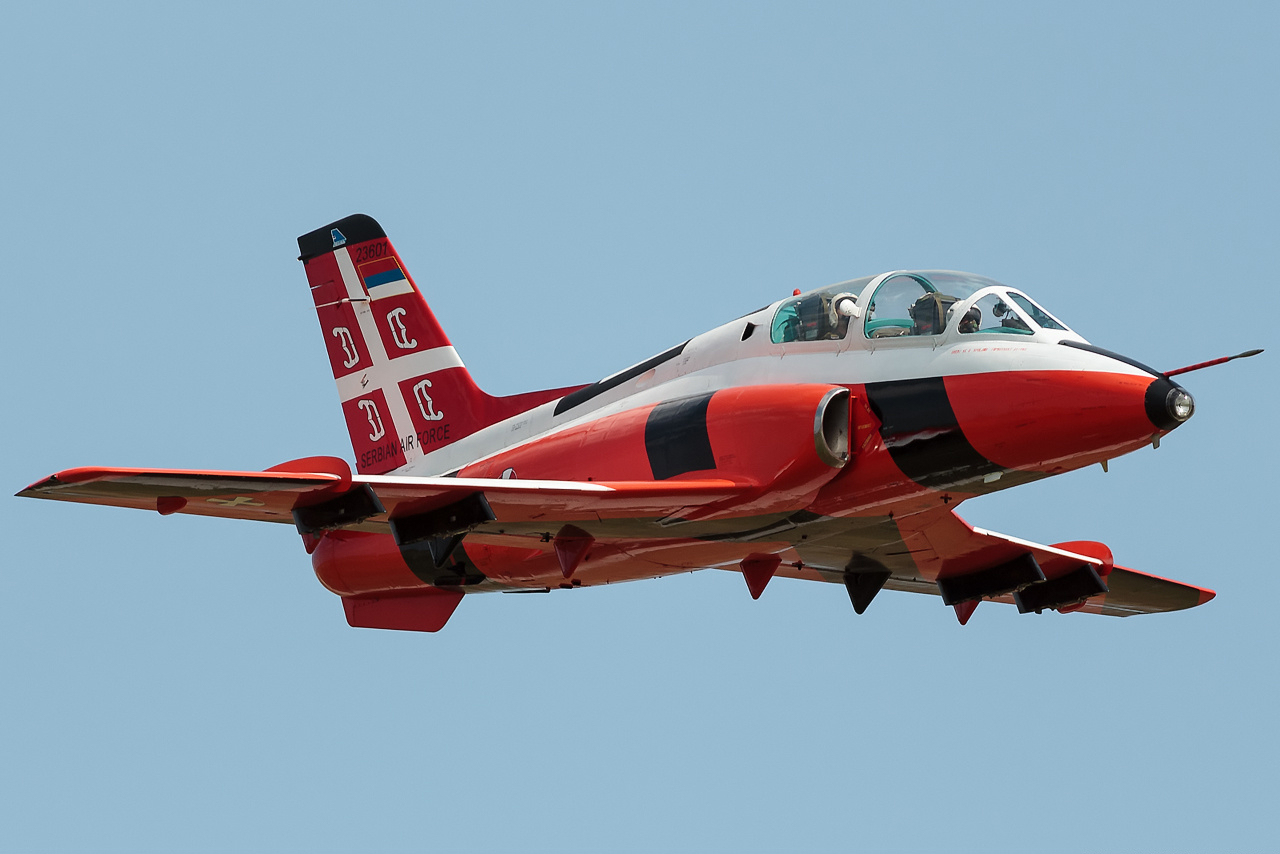
A Soko G-4 Super Galeb of the Serbian Air Force

Another programme begun during the 1970s would result in the development of the G-4 Super Galeb; it was designed as a replacement for Yugoslav Air Force's existing inventory of G-2 Galebs. According to aviation periodical Flight International, the Super Galeb showed unmistakable lineage from the earlier G-2, sharing the same British-sourced Rolls-Royce Viper turbojet engine, albeit uprated for greater performance. However, aviation historian Christopher Chant notes that: "the Super Galeb bares no more relation to the G-2 Galeb than an identity of role, being an altogether more advanced aircraft. Beyond the domestic market, it also competed internationally against jet trainers such as the Italian Aermacchi MB-339, the Czechoslovak Aero L-39 Albatros, and the Spanish CASA C-101; Flight International observes that, while the Super Galeb offered less performance that the French-German Dassault/Dornier Alpha Jet, it was substantially cheaper to procure.

During the mid-1980s, the Novi Avion programme was initiated with the aim of increasing Yugoslavia's political independence by becoming self-sufficient in the manufacture of military equipment; at that point, air superiority fighter jets were the only major element in which Yugoslavia was still reliant upon imports, having obtained the capability to manufacture all other military equipment. Thus, the Avion was intended to be used as a replacement for the Yugoslavian Air Force's fleet of around 120 Mikoyan-Gurevich MiG-21s. Development was a recognised priority programme for the Yugoslavian People's Army and was partly funded by the national government out of general research and development and modernisation funds, as well as being partly provided by industry. The Novi Avion was to be Yugoslavia's first supersonic aircraft, accordingly, the national industry lacked experience in the design and testing of such fighters and sought out external partners to provide assistance. Both France and French company Dassault Aviation's upcoming Rafale fighter bore a heavy influence on the design of the Avion.

During the 1990s, Yugoslavia disintegrated into several different nations, which quickly resulted in the Avion programme being abandoned due to the financial resources necessary to start production of the fighter having become unavailable following the break-up of the country. Reportedly, work had been initially halted due to the lack of funding while further efforts were made to acquire foreign partnership arrangements. If the development had not been terminated, the first aircraft was scheduled to have conduct its maiden flight during 1992; the Avion was reportedly expected to enter squadron service at some point during the mid-2000s.

Throughout the 1970s and 1980s, SOKO was involved in various partnerships. In addition to working with Avioane Craiova to co-develop the J-22 Orao/IAR-93, Soko also cooperated with Sikorsky, Westland and Aérospatiale in producing various helicopters under license. Throughout the company's existence, its aircraft production activities were mainly destined to fulfill the needs of the Yugoslav Air Force, but exporting aircraft was also an option. J-1 Jastreb were exported to Libya and Zambia. G-2 Galeb was exported to Libya, Zaire and Zambia. Six Super Galebs were exported to Burma, while the start of the Yugoslav wars and the international sanctions halted the production and blocked outstanding orders for the G-4 Super Galeb to Malaysia, Singapore, and Indonesia.

== Aircraft ==
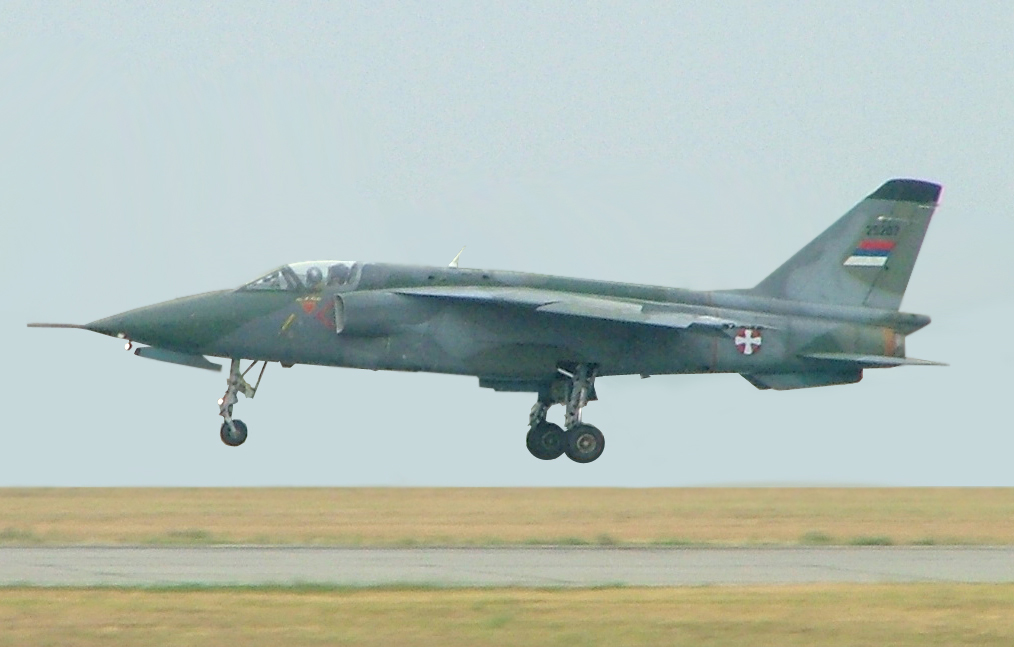
Soko J-22

Model name	First flight	Number built	Type
Soko 522	1955	~110	Single piston engine monoplane trainer
Soko WS-55		38 (Note: An additional 7 aircraft were supplied complete from Britain.)	License built single piston engine utility helicopter
Soko J-20 Kraguj	1962	43	Single piston engine monoplane light attack airplane
Soko J-21 Jastreb	1965	224	Single jet engine monoplane light attack airplane
Soko J-22 Orao	1974	~133	Twin jet engine monoplane attack airplane
Soko G-2 Galeb	1961	248	Single jet engine monoplane trainer
Soko G-4 Super Galeb	1978	85	Single jet engine monoplane trainer
Soko Gazelle		132	License built single turboshaft engine utility helicopter
Novi Avion	N/A	0	Unbuilt single jet engine monoplane multirole combat aircraft

== See also ==
- List of companies of the Socialist Federal Republic of Yugoslavia
