= Pratt & Whitney PW1120 =

Turbojet engine

PW1120
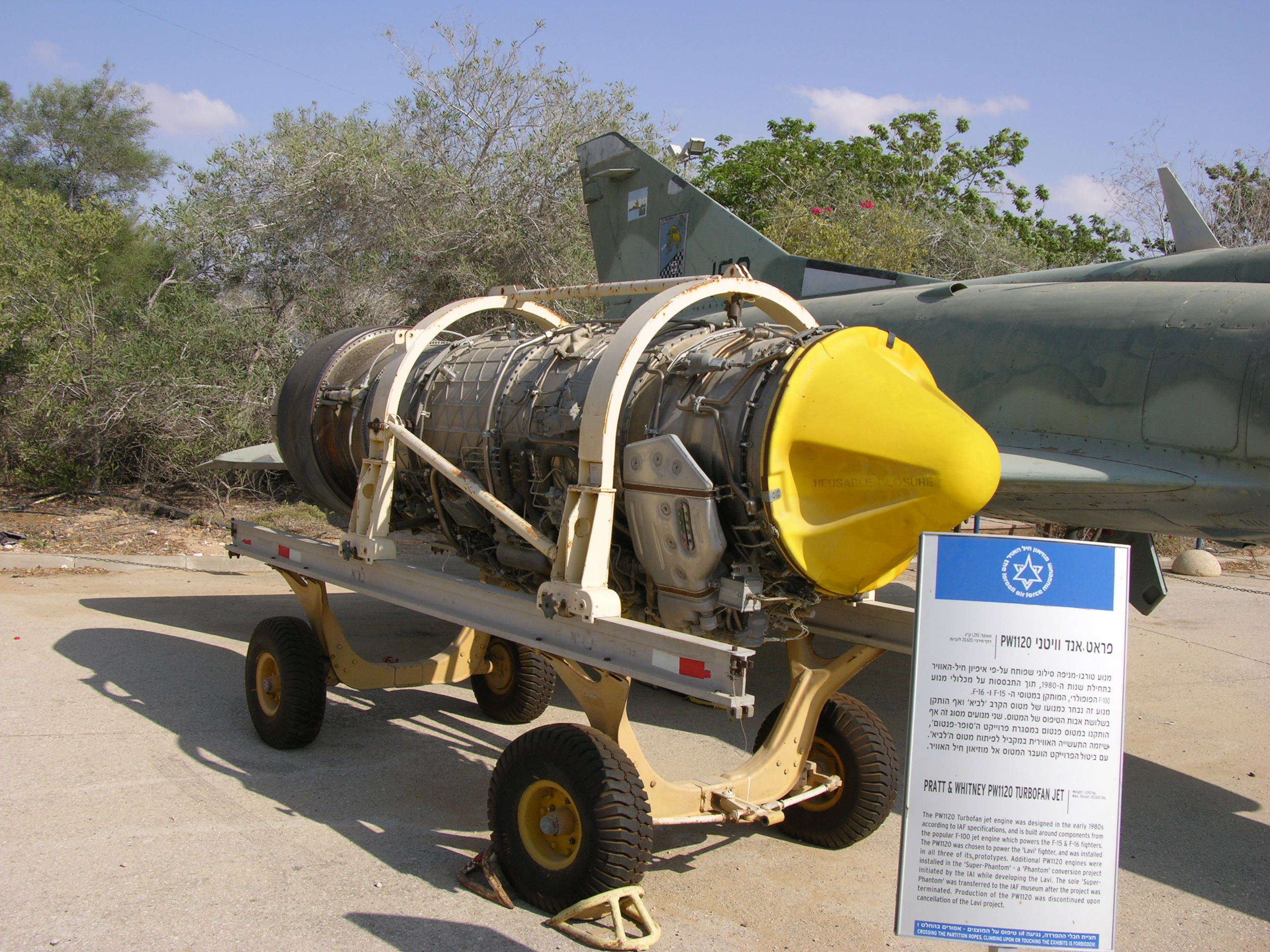
- Type: Turbojet
- National origin: United States
- Manufacturer: Pratt & Whitney
- First run: 1980s
- Major applications: IAI Lavi
- Developed from: Pratt & Whitney F100

The Pratt & Whitney PW1120 turbojet is a derivative of the F100 turbofan. It was installed as a modification to a single F-4E fighter jet, and powered the canceled IAI Lavi.

== Development ==
The development of the PW1120, according to Israeli Air Force (IDF/AF) specifications, started in June 1980. It retained the F100 core module, gearbox, fuel pump, forward ducts, as well as the F100 digital electronic control, with only minor modifications. Unique PW1120 components included a wide chord low pressure (LP) compressor, single-stage uncooled low pressure (LP) turbine, simplified single stream augmentor, and a lightweight convergent/divergent nozzle. Full scale testing was initiated in June 1982, and flight clearance of the PW1120 was tested in August 1984. The PW1120 had 70 percent similarity with the F100, so the IDF/AF would not need a special facility for spare parts. It would be built under licence by Bet-Shemesh Engines Limited in Israel.

IAI installed one PW1120 in the starboard nacelle of an F-4E-32-MC of the IDF/AF (Number 334/66-0327) to explore the airframe/powerplant combination for an upgrade program of the F-4E, known as Kurnass 2000 ("Heavy Hammer") or Super Phantom and to act as an engine testbed for the Lavi. The powerplant was more powerful, and more fuel efficient than the General Electric J79-GE-17 turbojet normally installed in the F-4E. The structural changes included modifying the air inlet ducts, new powerplant attachment points, new or modified powerplant bay doors, new airframe mounted gearbox with integrated drive generators and automatic throttle system. It also included a modified bleed management and air-conditioning ducting system, modified fuel and hydraulic systems, and a powerplant control/airframe interface. It was first flown on 30 July 1986.

Two PW1120 powerplants were installed in the same F-4E and it was flown for the first time on 24 April 1987. This proved very successful, allowing the Kurnass 2000 to exceed Mach 1 without the afterburners, and endowing a combat thrust-to-weight ratio of 1.04 (17 per cent better than the F-4E). This improved the sustained turn rate by 15 per cent, the climb rate by 36 per cent, medium-level acceleration by 27 per cent and low-level speed with 18 bombs from 1,046 km/h to 1,120 km/h (654 - 700 mph or 565 kn to 605 kn). It was demonstrated at the Paris Air Show in 1987.

== Applications ==
- IAI Lavi
- IAI Nammer (as designed, not built)
- Boeing Super Phantom (proposal)
- F-4 Kurnass 2000 testbed

== Specification (PW1120) ==
==== General characteristics ====
- Type: afterburning turbojet
- Length: 161.8 in (4,110 mm)
- Diameter: 40.2 in (1,021 mm)
- Dry weight: 2,848 lb (1,292 kg)

==== Components ====
- Compressor: axial compressor with 3 fan and 10 compressor stages
- Bypass ratio: 0.36:1
- Turbine: 2 low-pressure and 2 high-pressure stages

==== Performance ====
- Maximum thrust:
- 13,530 lbf (61.18 kN / 6,137 kgf) military thrust
- 20,585 lbf (91.56 kN / 9,337 kgf) with afterburner
- Specific fuel consumption:
- Military thrust: 0.8 lb/lb/hr (22.7 mg/(N·s))
- Full afterburner: 1.856 lb/lb/hr (52.65 mg/(N·s))
- Thrust-to-weight ratio: 7.23

== See also ==
Related development

- Pratt & Whitney F100

Related lists

- List of aircraft engines
