= Aeronautical Technical Institute =

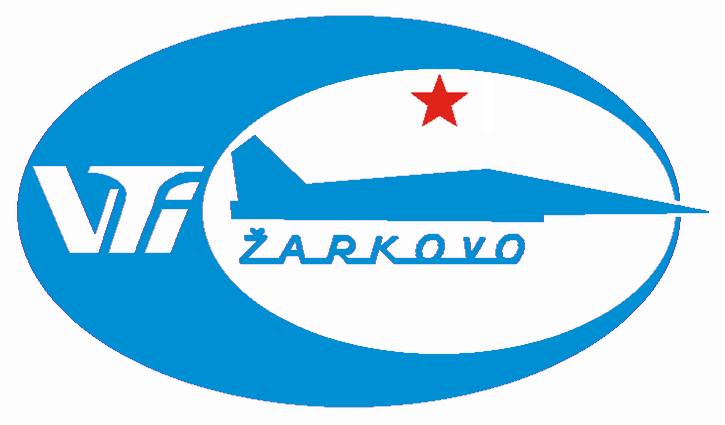
Logo of the Aeronautical Technical Institute, from its latter days, circa 1990.

Aeronautical Technical Institute (Serbian: Ваздухопловнотехнички институт, romanized: Vazduhoplovnotehnički institut) was a Yugoslav design bureau for aeronautical research and design of military aircraft. It was established on August 10, 1946, by an order of the Supreme Commander of the Armed Forces of Yugoslavia, and was located in Žarkovo, Belgrade. It existed from 1946 to 1992 and was responsible for the design of the majority of Yugoslav military aircraft. Aircraft designed by the institute include the J-20 Kraguj, the G-2 Galeb, the G-4 Super Galeb, the J-22 Orao, the Lasta and the (cancelled) Novi Avion.

After the dissolution of Yugoslavia and the Yugoslav People's Army (JNA), the Aeronautical Technical Institute was dissolved and assimilated into the Military Technical Institute (Serbian: Војнотехнички институт, romanized: Vojnotehnički institut; abbr. VTI) in an effort to reduce developing cost and maintenance since both institutes were on Belgrade district territory. Some have characterized this assimilation as having a detrimental effect on the quality and volume of aeronautics-related research and development conducted thereafter in VTI.

Aircraft designed by Aeronautical Technical Institute were produced by manufacturers such as SOKO (Mostar) and Utva Aviation Industry (Pančevo).

Currently active aircraft programs in Military Technical Institute are Lasta 95 trainer and Kobac counter-insurgency aircraft, both the derivatives of Lasta.

== Experimental facilities ==
- Low speed, open-circuit wind tunnel T-31 (obsolete; dismantled)
- Low speed, closed return wind tunnel T-32
- Cavitation water tunnel T-33
- Hypersonic blowdown wind tunnel T-34
- Large low-speed closed return wind tunnel T-35
- Trisonic indraft wind tunnel T-36
- Trisonic blowdown wind tunnel T-38. Developed and built in cooperation with companies from Canada and United States. Built to support development of Novi Avion, missiles and other similar advanced programs.

== See also ==
- Military Technical Institute
- Utva Aviation Industry
- Aircraft industry of Serbia
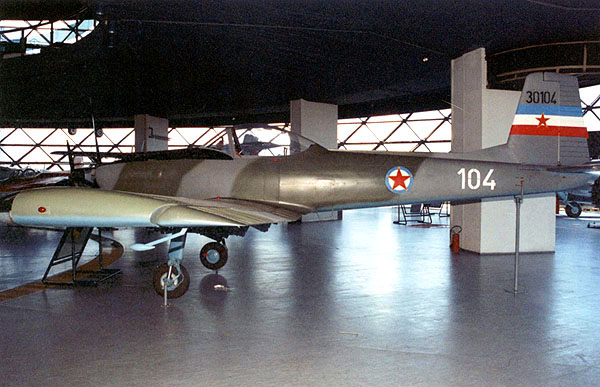
J-20 Kraguj

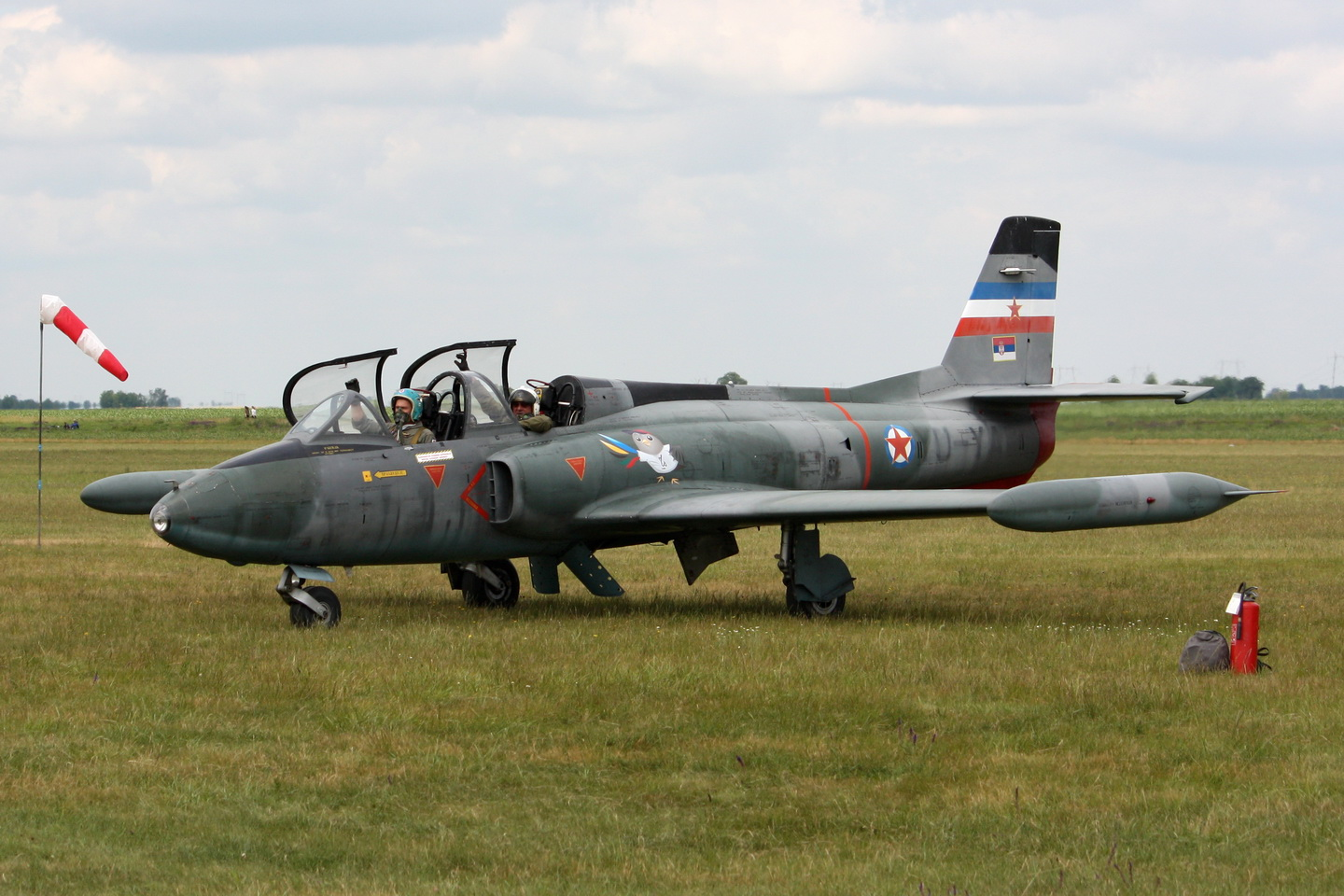
G-2 Galeb

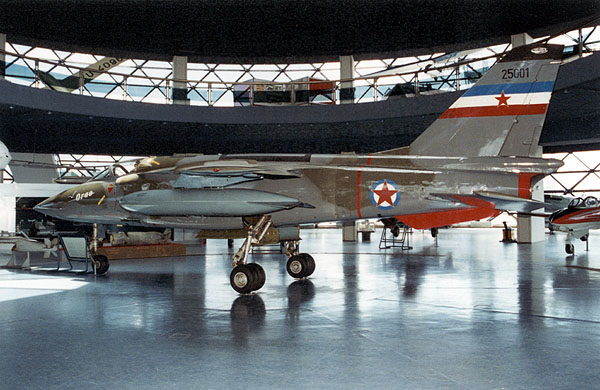
J-22 Orao

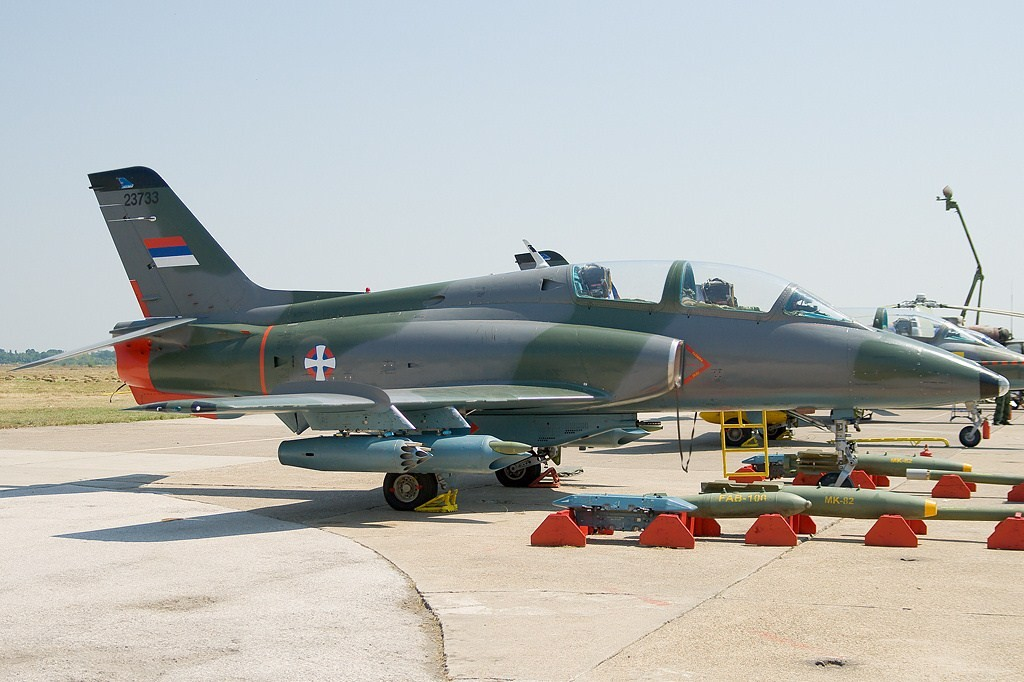
G-4 Super Galeb

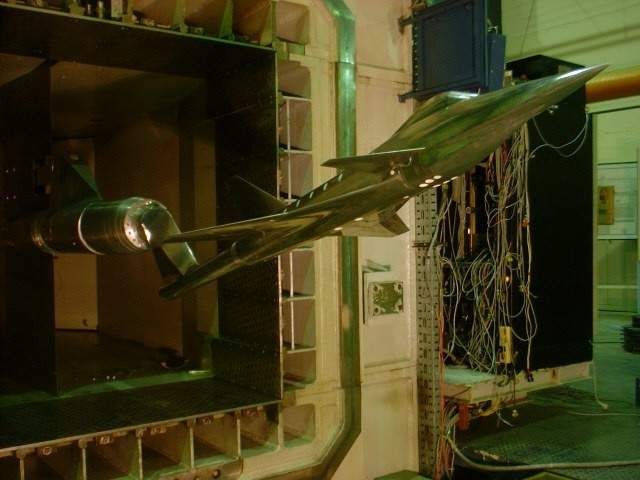
Trisonic wind tunnel T-38 with a Novi Avion model
