= FMA SAIA 90 =

Argentine cancelled jet fighter project

- An artist's impression of FMA SAIA 90

General information
- Type: Air superiority fighter
- National origin: Argentina
- Manufacturer: Fábrica Militar de Aviones
- Status: Cancelled
- Primary user: Argentine Air Force (planned)
- Number built: 0

The FMA SAIA 90 was a cancelled air superiority fighter aircraft project, designed by the FMA (Fábrica Militar de Aviones) with the collaboration of Dornier in the mid-1980s. The SAIA 90 was the last stage of the ACA (Avión Caza Argentino) project, which was started by the National Reorganization Process to develop an Argentine fighter aircraft.

== Development ==
By 1980 the Fabrica Militar de Aviones and Dornier had an ongoing relationship as a result of the combined development of the IA 63, and both were considered a cooperative agreement for the production of future airplanes. This agreement called to both parties to establish a common office in the city of Córdoba, Argentina within the year for the production, marketing and associated support services of their products.

The development of a trainer was the first of three steps in Fábrica Argentina de Aviones' strategy, elaborated after the development of the IA 58 Pucará by the mid-1960s. The steps of this strategy included the Pampa, a light training and combat aircraft.

The German maker produced a series of preliminary designs, which contemplated various aspects for a combat aircraft, which the air force could then adopt to its own requirements.

The Fábrica Militar de Aviones estimated development would take 12 to 15 years after specifications were approved. The first flight of the prototype was planned for 1989, with deliveries two years later.

== Design ==
The Dornier studies included analyses of the basic requirements, including air combat under anticipated operative conditions, and taking into account the characteristics of likely weapons.

SAIA 90 from below

According to the analysis the aircraft should be capable of a sustained maneuvering speed of Mach 0.9 at an altitude of 6000 m; quick acceleration from Mach 0.9 to 1.5 at 9000 m, high deceleration, independent of the relative speed; reasonable combat autonomy with integral fuel tanks; and minimal radar and infrared signatures (Stealth).

Possible armament included:

- 1 Mauser 27mm gun with 150 rounds.
- 2 AAM InfraRed (AIM-9 Sidewinder class)
- 4 AAM radar-guided (AIM-120 AMRAAM class).
- Up to 5000 kg of air-to-surface munitions.

=== The avionics ===
The air-to-air radar was to be able to detect a 5 m^{2} target at a distance of 90 km without being detected by enemy ECM, and track 6 targets that could be identified with IFF. For air-to-ground attacks, the radar was to be able to map the terrain.

=== Configuration ===
Although it was desirable to achieve a combination of the advantages that a heavily loaded delta wing with low weight offers; the trans-sonic/subsonic turn rate, longitudinal stability and short field characteristics desired were impossible to combine into a single wing design.

The opposing solution of commitment for the pattern, was the continuation of the border of attack of the wings that generated a vortex of high energy and it improved the aerodynamic yield notably in big angles of incidence. Another characteristic of the design was the artificial longitudinal stability that allowed equilibrating the airplane by means of the application of positive forces on the line planes.

This way a direct wing was configured with big arrow angles, continuations in the union wing-fuselage and a double derives located before the stabilizers that it keeps certain likeness to the F/A-18C Hornet.

Engines were two turbofan of 5600 kg of thrust (possibly General Electric F404). Maximum speed was to be around Mach 2. Empty weight was to be 7.800 kg. This relatively low value would be achieved by means of the use of compound materials. The experience of Dornier in these materials was wide (Alpha Jet and Do 228). In the proposal for this airplane suggested the use in the wing of 65% Carbon-fiber-reinforced polymer (CFRP), 20% aluminium and the rest in several materials as the titanium, the front fuselage would have 60% of CFRP, the central 18% and the bottom 10%, being completed with other materials employees in the wing, and the stabilizers would have 55% of CFRP, while the fin would take 70%, the same materials would be used for the intake ramps and the landing gear. (aeroespacio 1982/83)

== Stages of Project ==
The three stages of the project were:

- The FMA IA 63 Pampa, a trainer/attack aircraft, which was the only of the three to reach production. The Vought Pampa 2000 version was entered into the US JPATS competition in the 1990s but lost to the T-6 Texan II.
- The IA 67 Cordoba, a light attack bomber project that remained unbuilt.
- The SAIA 90, an air superiority aircraft with "stealth" characteristics (including a small radar cross-section).

== Partners ==
By the middle of 1980 Fábrica Militar de Aviones faced serious financial difficulties, with a deficit of US$50 million annually. It searched for partners to face diverse business to allow it to survive, giving 49% of their property.

It was evident that the factory could not complete the project by itself; it maintained diverse contacts, such as Aermacchi-Aeritalia, McDonnell Douglas and Fairchild, with the intention of attracting a partner with whom to share the project.

Although the intention of the air force was to add McDonnell Douglas, which maintained negotiations for a possible license of production of the A-4M Skyhawk II (now, the A-4AR Fightinghawk) and another one of ejection seats for the trainer IA 63 Pampa, but the American company resisted assuming the risk, because its offer of fighters was covered.

Another possibility was explored then with Aeritalia-Aermacchi, but the financial problems that it crossed the country they made finally abandon the project.

== Specifications ==
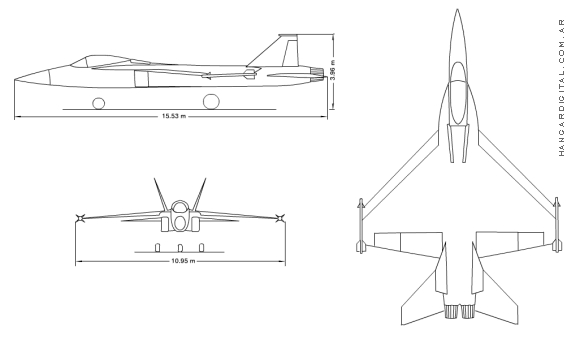
FMA SAIA 90

General characteristics

- Crew: 1 or 2
- Length: 15.53 m (50 ft 11 in)
- Wingspan: 10.95 m (35 ft 11 in)
- Height: 3.96 m (13 ft 0 in)
- Wing area: 30 m^{2} (320 sq ft)
- Empty weight: 7,800 kg (17,196 lb)
- Max takeoff weight: 14,500 kg (31,967 lb)
- Powerplant: 2 × GE F404 afterburning turbofan

Performance

- Maximum speed: Mach 2.25
- Range: 3,380 km (2,100 mi, 1,830 nmi)
- Service ceiling: 15,000 m (49,000 ft)
- Rate of climb: 250 m/s (49,000 ft/min)
- Wing loading: 266.67 kg/m^{2} (54.62 lb/sq ft)

== Gallery ==
Artist drawing of a SAIA-90 flying over El Palomar

Artist drawing of a SAIA-90 flying over Buenos Aires

== See also ==
Related development

- IA 63 Pampa

Aircraft of comparable role, configuration, and era

- General Dynamics F-16 Fighting Falcon
- JF-17 Thunder
- IAI Lavi
- Novi Avion

Related lists

- List of aircraft of the Argentine Air Force
- List of fighter aircraft
