= List of obsolete weapon systems of the South African Air Force =

Various obsolete weapon systems owned and operated by the South African Air Force.

Obsolete weapon systems of the South African Air Force (List Incomplete)
Type	Manufacturer	Model	Country of Origin	Platform
Air to Air Missile	Matra	R.530	France	Mirage F1CZ, Mirage IIICZ
Air to Air Missile	Matra	R.550 Magic-1	France	Mirage F1AZ, Mirage F1CZ, Mirage IIIBZ, Mirage IIICZ, Mirage IIID2Z, Mirage IIIDZ, Mirage IIIEZ, Mirage IIIR2Z, Mirage IIIRZ
Air to Air Missile	Rafael Advanced Defense Systems	Python MK-3	Israel	Cheetah C, D
Air to Air Missile	Raytheon Corp	AIM-9 Sidewinder-9B	United States	CL.13B Sabre Mk 6, Mirage IIICZ, Mirage IIIEZ
Air to Air Missile	Denel Dynamics	R-Darter	South Africa	Cheetah C, Cheetah D
Air to Air Missile	Kentron	V-3B Kukri	South Africa	Mirage F1AZ, Mirage F1CZ, Mirage IIIBZ, Mirage IIICZ, Mirage IIID2Z, Mirage IIIDZ, Mirage IIIEZ, Mirage IIIR2Z, Mirage IIIRZ
Air to Surface Missile	Nord	AS-30	France	Buccaneer S.Mk50, Mirage F1AZ, Mirage IIIEZ
Air to Surface Missile	Nord	AS-20	France	Buccaneer S.Mk50, Mirage F1AZ, Mirage IIIEZ
Air to Surface Missile	Nord	AS-12	France	Cheetah C, D
Guided Bomb	Kentron	Raptor 1 Glide Bomb (H-2)	South Africa	Cheetah D
