= IAI Lavi =

Israeli prototype jet fighter

Lavi
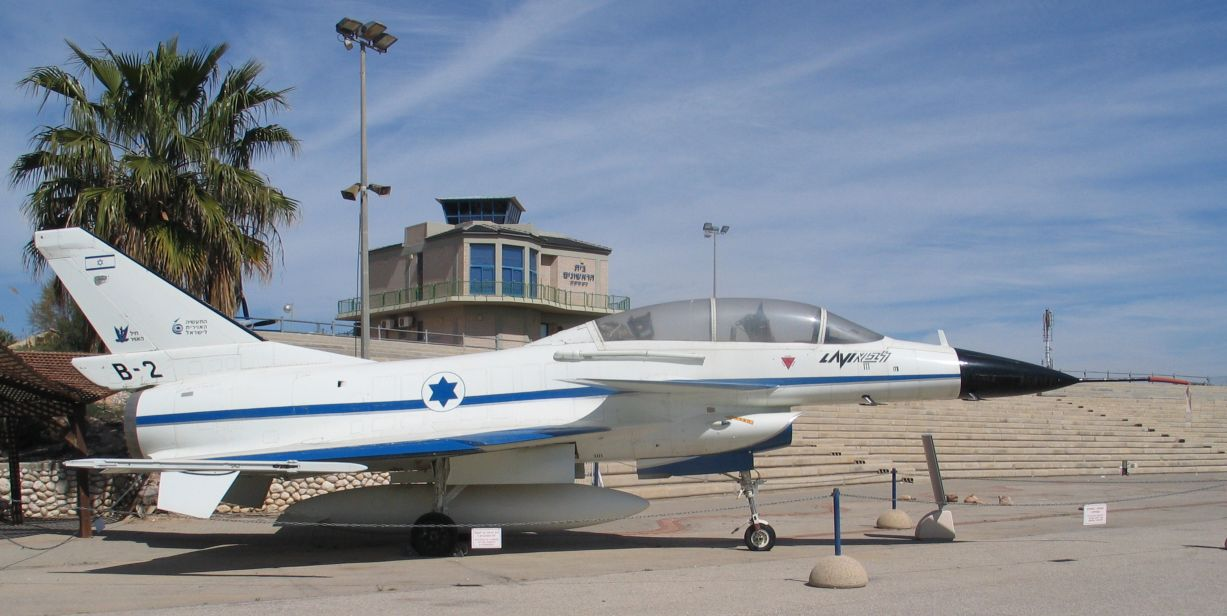
- Lavi B-02 prototype

General information
- Type: Multirole fighter
- Manufacturer: Israel Aircraft Industries
- Status: Canceled in August 1987
- Number built: 3 prototypes

History
- First flight: 31 December 1986

The IAI Lavi (Hebrew: לביא, "lion") is a single-engined fourth-generation multirole jet fighter developed in Israel, by Israel Aircraft Industries (IAI), during the 1980s. The decision to develop the Lavi was controversial, both with the Israeli public, due to the enormous associated costs, and particularly with the U.S. government due to competition with American jets on the export market. By 1984, Israel, with a population of 4 million, had amongst the world's highest military expenditure as a proportion of GDP, at approximately 18.9%, which was considered unsustainable. These issues contributed to the cancellation of development of the aircraft by the Israeli government during the flight-test phase of development in August 1987.

The Israeli cabinet's cancellation of the program at a late stage by a 12–11 vote continued to arouse controversy and bitterness in Israel for decades, with Moshe Arens, the main political figure behind the Lavi project, stating in 2013 that if the project had not been cancelled the IAF "would be operating the world's most advanced fighter, upgraded over the years to incorporate operational experience and newer technology."

The Lavi performed successfully in flight tests, with its flight handling described as "excellent" by test pilots. The Lavi was planned to be the mainstay of the Israeli Air Force, and considerable export sales for the aircraft had been forecast. The design was unique in the combination of a small, aerodynamic, highly maneuverable plane, with sophisticated, software-rich systems, low armed drag due to semi-conformal weapons carriage, and the ability to carry a large payload at high speed and over long distances. As of 2012, two preserved prototypes have been placed on public display.

== Development ==
=== Origins ===
Conceptually, the Lavi had its origins in the idea espoused by IAF commander and Minister of Defence Ezer Weizman that Israel's combat aircraft should fall into 'two-tiers' – a small number of high performance aircraft and a larger bulk with less sophistication and complexity. In the mid-1970s, the plane that was to become the Lavi was meant to be a multirole fighter-bomber to replace elderly IAF aircraft such as the Douglas A-4 Skyhawk and IAI Kfir; however continuous revisions of the proposed aircraft led to the incorporation of more advanced technologies and ideas to produce an ambitious aircraft in the class of the American General Dynamics F-16. The IAF was estimated to have a requirement for 300 aircraft, 60 of which were expected to be combat-capable two-seat trainers.

In February 1980, a milestone towards the development of the Lavi occurred when the Israeli government granted its authorisation for the IAF to present its list of technical specifications and requirements which sought the IAF's envisioned future fighter aircraft. While the Lavi was heavily influenced by these requirements, it was also affected by concepts of the wider strategic situation that Israel was confronted by. Menachem Eine, who headed the Lavi program, concluded that any proposed aircraft would be subject to a substantially greater threat than any envisioned US fighter, and would have to be developed with these threats in mind. Eine observed that the aircraft needed to not only take into consideration the best Soviet armaments that would be potentially faced in combat, but the best American equipment as well, as both Egypt and Saudi Arabia were being supplied with modern American fighter aircraft.

In addition to the primary intention to perform air-to-ground missions, the IAF sought to configure the Lavi to perform various other roles, as Israel perceived the likelihood of a potential sustained conflict under which there would be a need to fight for aerial supremacy against the efforts of multiple neighbouring adversaries to be high. The Lavi was therefore designed to possess both the flight performance and capabilities to perform as an effective supplement to the IAF's own F-15 fleet in carrying out aerial combat missions. As the Lavi was viewed as being relatively easy to fly, the aircraft was also under consideration as an advanced jet trainer as well.

Early on, IAI decided to adopt a delta wing configuration, of which the company was already familiar with through its work on the earlier Kfir, which was paired with large, steerable canards situated forward of the wing. The delta wing arrangement was relatively low-weight, provided space for considerable fuel capacity, a smooth low-altitude flight attitude, and high levels of directional stability while flown at high angles of attack (AOA). The canard generated additional lift and positive control when at high AOAs. While this configuration afforded excellent maneuverability, it also exhibited natural instability during flight. To compensate, the Lavi was fitted with a sophisticated digital fly-by-wire system which allowed the aircraft to take advantage of this particular wing design while eliminating this shortcoming. The Lavi was one of the first aircraft to feature this type of configuration, which has since become more commonplace amongst fighter aircraft.

The adoption of certain components, such as an engine produced by Pratt & Whitney, were viewed as foregone conclusions; the Beit Shemesh engine plant already had an established relationship with the company and planned to co-produce the engine, thus enabling some of the manufacturing to be carried out domestically in Israel. Some elements of the engine had to be manufactured in the US due to some of the design aspects having been classified as secret. The development of the Lavi was viewed by some figures in Israeli military and government circles, most notably Moshe Arens and Shimon Peres, as being an important program to modernise Israeli industry overall and to increase its technical ability, helping the nation progress towards becoming a developed nation.

=== Testing ===
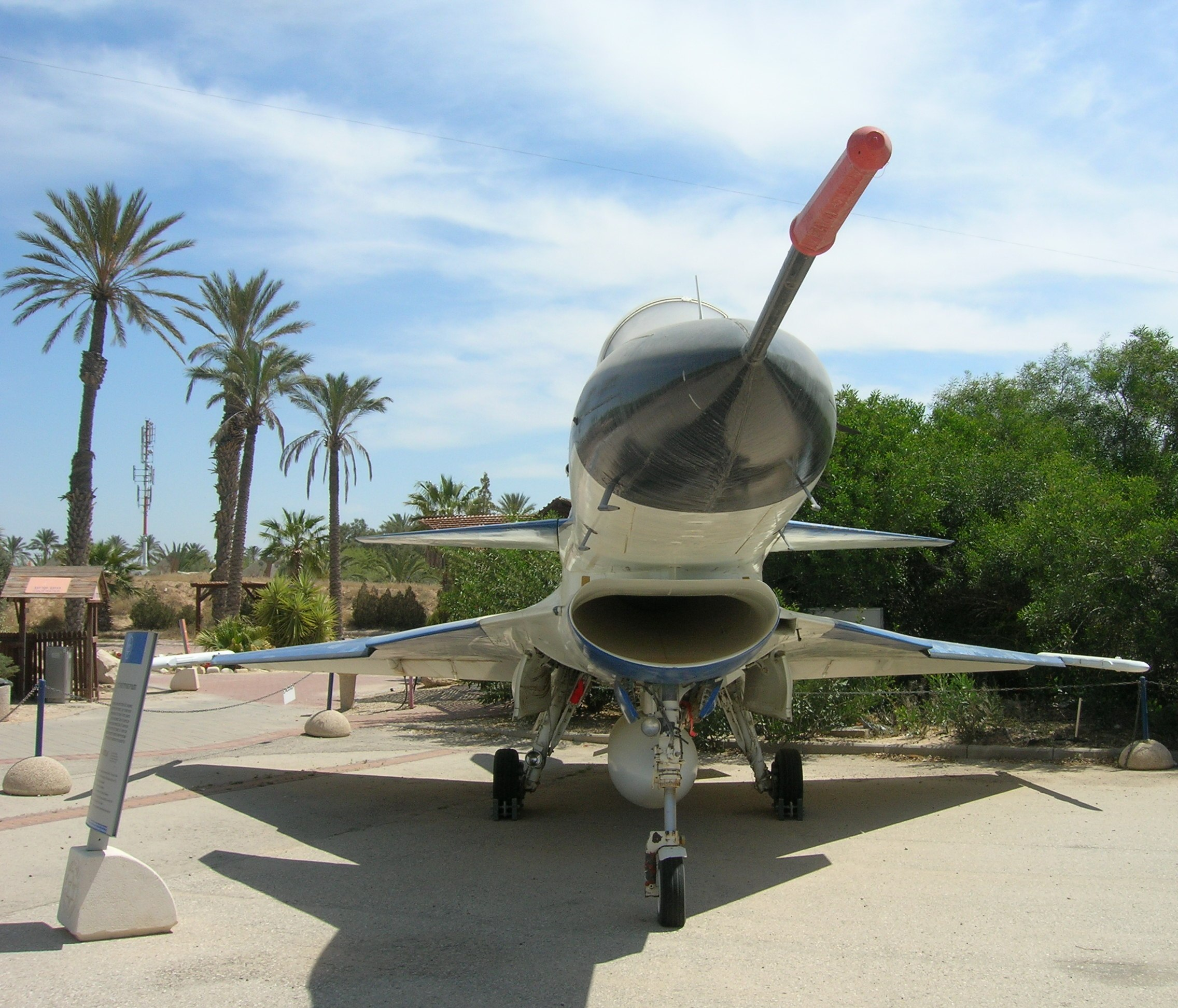
Head-on view of a Lavi prototype

The development program was planned to involve a total of five prototypes of the Lavi being completed, three of which were to have used a two-seat cockpit configuration.

On 31 December 1986, the first prototype took off on its maiden flight. The test pilot, Menachem Shmul, head of IAI's Air Operations section, took off at 13:21 and stayed in the air for 26 minutes, during which he checked the engine and controls. The handling was described as "excellent", with a high degree of stability in crosswind landings. About three months later, a second Lavi prototype took to the air; it featured improvements and additional features over the first, with a belly-mounted fuel tank, a special midair refuelling probe and several new avionic systems. Both B-01 and B-02 were tandem two-seaters, with the rear cockpit occupied by test equipment. By August 1987, the month in which the Lavi was canceled, a total of 82 sorties had reportedly been flown between the two completed prototypes, during which a significant proportion of the flight envelope had been explored.

=== Controversy and cancellation ===
While the Lavi had attracted the steadfast support of IAF veteran and Likud minister Moshe Arens, there was considerable dissent over the development. While the U.S. was a key partner in the aircraft's development, there was vocal political opposition to financing the Lavi, which may have been a competitive aircraft in the export market against American aircraft such as the F-16C/D and the F/A-18C/D. The Lavi would have also required a great deal of other competing military requirements. There were elements of the armed forces that did not support the project and officers who felt that the F-16 possessed similar performance to the Lavi and was readily available already, making the F-16 cheaper and easier to procure. IAF Major General Avihu Ben-Nun argued in favour of canceling the Lavi and acquiring 75 F-16s instead.

"The Lavi is better for security than holding onto the Gaza Strip"

— Israeli Prime Minister Shimon Peres, 18 May 1987

Proponents, such as the Minister without Portfolio Moshe Arens, advocated that the Lavi was a high prestige program, asserting Israeli technological capabilities and would work to the nation's economic advantage. A failure to proceed with the development could lead to significant job losses and possibly contribute to emigration; the Israeli State Comptroller argued the resulting unemployment was negligible. Arens was keen to promote potential partnerships and technology exchanges in regards to the Lavi. Perhaps optimistically, IAI had projected export sales of the Lavi to be as many as 407 units to customers including South Africa, Chile, Taiwan, and Argentina; there were reports of significant South African interest and involvement during the early development of the Lavi. In a later development, however, Israel gave the U.S. explicit guarantees that the Lavi would not be made available to export.

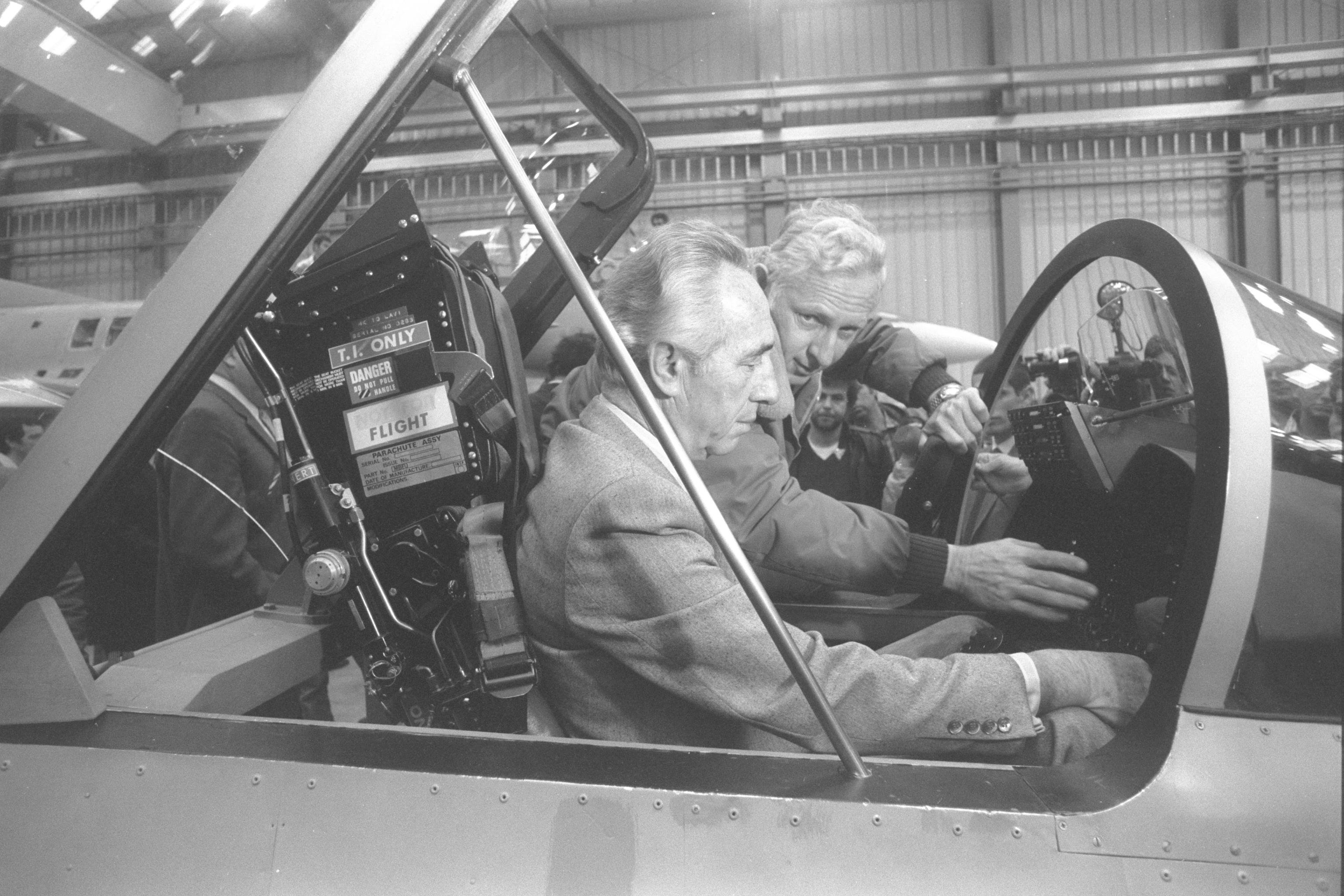
Shimon Peres seated in the cockpit of a mock-up Lavi, August 1985

Prior to and following the cancellation, IAI employees organised numerous demonstrations and public appeals to rally support for the Lavi; public opinion was roughly evenly divided on the subject of the Lavi. In the US, there was considerable opposition to the Lavi program from the Pentagon due to the fear that the heavy financial costs would impair other military capabilities; there were also questions about the financial soundness of the project and that Lavi technologies may be shared with South Africa, which had a history of close military cooperation with Israel. The financial burden of developing the Lavi were such that the Governor of the Bank of Israel, Michael Bruno, publicly stated that Israel could not realistically afford the "luxury of producing fighter-aircraft" and would harm overall economic growth.

On 30 August 1987, Israel's cabinet conducted a decisive vote on whether to continue the development of the Lavi; this development was influenced by considerable lobbying by the U.S., who made several compensatory proposals in exchange for the cancellation. The vote was highly politicised, the Israeli Labor Party ordered its members to vote against the project. The Cabinet rejected the continuation at a margin of 12–11, with one cabinet member abstaining. Following the outcome of the vote, Lavi supporter Moshe Arens offered his resignation, refusing to be associated with the decision to terminate the aircraft. Shortly afterwards, Israel approved the purchase of 90 F-16Cs from the United States, which acted as an effective replacement to the Lavi. It was reported that China and South Africa were interested in continuing with the development of the Lavi.

=== Aftermath and legacy ===
When the Lavi project was canceled in 1987, a total of five airframes had been manufactured. Prototypes B-01 and B-02 had been completed, while B-03, B-04, and B-05 were incomplete. Parts from B-01 and B-02 were pulled to complete B-03. The gutted airframe of B-02 was subsequently placed on static display at the Israeli Air Force museum at Hatzerim Airbase; the remaining units, B-01, B-04 and B-05, were all ultimately scrapped. Two years after the project's cancelation, IAI completed the third Lavi prototype (B-03), which made its first flight on 25 September 1989. B-03 proceeded to serve as a technology demonstrator and as a flying testbed for various internal IAI development projects; the aircraft saw later use as a ground testbed as well.

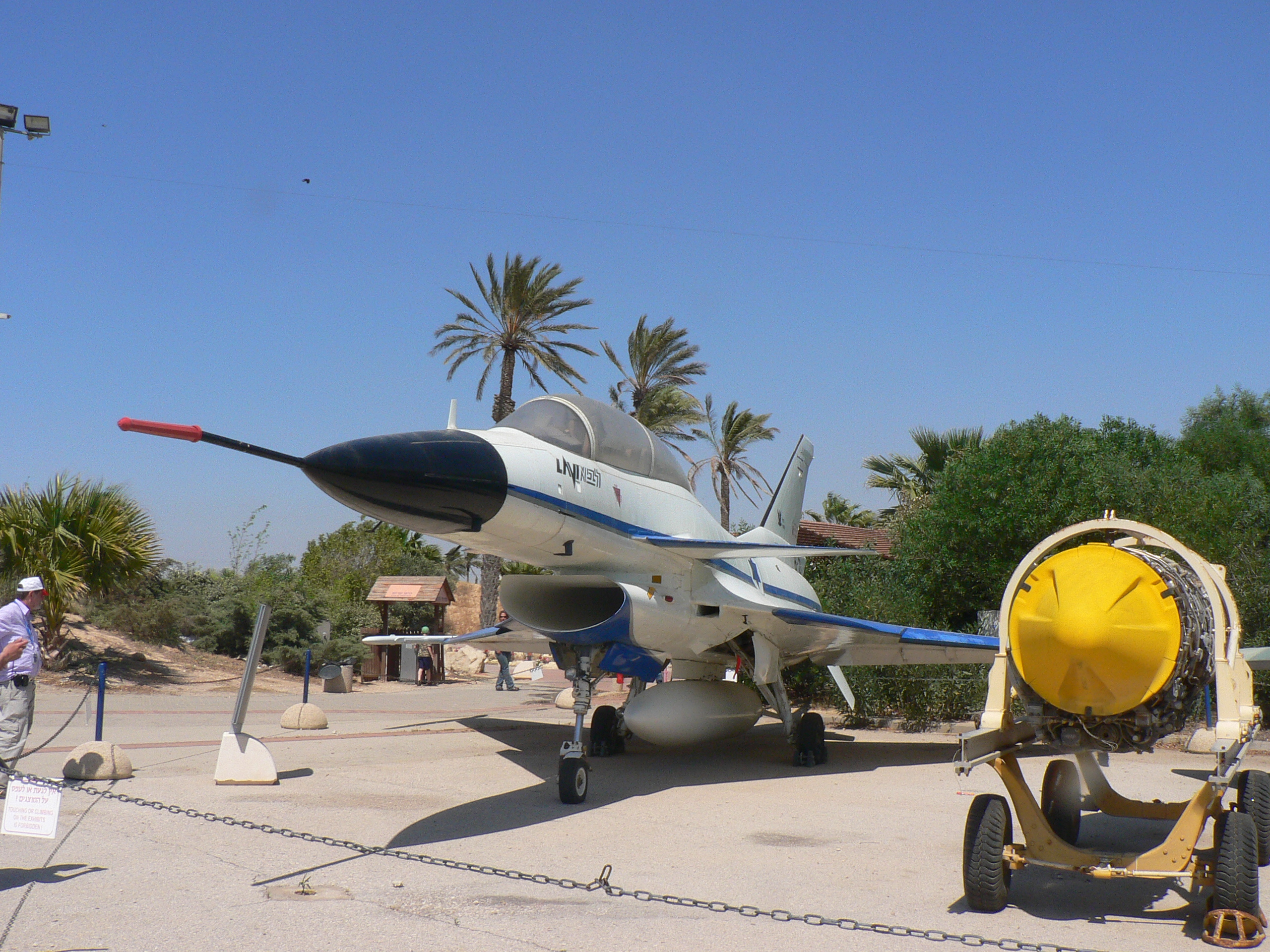
A preserved IAI Lavi being displayed during a celebration of Israel's independence in 2007

While the Lavi project had been terminated without any production aircraft being produced, the development represented an important opportunity to demonstrate and advance the capabilities of Israel's aerospace industry. Many of the aircraft's subsystems, avionics, and components went on to be developed and made commercially available, fueling defense export sales and proving to be a lucrative business in its own right. The EL/M-2032 pulse doppler radar, which had originally been developed for use on the Lavi is one such example; it has since been exported and equipped upon a wide range of operational aircraft.

Despite the Lavi's cancellation, the investment in its development had significant results. The technological knowledge accumulated during the development contributed to the achievement of Israel's first launch of a satellite into space in 1988. It resulted in a new level in avionics systems, and contributed to Israel's high-tech boom of the 1990s by releasing into the economy the technological talents of around 5,000 Israeli scientists and engineers who had been employed on this one project; many, for example, were reemployed on the Arrow anti-ballistic missile program.

In July 2013, the IAF announced that the Alenia Aermacchi M-346 Master, an advanced trainer aircraft that it was in the process of procuring at the time, would receive the name Lavi in Israeli service; a total of 30 M-346s are to be operated by the service from 2014.

=== China question ===
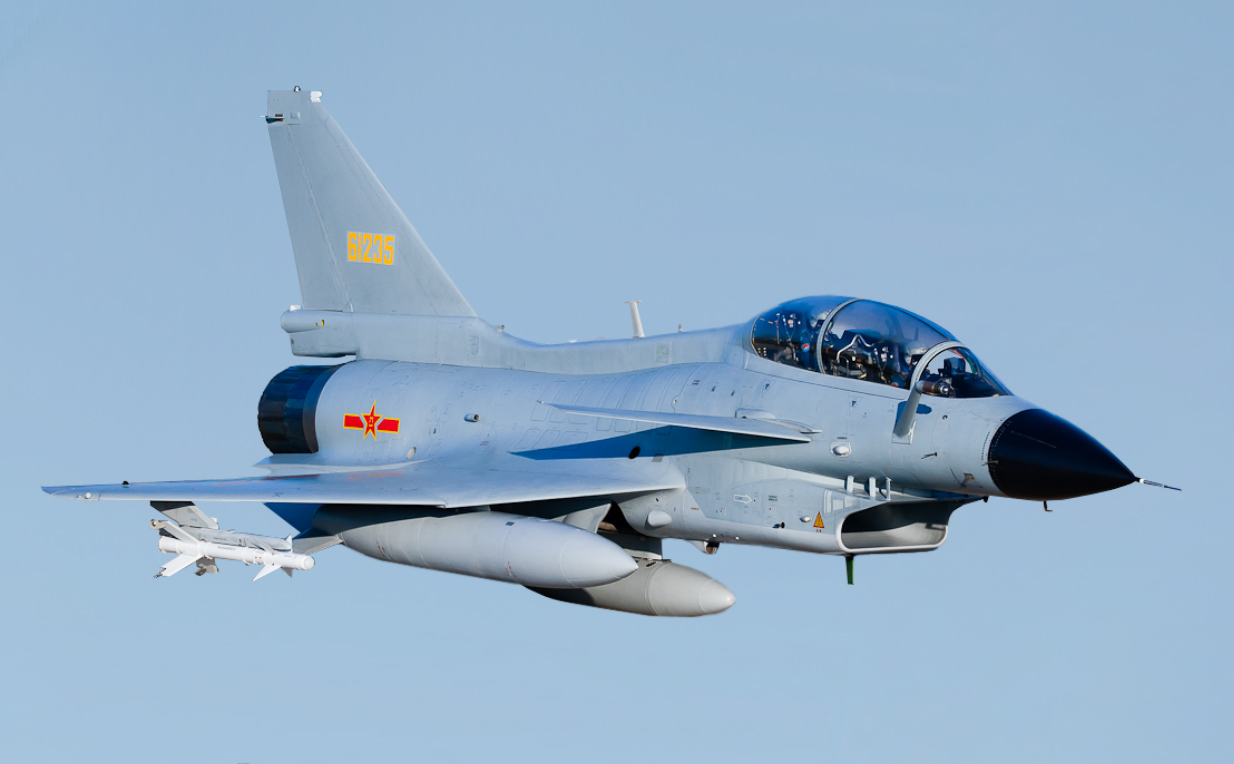
The Chengdu J-10, featuring a very comparable configuration to the Lavi and having a disputed association to the Israeli development.

In 2008, aviation publishing house Jane's alleged that China's development of the Chengdu J-10 had benefited from technical information from the Lavi project, citing Russian engineers who claim to have heard this from Chinese colleagues. In 2007, the J-10's designer, Song Wencong (宋文骢), denied any connection with the Lavi, pointing to similarities with the Chengdu J-9 developed in the 1960s. This was echoed by PLAAF major Zhang Weigang in a 2012 interview. There have been no public statements or formal claims along those lines; by 2000, however, advanced technology transfer to China of any origin had become anathema to the US, which forced Israel to cancel a sale of Phalcon airborne early warning planes.

== Design ==
=== Overview ===
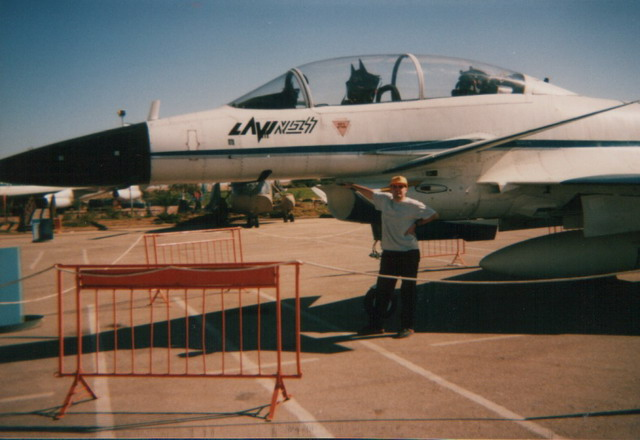
Forward fuselage of an IAI Lavi

The IAI Lavi was a single-seat, single-engine multirole fighter aircraft, principally designed to conduct high-speed penetration and first-pass bombing missions while maintaining a high level of manoeuvrability and survivability. The Lavi was almost 1,300 kg lighter in empty weight than its contemporary F-16 block 30 (7,030 vs 8,300 kg).

It was envisioned that the Lavi's lifecycle costs would be considerably beneath those of the F-16. Efforts were also made to achieve a lower procurement cost as well. Like the F-16, the Lavi was an aerodynamically unstable aircraft, employing a quadruplex-redundant digital fly-by-wire system in order to provide stability and control; this was one of the aircraft's more innovative features.

The Lavi was powered by a single Pratt & Whitney PW1120 turbofan engine, capable of generating 20,260 lb of thrust and enabling the aircraft to attain a maximum speed of Mach 1.85. The engine, which was derived from the Pratt & Whitney F100 that powered the F-16, was the only aspect of the aircraft that Eine acknowledged to have created a dependency upon the US. While carrying eight 750 lb bombs the Lavi possessed a combat radius of 250 nmi; an alternative armament of 2,000 lb bombs enabled a 650 nmi combat radius. Possessing a 1.1:1 thrust-to-weight ratio while equipped with a combat payload, the airframe of the Lavi was designed to be capable of routinely withstanding up to 9g.

=== Airframe ===
The Lavi employed a mainly traditional airframe, the majority of development focus being upon the avionics and systems to provide the aircraft's performance edge instead. In order to meet the low structural weight requirements imposed, the use of composite materials was employed in elements such as the wing and its substructure, as well as the fin and the skin. The forward fuselage was shaped in a manner that resulted in it naturally directing air into the engine intake and to avoid inlet blanking while flown at a sideslip condition.

=== Avionics ===
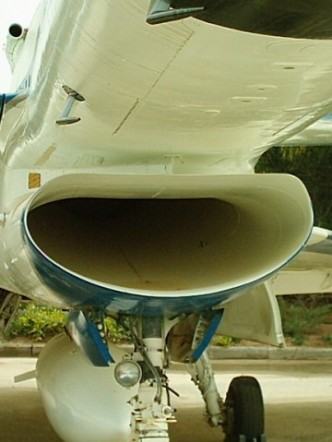
Closeup view of the Lavi's supersonic air intake with splitter plate

According to Eine, the Lavi's main area of advancement over its contemporaries was the level of integration of avionics and onboard electronics; it was claimed that the Lavi was "more computerised than any other system in the world". A key innovation was the use of a quadruplex-redundant digital fly-by-wire flight control system, which was co-developed by Lear Siegler and IAI. If it had been brought into service, the Lavi may have become the first operational aircraft to employ fully digital flight controls.

IAI subsidiary Elta held responsibility for the electronic warfare self-protection systems. These are claimed to have been capable of rapid threat identification and automated response, incorporating a suite of active and passive countermeasures, such as power-managed noise and deception jamming systems. Both podded and internal countermeasures were to be used. Elta also developed the EL/M-2032 Doppler multi-mode radar for the Lavi, which was equipped with a programmable signal processor and was capable of various air-to-air and air-to-ground modes, including high-resolution mapping, terrain avoidance, and look-down/shoot-down functionality.

== Specifications (Lavi) ==
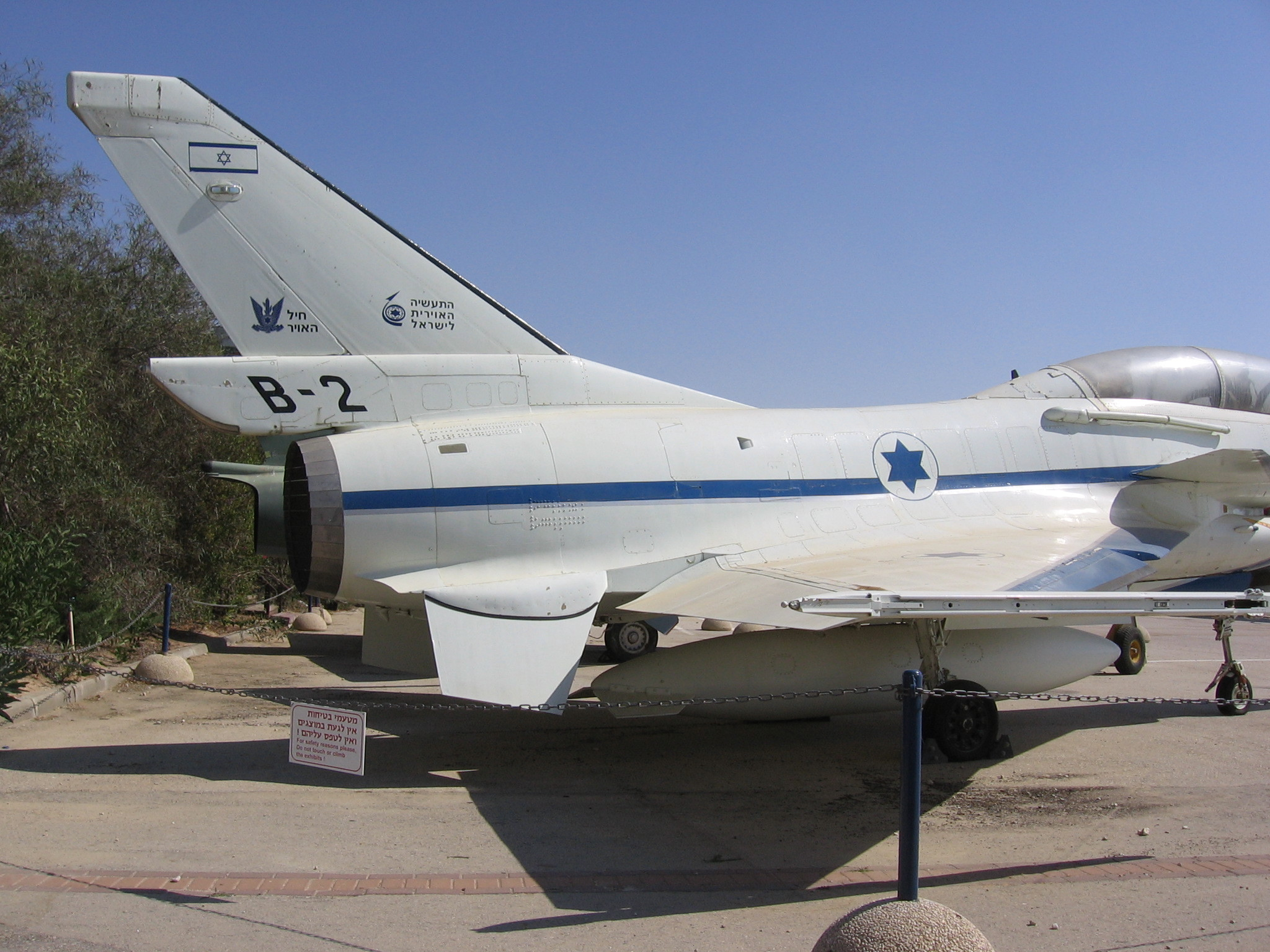
IAI Lavi on display in Beer-Sheva

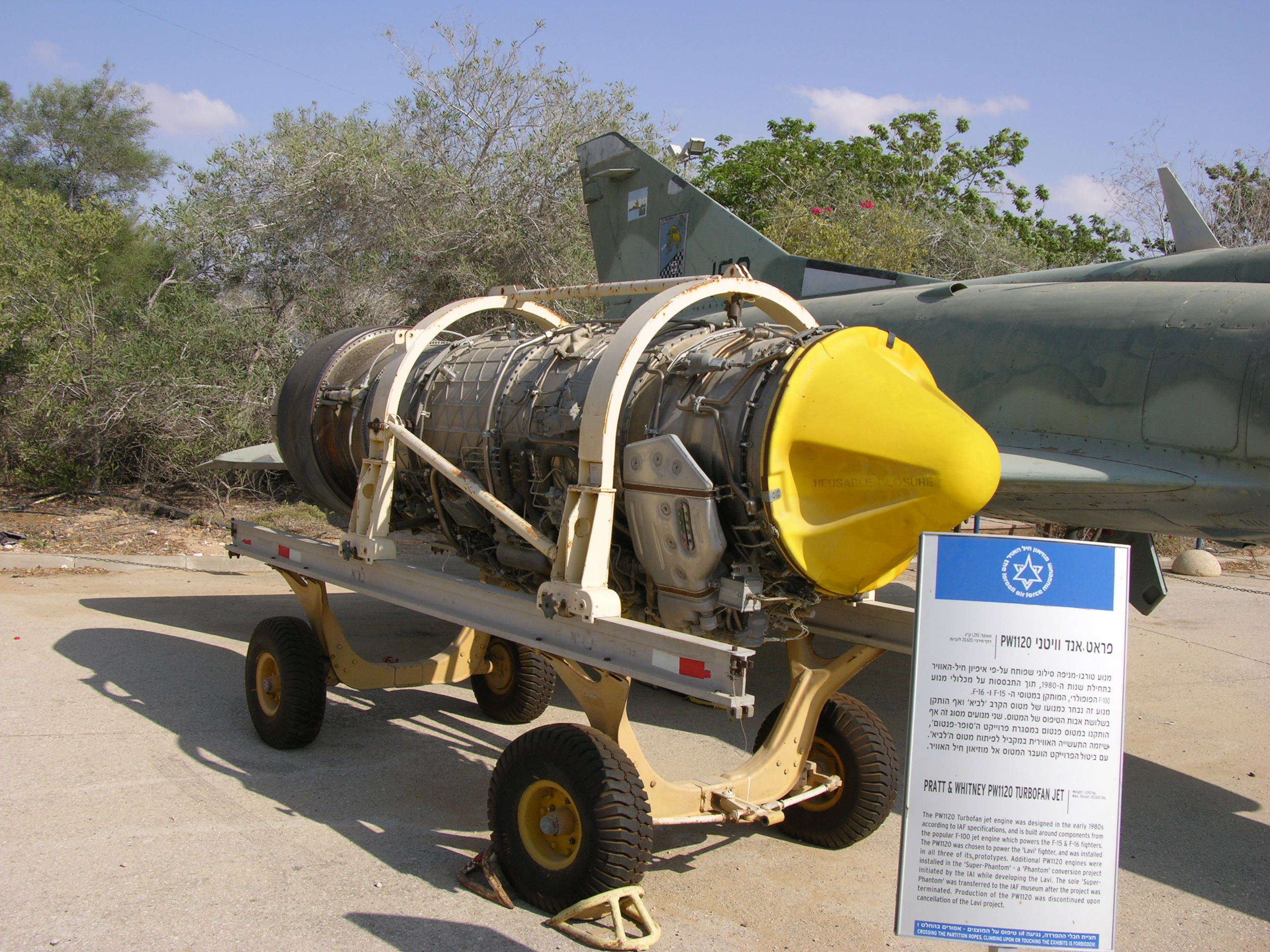
Pratt & Whitney PW1120 turbojet engine

Data from Wilson

General characteristics

- Crew: 1
- Length: 14.57 m (47 ft 10 in)
- Wingspan: 8.78 m (28 ft 10 in)
- Height: 4.78 m (15 ft 8 in)
- Wing area: 33 m^{2} (360 sq ft)
- Empty weight: 7,031 kg (15,501 lb)
- Gross weight: 9,991 kg (22,026 lb)
- Max takeoff weight: 19,277 kg (42,499 lb)
- Powerplant: 1 × Pratt & Whitney PW1120 afterburning turbofan, 91.5 kN (20,600 lbf) with afterburner

Performance

- Maximum speed: 1,912 km/h (1,188 mph, 1,032 kn) at 11,000 m (36,000 ft)
- Maximum speed: Mach 1.8 at 11,000 m (36,000 ft)
- Range: 3,700 km (2,300 mi, 2,000 nmi)
- Service ceiling: 15,240 m (50,000 ft)
- Rate of climb: 254 m/s (50,000 ft/min)
- Wing loading: 303.2 kg/m^{2} (62.1 lb/sq ft)
- Thrust/weight: 0.94

Armament

- Guns: 1 × 30 mm DEFA cannon

== See also ==
Aircraft of comparable role, configuration, and era

- CAC/PAC JF-17 Thunder
- Chengdu J-10
- Dassault Rafale
- Eurofighter Typhoon
- General Dynamics F-16 Fighting Falcon
- General Dynamics F-16XL
- HAL Tejas
- AIDC F-CK-1 Ching-kuo
- Mitsubishi F-2
- Novi Avion
- Saab JAS 39 Gripen
