= 701st Aviation Brigade =

701st Aviation Brigade: 701. avijacijska brigada
- Active: 1988 - 1990
- Disbanded: December,1990
- Country: Yugoslavia
- Branch: Yugoslav Air Force
- Size: 3 aviation squadrons
- Part of: 1st Corps of Air Force and Air Defense
- Garrison/HQ: Tuzla Air Base

Commanders
- Current commander: Milan Lakićević

The 701st Aviation Brigade (Serbo-Croatian: 701. avijacijska brigada / 701. авијацијска бригада) was an aviation brigade established in 1988 as part of the SFR Yugoslav Air Force. The brigade command was stationed at Tuzla Air Base until it was disbanded in 1990.

== History ==
The 701st Aviation Brigade was formed on August 15, 1988, with command at Tuzla Air Base as part of 1st Corps of Air Force and Air Defense. After its formation, the brigade consisted of 245th and 252nd Fighter-Bomber Aviation Squadrons based at Mostar and Batajnica Air Bases and 350th Reconnaissance Aviation Squadron from Tuzla. The formation of brigade was not completed, and two new helicopter squadrons, 721st Anti-Armored Helicopter Squadron and 792nd Transport Helicopter Squadron were planned to be formed as part of brigade, while 462nd Light Combat Aviation Squadron had to become 253rd Fighter-Bomber Aviation Squadron. The brigade was supposed to continue the tradition of 554th Assault Aviation Regiment. Further development of the brigade has been suspended and it was disbanded in July 1990.

== Assignments ==
- 1st Corps of Air Force and Air Defense (1988–1990)

== Structure ==
- 701st Aviation Brigade
  - 245th Fighter-Bomber Aviation Squadron
  - 252nd Fighter-Bomber Aviation Squadron
  - 350th Reconnaissance Aviation Squadron

== Commanding officers ==
Date appointed	Name
1988	Milan Lakićević

== Equipment ==
- G-2 Galeb
- G-4 Super Galeb
- J-21 Jastreb
- IJ-21 Jastreb
- INJ-22 Orao
- Utva 66
