= Aerosvet =

- Frequency: Bimonthly
- Founded: 1985
- Company: Aeronautical Union of Vojvodina; NIŠRO "Dnevnik"
- Country: Yugoslavia
- Based in: Novi Sad
- Language: Serbian

Aerosvet was an aviation magazine published by the Aeronautical Union of Vojvodina, Yugoslavia. The magazine was started in 1985 and published on a bimonthly basis. It was successor of another Yugoslavian aviation magazine with the same name that existed during the 1950s and published in Belgrade.

Aerosvet had an English-language sister publication, Aerosvet International, that was published four times annually.

== See also ==
- Yugoslav Air Force
- Glasnik RV i PVO
- Krila Armije
