= 350th Reconnaissance Aviation Squadron =

350th Reconnaissance Aviation Squadron: 350. izviđačka avijacijska eskadrila
- Active: 1961 – 1990
- Disbanded: 1990
- Country: Yugoslavia
- Branch: Yugoslav Air Force
- Type: Squadron
- Role: Reconnaissance
- Part of: 701st Aviation Brigade
- Garrison/HQ: Tuzla Air Base

The 350th Reconnaissance Aviation Squadron (Serbo-Croatian: 350. izviđačka avijacijska eskadrila / 350. извиђачка авијацијска ескадрила) was an aviation squadron of Yugoslav Air Force established in April 1961 at Tuzla military air base.

== History ==
Squadron was formed as part of 103rd Reconnaissance Aviation Regiment equipped with US-made Lockheed RT/IT-33A Shooting Star jet-trainer aircraft equipped for aerial reconnaissance. In 1974 Shooting Stars were replaced with new domestic-made Soko Jastreb light-attack jet aircraft in IJ-21 reconnaissance version. In 1988 several Orao INJ-22 reconnaissance aircraft were introduced.

It was disbanded in 1990 with 701st Air Base.

== Assignments ==
- 103rd Reconnaissance Aviation Regiment (1961-1966)
- 98th Aviation Brigade (1966-1978)
- 1st Aviation Corps (1978-1982)
- 98th Aviation Brigade (1982-1985)
- 1st Corps of Air Force and Air Defense (1986-1988)
- 701st Aviation Brigade (1988-1990)

== Bases stationed ==
- Tuzla Air Base (1961-1990)

== Equipment ==
- Lockheed RT/IT-33A Shooting Star (1961–1974)
- Soko IJ-21 Jastreb (1974–1990)
- Soko INJ-22 Orao (1988–1990)
