= 11th Air Defense Division =

11th Air Defense Division: 11. divizija protivvazdušne odbrane
- Active: 1964–1986
- Disbanded: 1986
- Country: Yugoslavia
- Branch: Yugoslav Air Force
- Type: Division
- Size: 5 regiments
- HQ: Belgrade, Banjica

The 11th Air Defense Division (Serbo-Croatian: 11. divizija protivvazdušne odbrane/ 11. дивизија противваздушне одбране) was an air defense division established in 1964
1st Air Defense Zone (Serbo-Croatian: 1. zona protivvazdušne odbrane / 1. зона противваздушне одбране).

== History ==
The 1st Air Defense Zone was formed in 1964, and it was reorganized into 11th Air Defense Division on July 25, 1966. The divisions command was at Belgrade - Banjica. Its task was aerial defense of eastern part of the airspace of Yugoslavia. It has consisted from five regiments, two fighter aviation regiments, two rocket air defense regiments and one air reconnaissance regiment, and other smaller units. It was disbanded on February 28, 1986, when its command was reorganized into command of 1st Corps of Air Force and Air Defense.

== Assignments ==
- Command of Yugoslav Air Force (1964-1978)
- 1st Aviation Corps (1978–1986)

== Previous designations ==
- 1st Air Defense Zone (1964-1966)
- 11th Air Defense Division (1966-1986)

== Organization ==
- 83rd Fighter Aviation Regiment
- 204th Fighter Aviation Regiment
- 250th Air Defense Missile Regiment
- 450th Air Defense Missile Regiment
- 1st Air Reconnaissance Regiment
- 210th Signal Battalion

== Commanding officers ==
Date appointed	Name
July 25, 1966	Ljubiša Ćurguz
August 1968	Stevan Roglić
June 29, 1970	Bojan Savnik
September 1971	Radovan Srećković
June 26, 1972	Ismet Kulenović
September 27, 1976	Aleksa Ristić
October 1979	Branko Gajević
September 7, 1981	Božidar Stefanović
