= 1st Corps of Air Force and Air Defense =

3rd Corps of Air Force and Air Defense: 1. korpus ratnog vazduhoplovstva i protivvazdušne odbrane
- Active: 1986–1992
- Disbanded: 1992
- Country: Yugoslavia
- Branch: Yugoslav Air Force
- Type: Corps
- Size: regiments
- HQ: Banjica

The 1st Corps of Air Force and Air Defense (Serbo-Croatian: 1. korpus ratnog vazduhoplovstva i protivvazdušne odbrane/ 1. корпус ратног ваздухопловства и противваздушне одбране) was a joint unit of Yugoslav Air Force established in 1986.

== History ==
The 1st Corps of Air Force and Air Defense was formed on February 28, 1986, by order to organize three corps of Air Force and Air Defense. It was created by reorganization of 11th Air Defense Division. The corps area of responsibility was central of Yugoslavia. Its aviation units were based at Batajnica, Tuzla, Rajlovac, Mostar, Divulje and partly Zemunik military airports.

Units of 1st Corps of Air Force and Air Defense have participated in combat operations since end of June 1991. During May 1992 most of its units located at territory of Croatia and Bosnia and Herzegovina have been dislocated to territory of Serbia and Montenegro.

By June 1992 the 1st Corps of Air Force and Air Defense has been disbanded, and its command was reorganized into command of Air Defense Corps of newly formed Air Force of Federal Republic of Yugoslavia.

The commander of corps was general Božidar Stefanović.

== Assignments ==
- Command of Yugoslav Air Force (1986–1992)

== Organization ==
=== 1986-1988 ===
- 1st Corps of Air Force and Air Defense
    - 210th Signal Battalion
    - 252nd Fighter-Bomber Aviation Squadron
    - 350th Reconnaissance Aviation Squadron
  - 1st Air Reconnaissance Regiment
  - 250th Air Defense Missile Regiment
  - 97th Aviation Brigade
  - 204th Fighter Aviation Regiment
  - 130th Air Base
  - 171st Air Base
  - 177st Air Base
  - 399th Air Base
  - 423th Air Base
  - 500th Air Base

=== 1988-1992 ===
- 1st Corps of Air Force and Air Defense
    - 210th Signal Battalion
  - 1st Air Reconnaissance Regiment
  - 250th Air Defense Missile Regiment
  - 97th Aviation Brigade
  - 204th Fighter Aviation Regiment
  - 701st Aviation Brigade (until 1990)
  - 130th Air Base
  - 171st Air Base
  - 177st Air Base
  - 399th Air Base
  - 423th Air Base
  - 500th Air Base

== Headquarters ==
- Banjica (1986–1992)

== Commanding officers ==
Date appointed	Name
1986–1992	general Božidar Stefanović
