= 252nd Training Squadron =

- 252. школско-тренажна авијацијска ескадрила
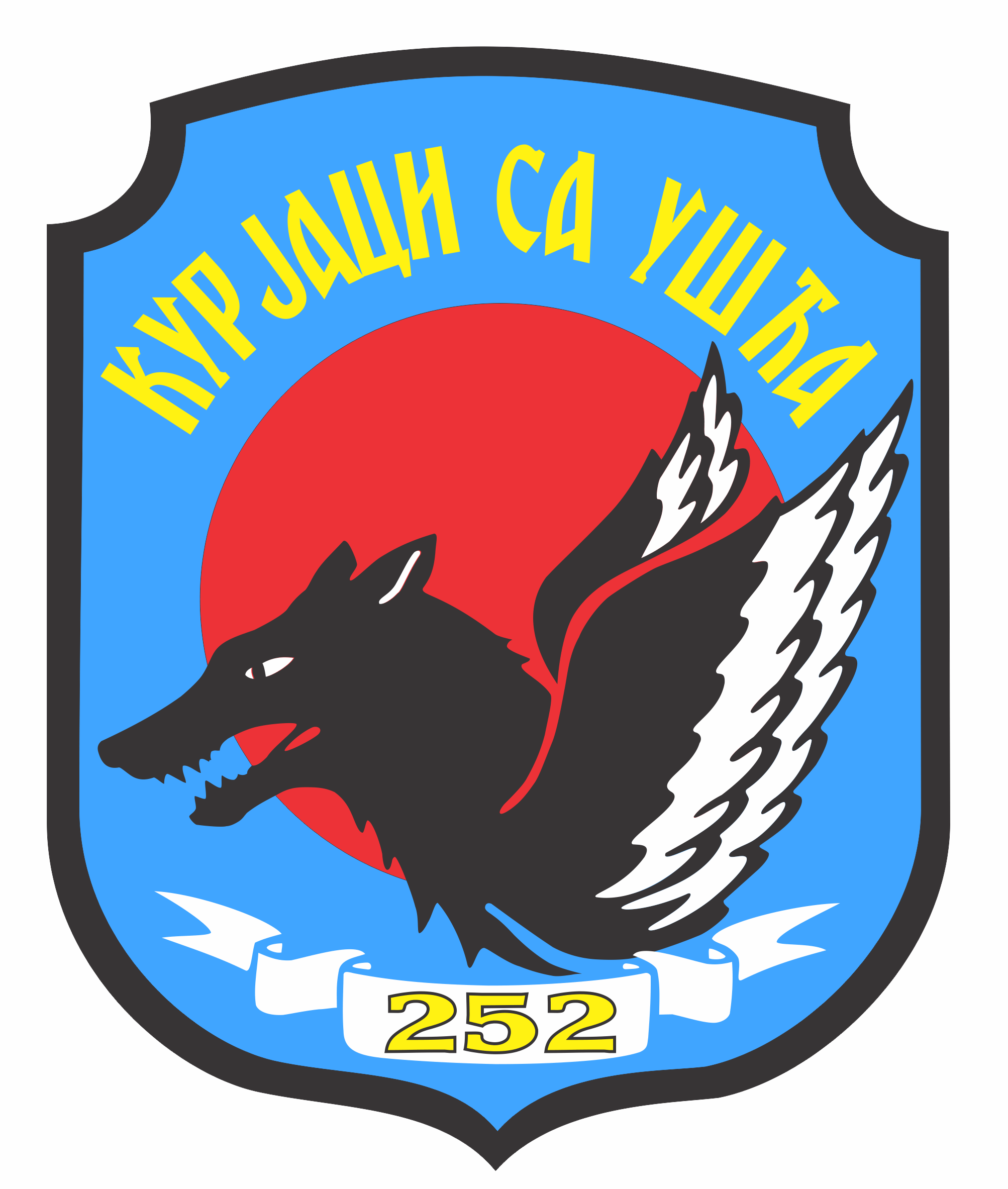
- Active: 1967 – present
- Country: Serbia
- Branch: Serbian Air Force and Air Defence
- Type: Flying squadron
- Role: Training
- Part of: 204th Air Brigade
- Garrison/HQ: Batajnica Air Base
- Nicknames: Ušće Wolves (Kurjaci sa Ušća)
- Engagements: Yugoslav Wars

Commanders
- Current commander: Lieutenant Colonel Boško Šerbedžija

The 252nd Training Squadron "Ušće Wolves" (Serbian: 252. школско-тренажна авијацијска ескадрила "Курјаци са Ушћа", romanized: 252. školsko-trenažna avijacijska eskadrila "Kurjaci sa Ušća") is a squadron of the 204th Air Brigade of the Serbian Air Force and based at Batajnica Air Base.

== History ==
=== 525th Training Squadron ===
The 525th Training Squadron was formed on July 17, 1967, at Batajnica Air Base. The first squadron commander was Major Aleksandar Veselinović. Squadron was equipped with four Republic F-84G Thunderjets, one training TV-2 and ten Kurir liaison aircraft. The main task of squadron was flight training of pilots from Yugoslav Air Force Command, Military Academy, Area flight control and General Inspection of Yugoslav People's Army. By the order of Yugoslav Air Force Command, the squadron was also transporting messengers.

Because the aircraft of the 525th Squadron were old and partly withdrawn, some of flight and maintenance personnel were sent to Zemunik Air Base for retraining for new aircraft type, G-2 Galeb. The retraining was finished in about 20 days, and personnel returned to Batajnica with four new Galeb aircraft. So after January 1968 the squadron comprised two reinforced flights, one with G-2 and one with Kurir aircraft. In the same year the squadron got a new task, pulling the targets for air defense training. The T-33A and TV-2 aircraft converted for that task were located at Skopski Petrovec, Mostar and Cerklje airbases so the squadron members had to go to those airports.

During the Soviet invasion of Czechoslovakia squadron increased combat readiness, by the taskforce "Avala" and assignment to 11th Air Defense Division. As the crisis ended, the squadron was back to normal.

By the early 1970s the squadron got a few more new G-2 aircraft, which were flying with American-made T-33s, which have come to the squadron from various sides in middle of 1971. In December 1972 the four new ground-attack J-21 Jastreb aircraft came from the SOKO factory at Mostar. In that period pilots of the squadron had about 80 to 4 flight hours. By the 1972 the squadron has received Utva 66 for training of pilots from Reserve Officers School. In 1975 the squadron flew aircraft for the Libyan Air Force for the first time, from Mostar, via Dubrovnik, Brindisi, Palermo and Tripol to Misurata. In 1977 squadron had made five flights to Libya, receiving awards from SOKO factory. In 1977 eight TT-33A aircraft were bought from France and converted at Aeronautical Plant "Zmaj" for pulling the targets. They were used until 1983.

In 1982 the squadron received the first G-4 Super Galeb aircraft known extended party of prototypes. From six G-4s four were converted at Aeronautical Plant "Zmaj" for pulling the targets, so known under designation N-62T, while other two aircraft were in standard trainer/light attack configuration, like the rest of the produced Super Galebs. In September 1983, all six G-4 aircraft were relocated to Skopski Petrovac Air Base where they have formed Mixed Aviation Group together with seven Orao aircraft from 353rd Reconnaissance Aviation Squadron of 97th Aviation Brigade. Group was formed to demonstrate these two aircraft types in combat at Joint exercise "Jedinstvo-83". In 1984 pilots of squadron had flown eight G-2 aircraft to Libya from Mostar in formation with Yak-40. Six Super Galeb aircraft from 525th Squadron with six G-4s from 229th Fighter-Bomber Aviation Squadron participated at May Day 1985 parade by flying in formation. By the end of 1986, the squadron was reinforced with four new G-4s, what has a strong impulse to the development of a squadron, due the first Super Galebs from extended party of prototypes were not armed with cannons and rockets, as they were presented on "Jedinstvo-83" exercise.

=== 252nd Fighter-Bomber Aviation Squadron ===
In September 1987, the squadron was renamed 252nd Fighter-Bomber Aviation Squadron, as it has become part of the 701st Aviation Brigade, together with 245th Fighter-Bomber Aviation Squadron and 350th Reconnaissance Aviation Squadron. By July 1990, the 701st Aviation Brigade was disbanded, and the squadron had become part of 97th Aviation Brigade. In that period the squadron got the nickname "Wolves" (Kurjaci).

==== War in Slovenia ====
On June 21, 1991, six pilots from squadron with four pilots of Montenegrin Territorial Defense were transported with helicopters to Brnik airport, which was first secured with 63rd Parachute Brigade inside, and military police troops from outside. They have flown J-20 Kraguj aircraft of Slovenian Territorial Defense to Cerklje Air Base, and later to Batajnica, leaving Slovenian TO without aircraft. As the war in Slovenia has started, by the order of 1st Corps of Air Force and Air Defense, squadron was relocated to Mahovljani Air Base at Banja Luka. Although the 82nd Aviation Brigade, which had aerial support as main task, was still in Slovenia, it couldn't be engaged because it broke on national lines, so the 252nd Squadron, whose personal in 1991 was 90% of Serbian nationality, so it was capable to give aerial support to Yugoslav People's Army units in Slovenia. Squadron has made its first combat operations from Mahovljani Air Base. The most important operation was on June 30, protecting withdrawn of the 82nd Aviation Brigade, when members of squadron had several air strikes on Slovenian TO forces barricades. On July 30, Croatian police in Kostajnica has open fire on aircraft on reconnaissance mission, and Squadron "Kurjaci" has responded by attacking their positions, causing them huge losses. By returning from Banja Luka to Batajnica on August 11, squadron has handed Mahovljani Air Base to 238th Fighter-Bomber Aviation Squadron, relocated from Cerklje.

==== War in Croatia ====
The war in Croatia spread, but in first period Air Force received an order from General Staff of Yugoslav Pepople's Army not to respond to fire from ground. On July 9, one G-4 has flown over Croatian National Guard barracks, and Croatian forces have open fire on aircraft, on what aircraft has respond with gunfire. Four days later, aircraft have attacked silo near Vukovar for two times after Croats have fired three rockets from there. The conflict became more serious. On July 16, Croat forces have fired MANPAD on a G-4, showing that they have modern and effective air defense weapons, but pilot has managed to avoid missile with maneuver. The most serious incident from this phase of war in Croatia was on July 22, when Croatian forces were attacking Mirkovci village. Croats have at 14.pm lightly damaged two Jastrebs on reconnaissance mission, and later, at 5 pm, they have again attacked another pair of a G-2 Jastreb, this time from Croatian barracks near Novi Čankovac. One Jastreb responded firing one rocket, destroying the whole base. What is unknown is that the pilot destroying the Croat base half year later was killed because of that.

The squadron again attacked Croat forces, when on July 27 the Croatian Guard and police opened fire on aircraft, which responded destroying two ammunition warehouse. In later period squadron was most engaged on reconnaissance missions and escort of withdrawing ground troops. On August 17, by order of 5th Corps of Air Force and Air Defense, squadron conducted attack Stara Gradiška prison, which was later used by Banja Luka Corps. On 24 August squadron lost first aircraft in combat, which was hit by two 30mm guns located near one silo, in region of Vukovar. Pilot has successfully ejected and landed with parachute, and transported by local Serb villagers to nearest settlement where he was transported by Mi-8 helicopter back to Batajnica Air Base. Combat operations were continued in rest of August, attacking Croatian Guard barracks in Eastern Slavnoia. In attack on Opatovac farm and Bršadin silo, squadron for first time acted jointly with fighter aircraft from 204th Fighter Aviation Regiment.

By September the squadron continued combat actions joined Yugoslav People's Army units in battle of Vukovar, by attacking positions around brickyard, silo, water tower, among other. These operations were encrypted as "Vesna" and "Jesen". Squadron was stroking later in cooperation with 204th Fighter Regiment. Since the beginning of war, squadron had 989 attacks on 349 objects, 6 lost aircraft and 20 damaged. Three pilots who were shot down and injured and one pilot who destroyed Croatian barracks in Novi Čakovci were awarded with The Medal of Bravery. At spring 1992 part of squadron was based at Udbina Air Base for two months, where it has replaced 105th Aviation Regiment, where from it had mission to support Yugoslav People's Army troops near Kupres. In that period squadron was reinforced with some G-2 and G-4 aircraft from disbanded 249th Squadron, which was at Udbina Air Base. It had combat operation again at 27 March when Croat forces invaded Bosnia and Herzegovina. Squadron was also engaged on protection of Yugoslav Army convoys withdrawing from Bosnia-Herzegovina. Another Jastreb was shot down near Bosanski Brod and pilot has died in crash.

==== Reorganization ====
In May 1992, Yugoslav People's Army was officially dissolved, and 252nd Squadron became part of "new" Air Force of Federal Republic of Yugoslavia. In this period a lot of pilots and aircraft from disbanded squadrons have arrived to squadron. There were 17 Super Galebs, 12 Jastebs, 14 Galebs and some Kraguj and Utva 66 aircraft, total 57 aircraft. Some of them have been based at Kovin and Sombor airports. By August 1992 squadron has become part of 204th Aviation Brigade, with 126th and 127th Fighter Squadrons and 352nd Reconnaissance Squadron. In this period squadron had a lot of joint exercises with fighter squadrons, which took about 40 aircraft, G-4s with mission to attack enemy airfield, MiG-29s as fighter protection for Super Galebs and MiG-21s as interceptors, trying to stop attack. In 1993 bad economical situation in country reflected of Air Force too, so pilots had some 50–60 hours of flight unlike before war when they had up to 100 hours. Due to the reorganization of the Air Force, squadron has become part of 98th Aviation Brigade (since 1997 Fighter-Bomber Aviation Regiment) with command at Lađevci Air Base. By 1994 Jastreb aircraft are being withdrawn while some G-4 were transferred from 172nd Aviation Brigade. In 1996, the squadron was equipped with ten standard G-4 aircraft and five N-62T. Since September 1997 the squadron is equipped with Orao aircraft from 242nd Squadron, while seven standard Super Galebs were given to 242nd Squadron, so squadron then had nine J-22 Orao attack aircraft, six NJ-22 two-seat Oraos, five N-62T and three standard G-4s and one Utva 75.

==== Kosovo War and NATO bombing ====
As a result of the bad political situation in 1998, and possible risk of NATO's aggression on FRY, on October 2 the squadron was relocated to Ponikve airport for 12 days and later returned to Batajnica. As the NATO air attacks have started by March 24, squadron has been again engaged in combat operations. It was again relocated to Ponikve port, where from it has made five combat flights in cooperation with 241st Squadron, attacking Kosovo Liberation Army positions at Čičavica mountain. Pilots were flying on extremely low level, due the total air supremacy of NATO aircraft over Kosovo and Serbia. The Ponikve airport, where most of 252nd Squadron aircraft were located was attacked by NATO for 35 times, with three carpet bombings, destroying total airport infrastructure with almost 705 various bombs and missiles. A lot of Orao aircraft were destroyed.

=== 252nd Mixed Aviation Squadron ===
After Kosovo War, the squadron returned to also heavy damaged Batajnica Air Base. In period of one year after the war ended, squadron was not enable to fly. Most of aircraft that have survived NATO attacks were on overhaul, so the squadron has continued its main task, training by spring of 2000. The main problem was same like in the whole air force, lack of fuel and aircraft. Same problem was following the next six years whole Air Force. By 2006, Serbian Armed Forces has started major reorganization, in which squadron was renamed in to 252nd Mixed Aviation Squadron, and it has become part of 204th Air Brigade, which gathered all Air Force units located at Batajnica. Now it is equipped with G-4 Super Galeb, Utva 75 and Utva Lasta 95 aircraft, while J-22 Orao aircraft, which have been overhauled due the expiration of resources, continued their service in 241st Fighter-Bomber Aviation Squadron.

=== 252nd Training Squadron ===
On December 15, 2010, due to new reorganization of the Serbian Air Force, squadron was renamed in to 252nd Training Squadron remaining part of 204th Air Brigade located at Batajnica Air Base.

== Missions ==
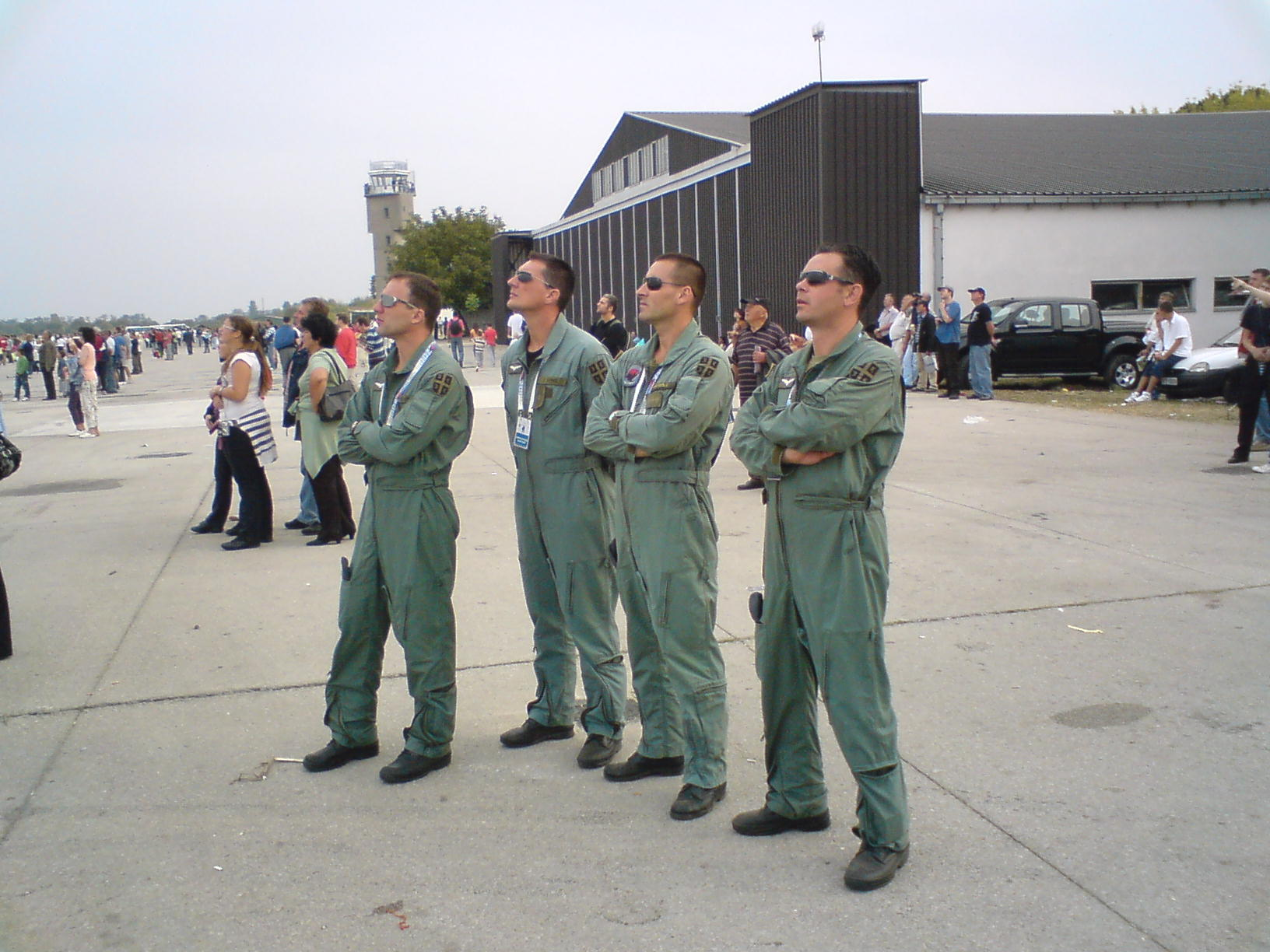
Members of the squadron at 2009 airshow

The main tasks of 252nd Training Squadron are training, aerial firing support to ground troops and pulling the targets for air defense training.

== Assignments ==
- Yugoslav Air Force Command (1967–1986)
- 1st Corps of Air Force and Air Defense (1986–1988)
- 701st Aviation Brigade (1988–1990)
- 97th Aviation Brigade (1990–1992)
- 204th Aviation Brigade (1992–1994)
- 98th Aviation Brigade (1994–1997)
- 98th Fighter Bomber Aviation Regiment (1997–2006)
- 204th Aviation Base (2006–2010)
- 204th Air Brigade (2010–present)

== Designations ==
- 525th Training Squadron (1967–1986)
- 252nd Fighter-Bomber Aviation Squadron (1986–2006)
- 252nd Mixed Aviation Squadron (2006–2010)
- 252nd Training Squadron (2010–present)

== Bases ==
- Batajnica Air Base (1967–present)

== Commanders ==
Service term	Name
1966–1967	Josip Marijanić
1967–1970	Aleksandar Veselinović
1970–1978	Ðorde Stijović
1978–1980	Zdenko Babić
1980–1981	Srećko Dugalić
1981–1986	Dragoslav Spasojević
1986–1988	Predrag Stakić
1988–1992	Života Marković
1992	Radinko Marčeta
1992–1993	Miljko Stefanović
1993–1994	Brane Majkić
1994	Nenad Nićiforović
1994–1995	Srđan Cimbaljević
1995–1996	Zoran Marijanović
1996–1997	Mihailo Jordačević
1997–1998	Dragan Todorović
1998–1999	Josip Želi
1999–2000	Dragan Todorović
2000–2001	Saša Nikitović
2001–2004	Predrag Bandić
2004–2005	Valerij Lovren
2005–2007	Dušan Krneta
2007–2010	Milan Jelić
2010–2012	Bojan Milosavljević
2012–2017	Zoran Erkić
2017–present	Boško Šerbedžija

== Equipment ==
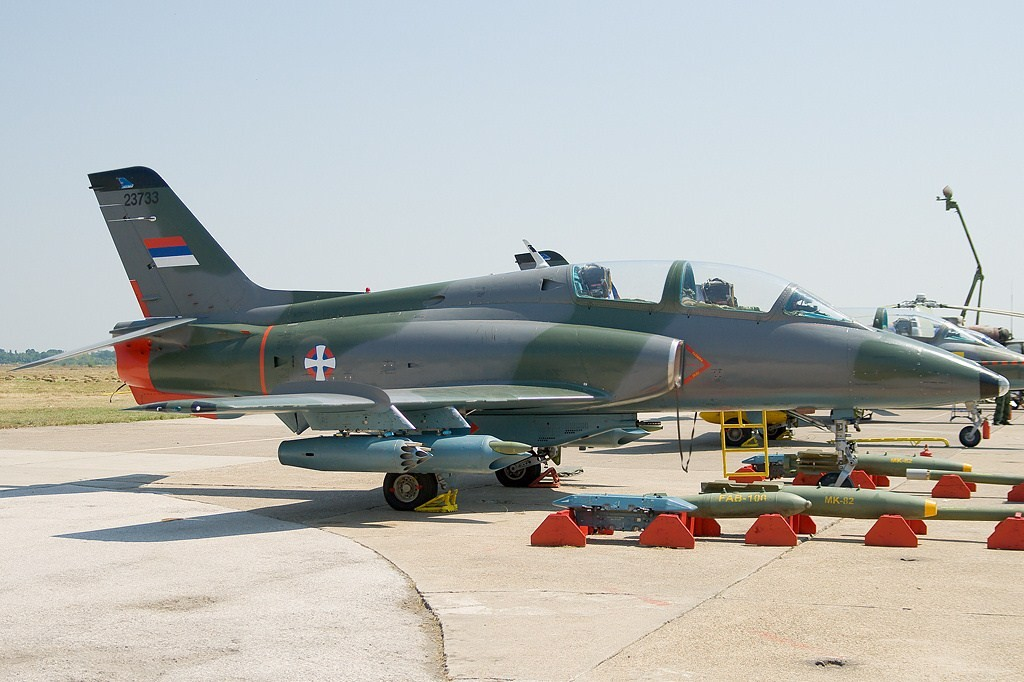
G-4 Super Galeb of the 252nd Training Squadron

=== Current ===
- Soko G-4 Super Galeb (1982–present)
- Utva Lasta 95 (2018–present)

=== Retired ===
- Republic F-84G Thunderjet (1967)
- Kurir (1967)
- T-33 Shooting Star (1971–1983)
- Utva 66 (1981–1992)
- Soko G-2 Galeb (1968–1994)
- Soko J-21 Jastreb (1972–1994)
- Soko J-22 Orao (1997–2006)
- Utva 75 (1997–2018)
