= 1st Air Reconnaissance Regiment =

1st Air Reconnaissance Regiment: 1. puk VOJIN
- Active: 1955–1992
- Disbanded: June, 1992
- Country: Yugoslavia
- Branch: Yugoslav Air Force
- Size: 2 battalions
- Part of: 1st Corps of Air Force and Air Defense
- Command: Belgrade

The 1st Air Reconnaissance Regiment (Serbo-Croatian Latin: 1. puk VOJIN, 1. пук ВОЈИН) was an air reconnaissance regiment established in 1955 as the SFR Yugoslav Air Force 211th Air Reconnaissance Regiment.

== History ==
The 211th Air Reconnaissance Regiment was established on 8 June 1955, from the 101st Air Reconnaissance Battalion and 103rd Air Reconnaissance Battalion with its headquarters at Belgrade. As part of the "Drvar" re-organisation plan in 1959, the regiment was redesignated as the 1st Air Reconnaissance Regiment. In accordance with an order issued on 27 January 1963, its reserve location was changed from Zemun to Batajnica. On 12 June 1992, the regimental headquarters was transformed into the headquarters of the 126th Air Reconnaissance Brigade.

== Assignments ==
- 7th Aviation Corps (1955–1959)
- 1st Air Command (1959–1964)
- 1st Air Defense Zone (1964–1966)
- 11th Air Defense Division (1966–1986)
- 1st Corps of Air Force and Air Defense (1986–1992)

== Previous designations ==
- 211th Air Reconnaissance Regiment (1955–1959)
- 1st Air Reconnaissance Regiment (1959–1992)

== Commanding officers ==
- Colonel Milan Milićević
- Colonel Janko Rajčević
- Colonel Darko Milosević
- Colonel Đuro Rodić
- Colonel Svetlok Kostić
- Colonel Žarko Zrnić
- Colonel Michael Žugić
- Colonel Žarko Zrnić
