= Glasnik RV i PVO =

Cover of issue nr. 3, featuring Utva Lasta, light-trainer, May-June 1986

Glasnik RV i PVO (Air Force and Air Defence Force Courier) was published by the Yugoslav Air Force, i.e. Ratno Vazduhoplovstvo i Protivvazdušna Odbrana - (RV i PVO).

Published from 1970 to 1991, the bi-monthly publication was oriented towards expert analysis of diverse aviation topics. Considering the quality and sourcing of data in aircraft aerodynamics, flight mechanics, guidance and control, materials, construction, propulsion systems, ground aids, aviation medicine, aviation law and regulations, as well as, news from other air forces, it gathered a substantial expert base.

The publishers address was: Glasnik RV i PVO, 11082 Zemun, Maršala Tita 1.

Subscriptions address: Vojnoizdavački zavod, Svetozara Markovića 70, Beograd, (za Glasnik RV i PVO).

On May 8, 1970 (nr. 70), by edict of the President of the Republic, Marshal Josip Broz - Tito, the publication "Glasnik RV i PVO" was awarded the Order of military merits with the great star (I. rank).

On May 21, 1975, by decision on SSNO (Saveznog Sekretarijata Narodne Odbrane, i.e. Defence Department) Glasnik RV i PVO was awarded the Grand Plaque of the Yugoslav People's Army - (JNA).

== See also ==
- Yugoslav People's Army
- Yugoslav Air Force
- SFRJ
- Krila Armije
- Aerosvet
