= 204th Air Brigade =

Serbian military unit

- 204. ваздухопловна бригада
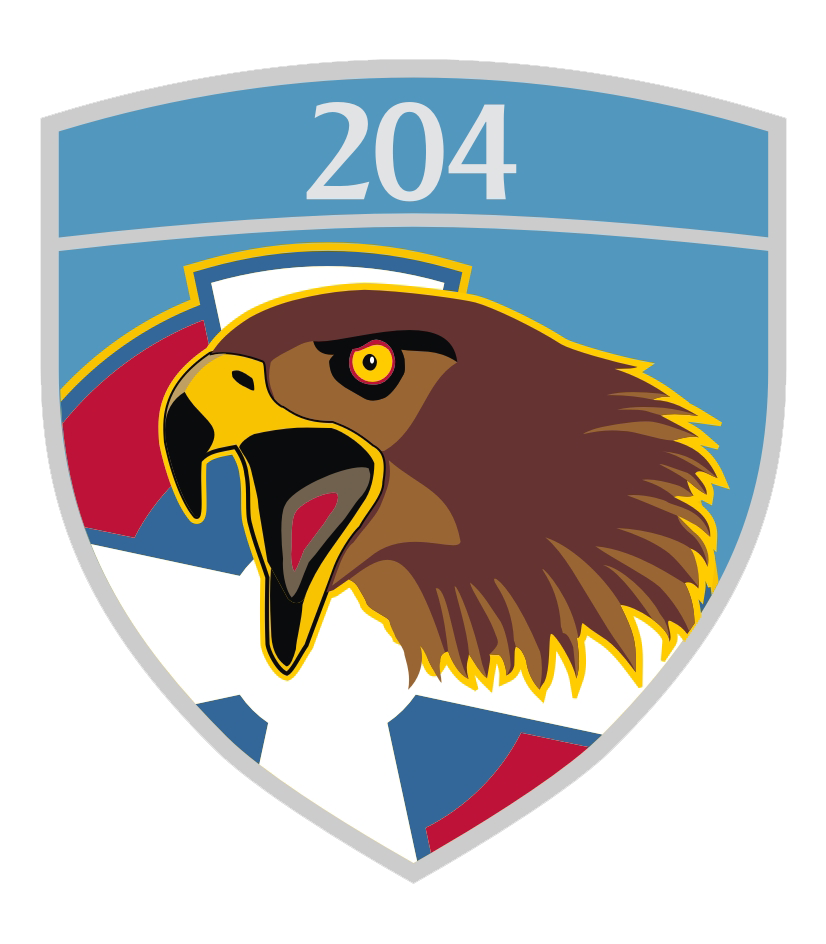
- Active: 2006 – present
- Country: Serbia
- Branch: Serbian Air Force and Air Defence
- Type: Air brigade
- Role: Airspace control Air transport Fire support
- Garrison/HQ: Batajnica Air Base
- Anniversaries: 2 December

Commanders
- Current commander: Brigadier General Milan Elenkov

The 204th Air Brigade (Serbian: 204. ваздухопловна бригада, romanized: 204. vazduhoplovna brigada) is a mixed (fighter, transport and training) brigade of the Serbian Air Force and Air Defence.

== History ==
The brigade was formed on 15 November 2006 as successor of 204th Fighter Aviation Regiment of the Air Force of Serbia and Montenegro from units of the former Air Force of Serbia and Montenegro: 204th Fighter Aviation Regiment, 252nd Fighter-Bomber Aviation Squadron, 890th helicopter squadron, 677th transport aviation squadron and one unit of 353rd reconnaissance squadron.

== Missions ==
In peace time, brigade performs the following tasks:

- airspace control
- air reconnaissance
- air transport
- participation in peacekeeping operations and in international military cooperation
- providing support to civil authorities in case of natural disasters, industrial and other accidents and epidemics

In war time, brigade performs the following tasks:

- combat for airspace control
- fire support
- air defence of the territory
- air reconnaissance
- air transport

== Structure ==
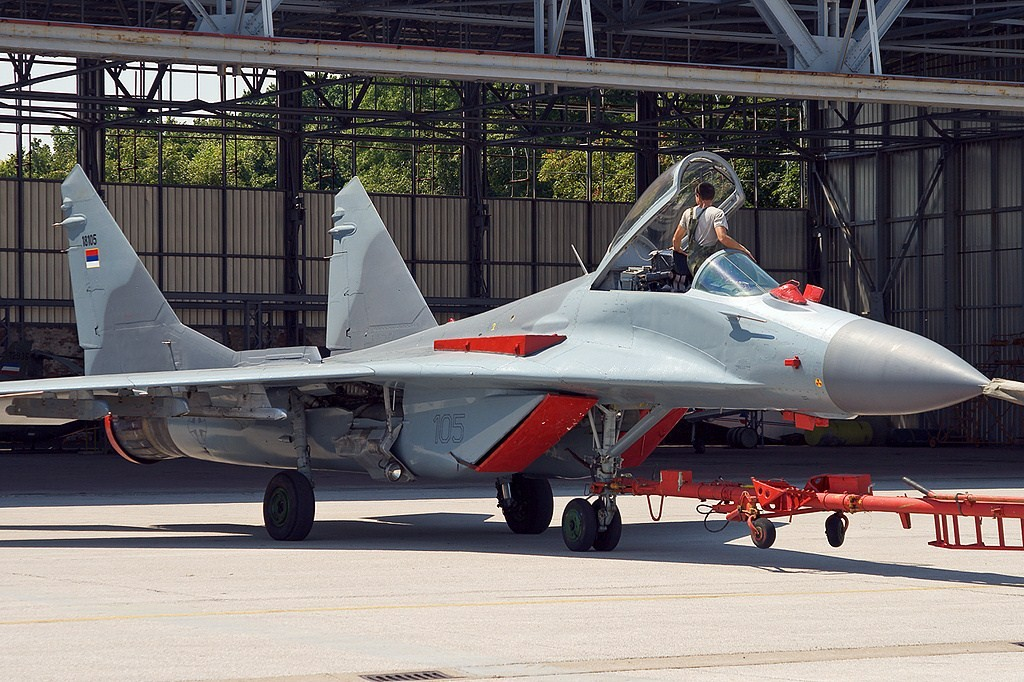
MiG-29 of the 101st Fighter Squadron

The 204th Air Brigade is composed of the following units:

- 101st Fighter Squadron "Knights" (equipped with MiG-29SM)
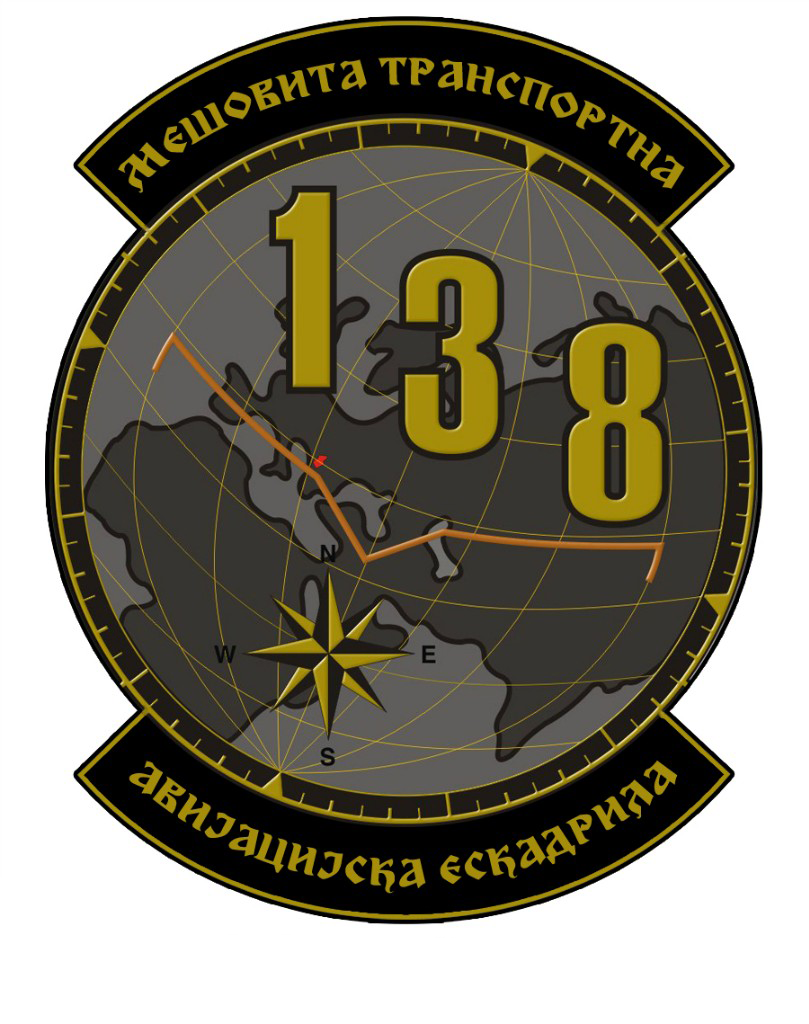
- 138th Transport Squadron "Storks" (equipped with C-295 and Mi-8T)
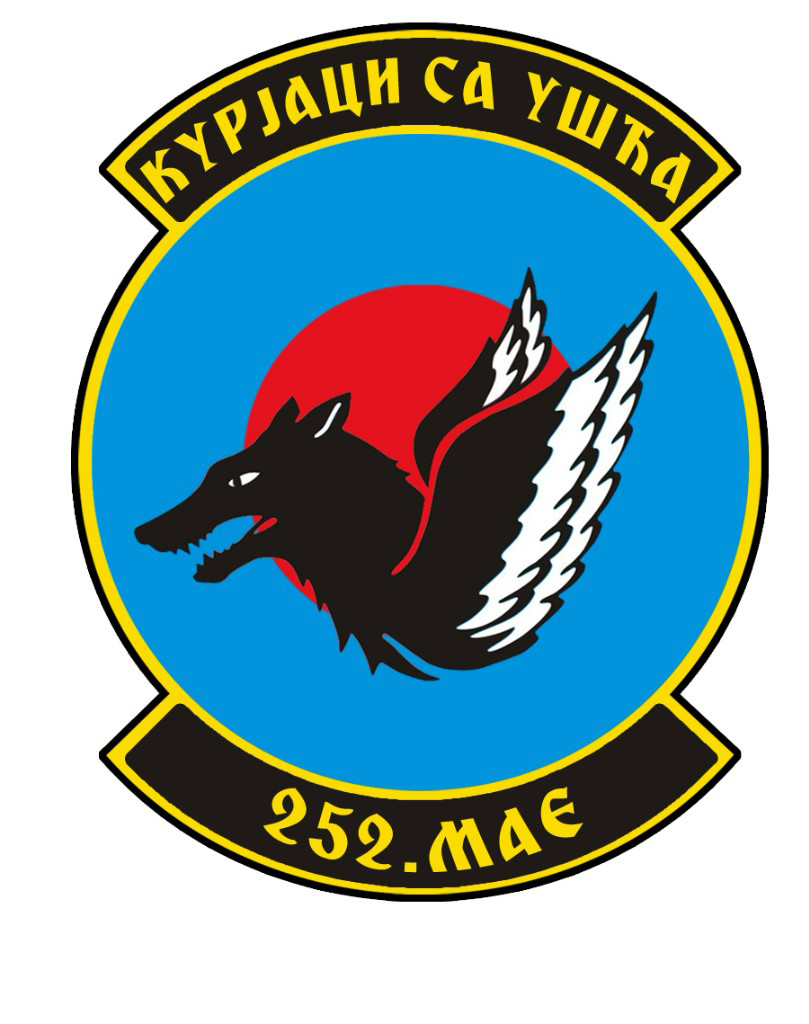
- 252nd Training Squadron "Ušće Wolves" (equipped with G-4M and Lasta 95)
- 890th Mixed Helicopter Squadron "Pegasuses" (equipped with H145M, Mi-17V-5, and SA341H)
- 177th Air Defence Artillery Missile Battalion
- 24th Air Technical Battalion
- 17th Air Base Security Battalion

== Traditions ==
=== Heritage ===
The 204th Air Brigade continues traditions of the famous 6th Fighter Regiment of the Royal Yugoslav Air Force, which distinguished itself in the defense of Belgrade during the 1941 invasion of Yugoslavia in the World War II.

=== Anniversary ===
The anniversary of the unit is celebrated on December 2. On that day in 1949, the 204th Fighter Aviation Regiment was formed, which has the longest tradition of all the units that are part of today's brigade, as a continuation of the tradition of the famous 6th Fighter Regiment, which distinguished itself in the defense of Belgrade in 1941.

=== Patron saint ===
The unit's slava or its patron saint is Saint Elijah known as Ilindan.
