= Batajnica Air Base =

Colonel-pilot Milenko Pavlović Air Base
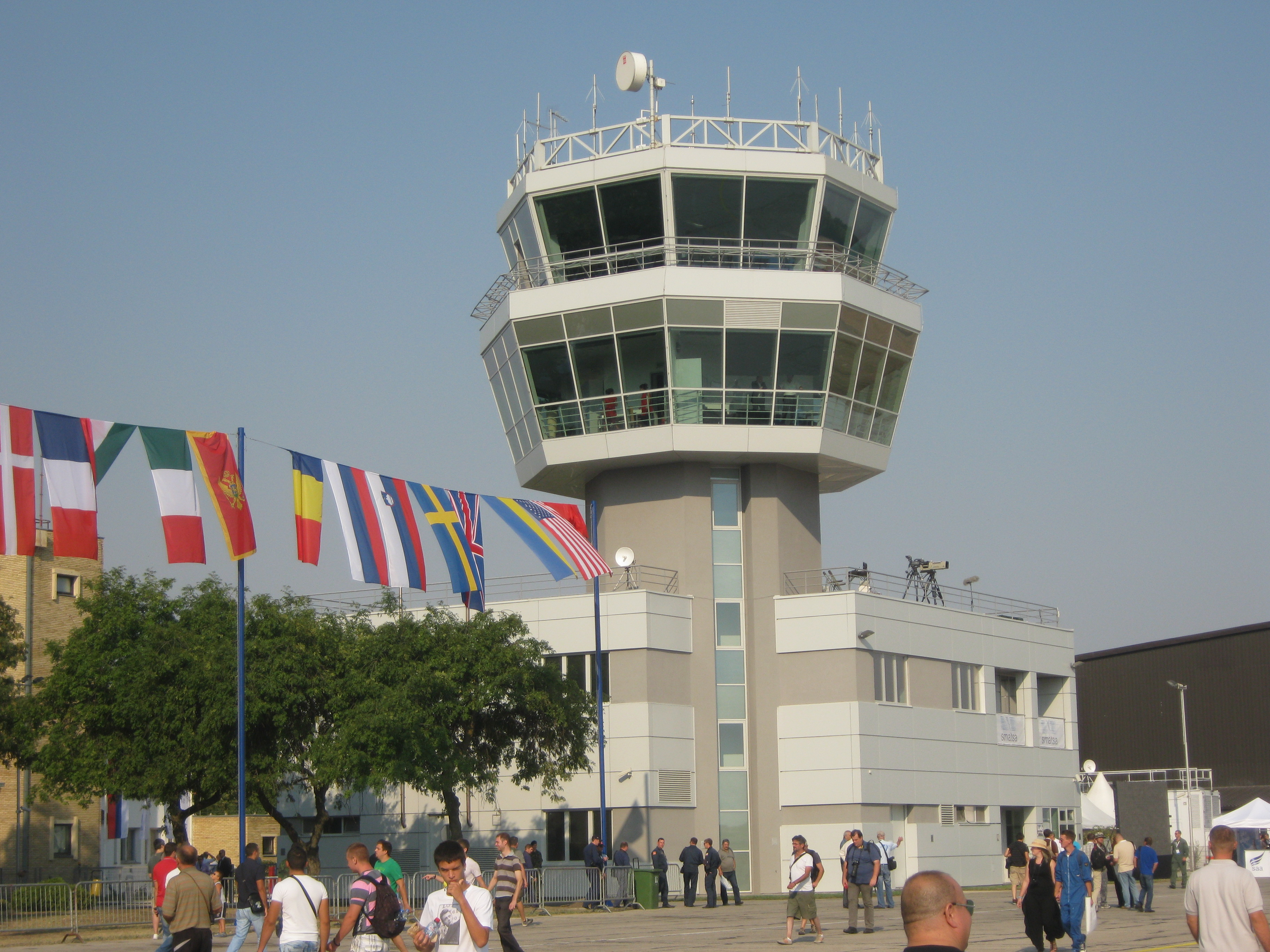
- IATA: BJY; ICAO: LYBT

Summary
- Airport type: Military air base
- Operator: Serbian Air Force and Air Defence
- Serves: Belgrade
- Location: Belgrade, Serbia
- Built: 1947
- In use: 1951–present
- Elevation AMSL: 281 ft (86 m)
- Coordinates: 44°56′07″N 020°15′27″E

Map
- Location within Serbia

Runways
Direction	Length		Surface
Direction	ft	m	Surface
11/29	3,609	1,100	Grass
12R/30L	7,999	2,438	Asphalt
12L/30R	8,209	2,502	Asphalt

The Colonel-pilot Milenko Pavlović Air Base (Serbian: Војни аеродром пуковник-пилот Миленко Павловић, romanized: Vojni aerodrom pukovnik-pilot Milenko Pavlović), commonly known as Batajnica Air Base (Serbian: Војни аеродром Батајница, romanized: Vojni aerodrom Batajnica) (IATA: BJY, ICAO: LYBT) is the main air base of Serbia. It is located between Batajnica and Nova Pazova, about 25 km northwest from the center of Belgrade, Serbia.

== History ==
Construction of the airbase started in 1947 and was completed in 1951, when the airbase was officially opened with one grass and two asphalted runways. The purpose of the airbase was to protect the capital Belgrade from aircraft attacks. In the 1980s it was home to the First Military Region's helicopter squadron, flying Aérospatiale Gazelles. It was known as 177th Air Base until the 2006 reorganization and was home of 204th Fighter-Aviation regiment, 138th Transport-Aviation Regiment and other units of Yugoslav Air Force.

During the 1999 NATO bombing of Yugoslavia the airbase was heavily bombed for 25 days and sustained heavy damage.

In 2019, Batajnica Air Base officially changed its name to Colonel-pilot Milenko Pavlović Air Base, in honor of Milenko Pavlović, a pilot killed during the 1999 NATO bombing of Yugoslavia.

== Units ==
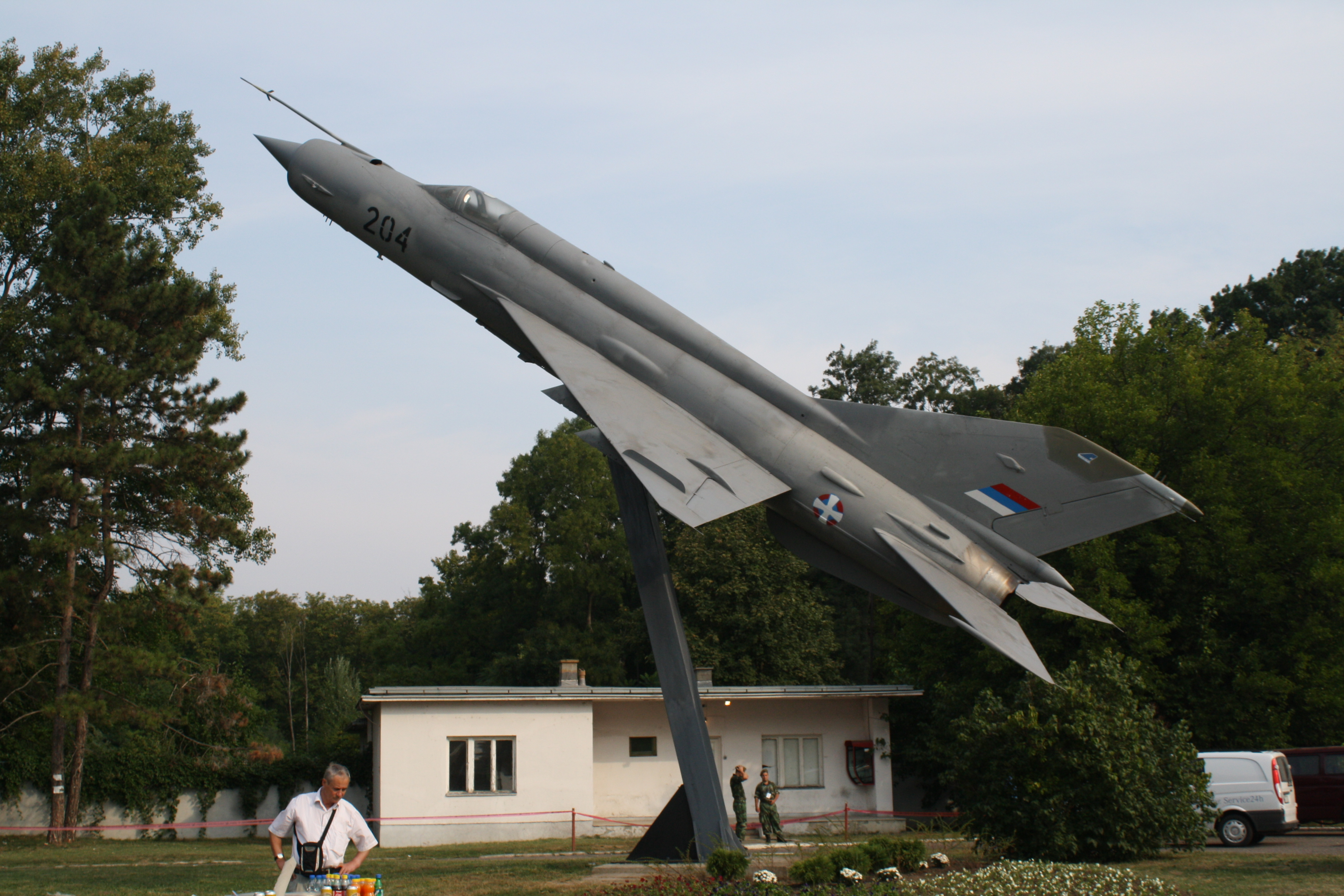
MiG-21 gate guardian

The base is the home station of the following Serbian Air Force and Air Defence units:

- 204th Air Brigade

101st Fighter Squadron "Knights"
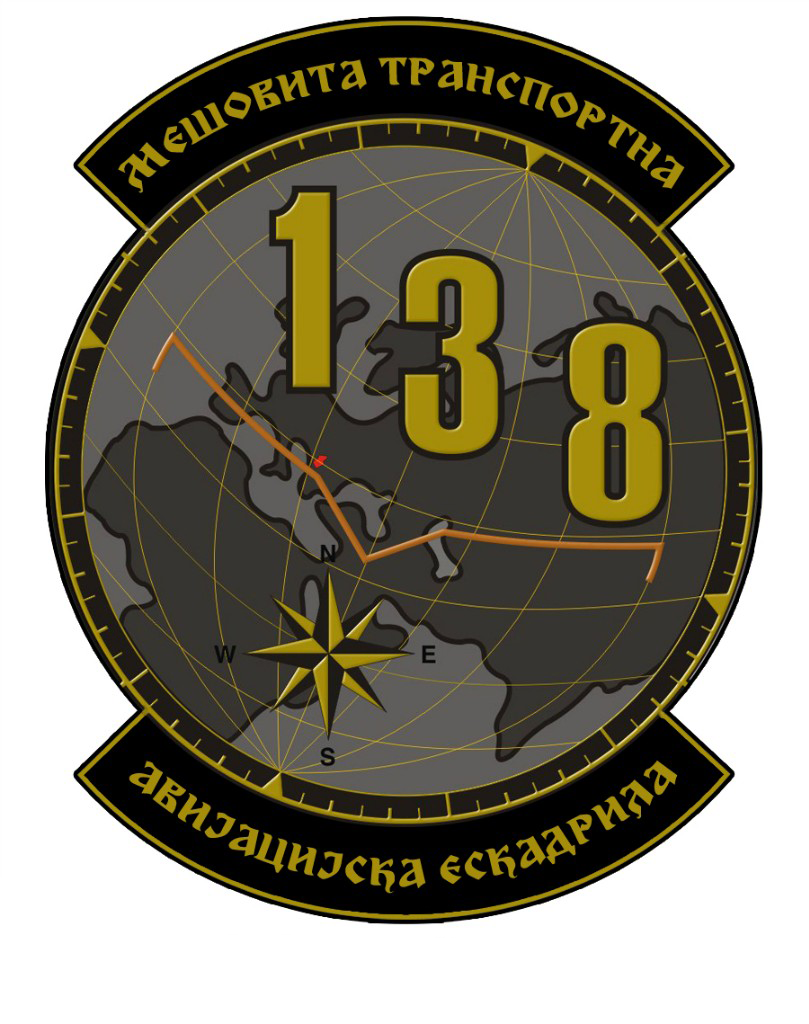
138th Transport Squadron "Storks"
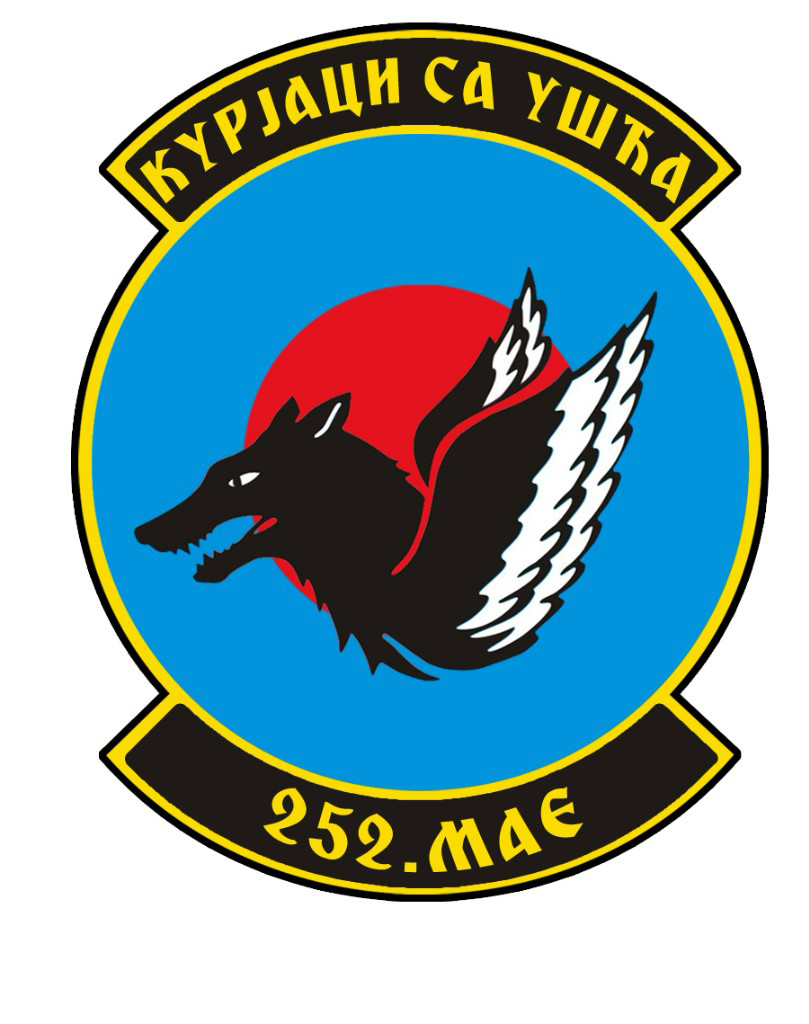
252nd Training Squadron "Ušće Wolves"
890th Mixed Helicopter Squadron "Pegasuses"
177th Air Force Air Defence Artillery Battalion
24th Air Technical Battalion
17th Air Base Security Battalion

- Aeronautical Overhaul Institute "Moma Stanojlović"

The air base also houses Air Force and Air Defence Training Center of the Training Command as well as the Center for Flight Tests of the Technical Testing Center.
