= Tuzla Air Base =

- IATA: TZL; ICAO: LQTZ

Summary
- Airport type: Military
- Elevation AMSL: 784 ft / 239 m
- Coordinates: 44°27′31″N 18°43′29″E
- Website: tuzla-airport.ba

Map
- Location of the airport in Bosnia and Herzegovina

Runways
Direction	Length		Surface
Direction	ft	m	Surface
09/27	8,152	2,485	Asphalt

Tuzla Air Base was a military airport near Tuzla, Bosnia and Herzegovina.

== History ==
Tuzla International was once the largest military airport of the former Yugoslavia. The 350th Reconnaissance Aviation Squadron was active there for a time.

It was placed under the control of the United Nations Protection Force in 1992.

In 1996 it became the main hub for the Implementation Force (IFOR), which was charged with supervising the implementation of the General Framework Agreement for Peace in Bosnia and Herzegovina.

In 1998, the canton of Tuzla turned Tuzla International to a civil airport. Tuzla International Airport opened on 10 October 1998 as a civilian airport and military airfield.

U.S. First Lady Hillary Clinton visited the airport on March 25, 1996, and later claimed that she landed under sniper fire and had to skip the welcoming ceremony, which later proved untrue.
