= Zlín Z 526 =

Sportplane family by Zlin

Zlin Z-526
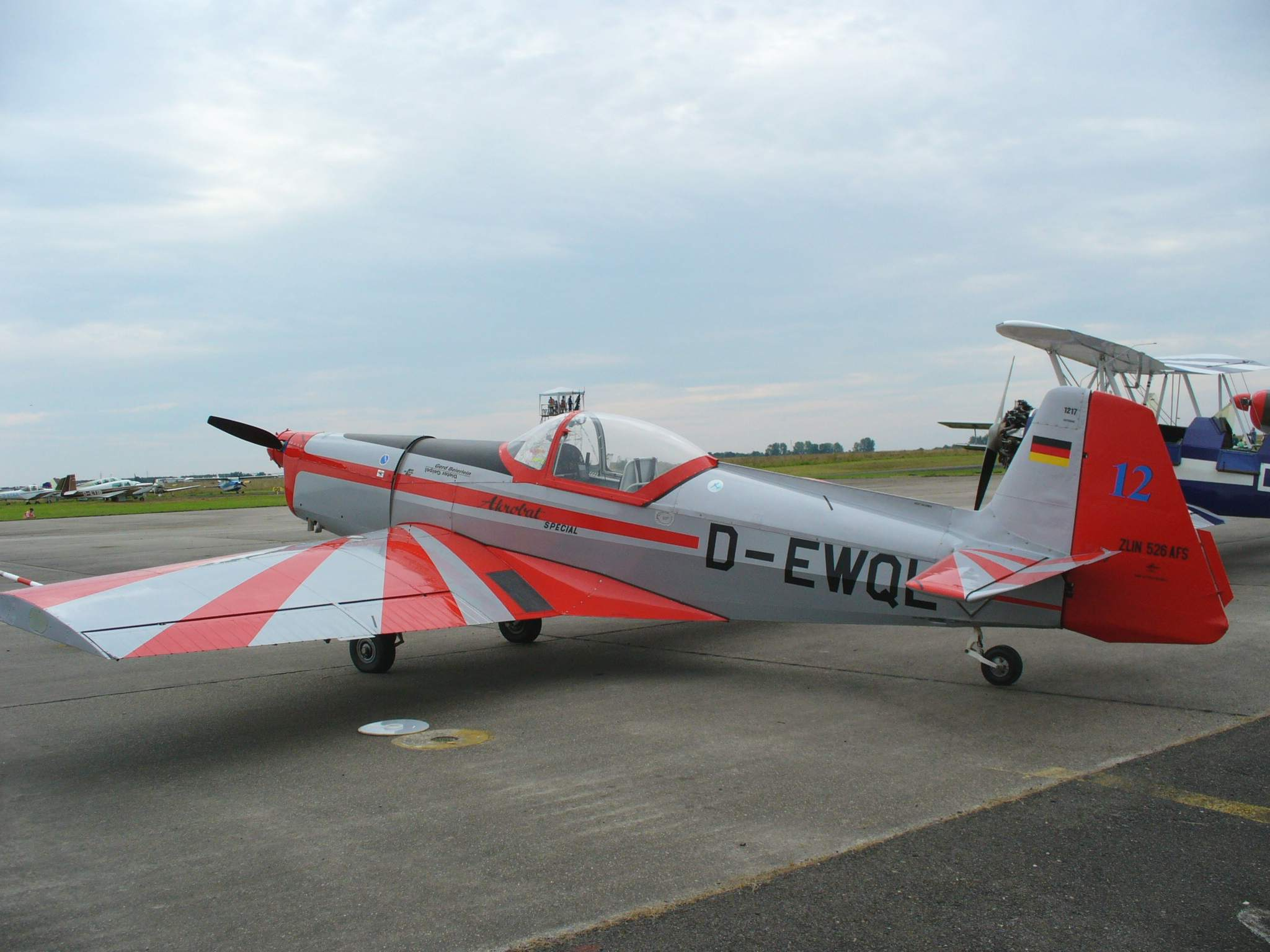

General information
- Type: Sports plane
- Manufacturer: Zlin Aircraft
- Number built: 1,400+

History
- First flight: 1959

The Zlin Z-526 Akrobat is a Czech sports plane used in aerobatics.

== History ==
The Z-526 was originally designed by Zlin Aircraft in 1959. Its two-seat version is called the Trener-Master.

The Z 526's layout was organized with the pilot in the rear, and the student in the front. The aircraft could be equipped also with tip tanks and a constant speed propeller. The Z-526F was introduced in 1968 and was equipped with a 135 kW (180 hp) Avia M 137A engine, the export version Z-526L differing by being equipped with a 150 kW (200 hp) Lycoming AEIO-360 flat-four. Single-seat versions included the Z-526A, Z-526AS, and the Z-526AFS.

The Z-526 AFM was built between 1981 and 1984 and was powered by a 155 kW (210 hp) Avia M337 engine, had tip tanks and a lengthened fuselage. The aircraft was later developed into the Zlin Z-726.

More than 1,400 Z-526s were manufactured, many for military and private flying schools.

== Variants ==
Z-526
Two-seat version
Z-526A
Single-seat version
Z-526AF
Single-seat version
Z-526AFS
Single-seat version
Z-526AFM Condor
powered by an Avia M337 inverted six-cylinder engine giving 210hp(157kW)

== Aircraft on display ==
Serbia

- Z-526M - Museum of Aviation (Belgrade) in Belgrade

== Specifications (Z-526 Trener-Master) ==

Data from Jane's all the World's Aircraft 1968–69

General characteristics

- Crew: 2 (526A / 526F - 1)
- Length: 7.8 m (25 ft 7 in)
- Wingspan: 10.6 m (34 ft 9 in)
- Height: 2.06 m (6 ft 9 in)
- Wing area: 15.45 m^{2} (166.3 sq ft)
- Airfoil: root: NACA 2418; tip: NACA 4412
- Empty weight: 680 kg (1,499 lb)

Z 526A 650 kg (1,430 lb)

- Max takeoff weight: 975 kg (2,150 lb) (trainer)

940 kg (2,070 lb) (aerobatic)
Z 526A 830 kg (1,830 lb) (aerobatic)

- Fuel capacity: 2x 45 L (12 US gal; 9.9 imp gal) tanks in the wing roots, with a 7 L (1.8 US gal; 1.5 imp gal) gravity collector tank in the fuselage.
- Powerplant: 1 × Walter Minor 6-III 6-cylinder air-cooled inverted in-line piston engine, 120 kW (160 hp) (later variants 155 kW (208 hp) Avia M337)
- Propellers: 2-bladed V 503, 1.9 m (6 ft 3 in) diameter constant-speed propeller

Performance

- Maximum speed: 220 km/h (140 mph, 120 kn) at sea level
- Cruise speed: 208 km/h (129 mph, 112 kn) (70% power)
- Landing speed: 78 km/h (48 mph; 42 kn)
- Never exceed speed: 320 km/h (200 mph, 170 kn)
- Range: 580 km (360 mi, 310 nmi)
- Ferry range: 610 km (380 mi, 330 nmi) with wing-tip tanks
- Service ceiling: 5,000 m (16,000 ft)
- Rate of climb: 5 m/s (980 ft/min) at sea level
- Take-off run: 220 m (720 ft)
- Landing run: 135 m (443 ft)
