= Krila Armije =

Publication of the Yugoslav Air Force

Krila Armije (Wings of the Army) was published by the Yugoslav Air Force (Ratno Vazduhoplovstvo i Protivvazdušna Odbrana - (RV i PVO).

First published on 15 July 1948, the bi-weekly publication was printed every other Thursday. The magazine served as a reporting tool for RV i PVO soldiers, cadets, and officers.

By edict of the President of the Republic, Marshal Josip Broz - Tito, Krila Armije was awarded the Order of military merits with golden swords (II. rank).

== See also ==
- Yugoslav People's Army
