= Yugoslav Air Force =

Branch of Yugoslav military for aerial warfare and defense

Air Force and Air Defence
- Ратно ваздухопловство и противваздушна одбрана Ratno vazduhoplovstvo i protivvazdušna odbrana
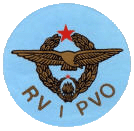
- Founded: 1945
- Disbanded: 1992
- Country: Yugoslavia
- Type: Air force
- Size: 32,000 personnel (c. 1990)
- Part of: Yugoslav People's Army
- HQ: Zemun
- March: Hej vojnici, vazduhoplovci (Hey Soldiers, Airmen!)
- Equipment: 1,200 aircraft
- Engagements: World War II; Yugoslav Wars: Ten-Day War; Croatian War of Independence; 1992 Yugoslav campaign in Bosnia

Commanders
- Last commander: Colonel General Božidar Stefanović

Insignia
- Roundel

- Fin flash

- Flag (obverse and reverse)

Aircraft flown
- Attack: J-21, J-22, G-4, G-2, SA.342 GAMA
- Fighter: MiG-21, MiG-29
- Patrol: Ka-25, Ka-28, Mi-14
- Reconnaissance: IJ-21, IJ-22
- Trainer: Utva 75, G-2, G-4, NJ-22
- Transport: An-2, An-26, YAK-40, Mi-8

The Air Force and Air Defence (Serbo-Croatian: Ратно ваздухопловство и противваздушна одбрана, Ratno vazduhoplovstvo i protivvazdušna odbrana; abbr. РВ и ПВО/RV i PVO), was one of three branches of the Yugoslav People's Army, the Yugoslav military. Commonly referred-to as the Yugoslav Air Force, at its height it was among the largest in Europe. The branch was disbanded in 1992 after the Breakup of Yugoslavia. In the year 1990, the Air Force had more than 32,000 personnel, but as a result of its more technical requirements, the Air Force had less than 4,000 conscripts.

== History ==
=== World War II, Soviet influence ===
Roundels and fin flash (1943–1946)

Wings

Fuselage (type 1)

Fuselage (type 2)

Fin flash

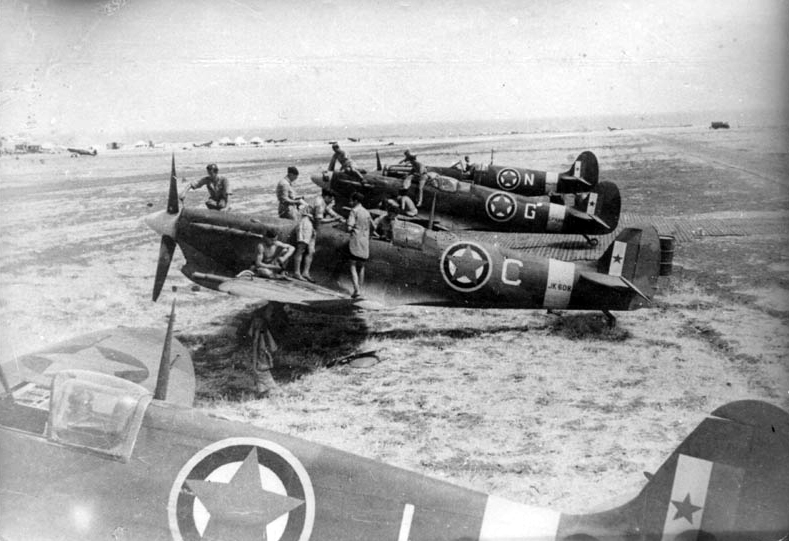
Spitfires of the No 352 (Y) Squadron British Royal Air Force (Balkan Air Force) before first mission on August 18, 1944, from Canne, Italy

By early 1945, Yugoslav Partisans under Marshal Tito had liberated a large portion of Yugoslav territory from the occupying forces. The NOVJ partisan army included air units trained and equipped by Britain (with Supermarine Spitfires and Hawker Hurricanes, see Balkan Air Force) and the Soviet Union (with Yak-3, Yak-7, Yak-9 and Ilyushin Il-2 aircraft) and a number of ad hoc units equipped with aircraft captured from German Luftwaffe and Air Force of the Independent State of Croatia (Messerschmitt Bf 109G, Junkers Ju 87 Stuka and many others).

On 5 January 1945 the various air units of the NOVJ were formally incorporated into a new Yugoslav Air Force (Jugoslovensko Ratno Vazduhoplovstvo - JRV). At the same time, a Yugoslav fighter group which had been under Soviet instruction at Zemun airfield became operational. From 17 August 1944, when the first Yugoslav Spitfire Squadron became operational, until the end of the war in Europe, Yugoslav aircraft undertook 3,500 combat sorties and accumulated 5,500 hours operational flying. Thus, when peacetime came, the JRV already possessed a strong and experienced nucleus of personnel.

On 12 September 1945 the Military Aviation Academy in Belgrade was established to train future pilots. The development of the JRV was further helped in late 1945 with the creation of the Aeronautical Union of Yugoslavia (Vazduhoplovnni Savez Jugoslavije - VSJ). This comprised six aeronautical unions - one for each constituent republic - with the joint aim of promoting sport flying and aeronautical techniques amongst the nation's young people. In June 1947 the first VSJ flying school at Borongaj (near Zagreb) started training pupils.

=== Break-up in relations with Soviets, US help ===
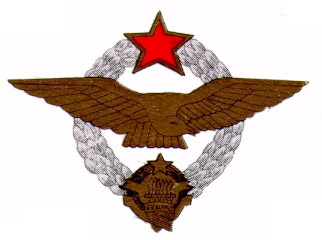
Pilots' wings of the Yugoslav Air Force

The organization of the post-war JRV was based on the Soviet pattern of divisions, regiments and squadrons. Virtually all of the initial equipment was supplied by the Soviet Union – the aircraft captured during the war had quickly been retired. By the end of 1947, the JRV had reached a strength of some 40 squadrons of aircraft and had become the most powerful air arm in the Balkans. In June 1948 Yugoslavia broke off relations with the Stalinist Soviet Union. The country was immediately subjected to extreme political pressure from the Soviet Union and its Balkan neighbours, and the JRV's previous sources of aircraft, spares and fuel were cut off. The possibility of an invasion was taken seriously. The serviceability of JRV aircraft fell rapidly, with some aircraft being cannibalized to provide spares for the remainder. Renewed efforts to expand the small domestic aircraft industry met with some success – the Ikarus Aero 2 and Ikarus 213 Vihor trainers were followed into service by the Ikarus S-49 single-seat fighter and first Yugoslav jet aircraft Ikarus 451M.

However, the first-line strength of the JRV was still declining, so in 1951 the Yugoslav Chief of Staff, Colonel-General Koča Popović, visited the United Kingdom to discuss the situation. It was agreed that a substantial shipment of aircraft would be forthcoming. In October 1951, the first de Havilland Mosquito F.B.6 fighter-bombers were supplied. The following year, 150 Republic P-47D Thunderbolt fighter-bombers were delivered from the USA under a Mutual Assistance Pact.

The first jet aircraft to be operated by the JRV, four Lockheed T-33A jet trainers, arrived on 10 March 1953 and were soon followed by the first of 229 Republic F-84G Thunderjet fighter-bombers. Serials for the Thunderjets were from 10501 to 10729. The first eight Thunderjets, all former 48 TFW aircraft, arrived at Batajnica on June 9, 1953. At the same time, a number of Yugoslav pilots underwent jet flying training in Germany and Colorado, USA. These deliveries substantially improved the combat effectiveness of the JRV. Ten Westland Dragonfly helicopters were obtained in 1954, and in 1956, after numerous delays due to political considerations, 121 F-86E/Canadair CL-13 F.4 Sabres interceptors were delivered.

=== Rebuilding Soviet support ===
In 1959 the JRV was merged with the air defence units operated by the Army and became known as the Air Force and Air Defence (Ratno Vazduhoplovstvo i Protivvazdušna Odbrana - JRViPVO). Relations with the Soviet Union had drastically improved after Nikita Khrushchev became Soviet leader, and in September 1962 this led to the first MiG-21F-13 interceptors being delivered. Lack of possible aircraft for replacement of US-made fighter-bomber jets and trainers induced Yugoslav domestic aircraft industry (Soko, Utva) to make new jet trainers and fighter-bombers. After a number of prototypes, Yugoslav aircraft industry made Soko G-2 Galeb light-attack trainer jet, which partly replaced a number of Lockheed T-33 aircraft, and Galeb's single-seat version, Soko J-21 Jastreb light attack aircraft. The Galeb was a big success, and it was better than Aero L-29 Delfínwhich was the main trainer aircraft in the Warsaw Pact and a number of another air forces. Thus, the Galeb was exported only to Libya. The JRViPVO also purchased a number of domestic UTVA-66 utility aircraft. Twenty-five Mi-4 medium transport helicopters were also obtained for helicopter units from USSR. At the end of 60's JRViPVO purchased a number of Soviet MiG-21's in MiG-21PFM fighter, MiG-21R reconnaissance and MiG-21U and US trainer versions, fifteen Polish Mi-2 light helicopters, twenty five Zlin Z.526M Trainer Masters for Aviation Military Academy at Zemunik airport and the delivery of Mi-8T medium transport helicopters had started.

=== Evolution ===
During the 1970s almost all the American jets were replaced by Soviet MiG-21 fighters and domestic attack/trainer jets. Many new projects, like new Utva 75 trainer, G-4 Super Galeb light attack/trainer jet commenced. The biggest project, Soko J-22 Orao attack aircraft made in cooperation with Romanian IAR, also started. 21 French-built Aérospatiale Gazelle were bought, and after that the Soko factory in Mostar started serial production of the license-built Soko SA.341H which was later built in many other versions. Mi-8T helicopters replaced old Mi-4, Dragonfly, Whirlwind and Mi-2 helicopters. Fighter aviation was also modernized with new MiG-21 versions, MiG-21M, MiG-21MF and MiG-21UM. Transport capability grew with the acquisition of seventeen An-26's.

=== Reorganization ===
The focus in the 1980s was a partial replacement of J-21 and G-2 aircraft with younger Orao and Super Galebs. The air force purchased the latest version of the MiG-21, the MiG-21bis, which was the last MiG-21 model. All 93 Mi-8T transport helicopters were delivered and the Soko factory had produced about 140 license-built Gazelles in various variants. JRV created its display team, Leteće Zvezde (Flying Stars) with seven Soko J-21 Jastreb aircraft which were later replaced with seven Super Galebs. In 1987, the first squadron of new modern MiG-29 fighters was purchased from USSR, making Yugoslavia the first purchaser of it. They were a temporary solution until planned production of new Novi Avion multirole aircraft.

In 1986 the JRViPVO underwent a limited reorganization which saw its operational units grouped into three regional Corps instead of the five Corps used previously. The primary air force missions were to contest enemy efforts to establish air superiority over Yugoslavia and to support the defensive operations of the ground forces and navy. The main organization were the three corps of Air Force and Air Defence; 1st Corps of AF and AD, 2nd Corps of AF and AD and 3rd Corps of AF and AD.

==== Fighter aviation ====
The main component of JRV was the fighter aviation. When the second generation of fighters first appeared, Yugoslavia initially opted to buy French Mirage III fighters, but that option was dismissed due to the French role in Algerian War of Independence. In search for alternative, Yugoslavia turned to USSR and procured Soviet MiG-21's. Therefore, most fighter aircraft were Soviet-made MiG-21 aircraft of different versions MiG-21M, MiG-21MF and MiG-21PFM from the 1970s and MiG-21Bis from the early 1980s. In 1986, JRV had purchased from USSR one squadron of MiG-29 fighter aircraft. In that period MiG-29 was one of the most advanced fighters, and Yugoslavia has become one of the first countries which bought MiG-29. Each Corps of AF and AD had one Fighter Aviation Regiment (Lovački Aviacijski Puk - LAP). The First Corps of AF and AD had the 204th Fighter Aviation Regiment. The role of this regiment was the guarding of the First Corps of AF and AD aerospace from possible aggression, especially protecting the Yugoslav capital, Belgrade, and then support of Yugoslav People's Army ground forces. The 204.LAP composed two fighter squadrons, 126.LAE equipped with MiG-21 Bis aircraft and 127.LAP equipped with new MiG-29's. The base of the 204th Fighter Aviation Regiment was Batajnica Airbase near Belgrade. The Third Corps of AF and AD had the 83rd Fighter Aviation Regiment (83.LAP) based at Slatina Air Base near Priština. 83rd units were equipped with MiG-21 aircraft, 123rd with older MiG-21M and MF and the 130th with MiG-21Bis. The Fifth Corps of AF and AD had the 117th Fighter Aviation Regiment at Željava Air Base. Željava was one of the best airbases in Europe, with underground hangars, facilities for technical support, most advanced radars and communication equipment, sources of electricity, drinking water, fresh air, food, equipment, arms and fuel for staying 30 days without any connections with outside world. Units at Željava were 124th and 125th equipped with MiG-21 Bis fighter aircraft and 352nd equipped with MiG-21R reconnaissance-fighter aircraft.

==== Ground attack aviation ====
Ground Attack Aviation or Fighter-Bomber Aviation (Lovačko-Bombarderska Aviacija) was in the second plan of JRV. All attack aircraft were home-made. The new aircraft like J-22 Orao attack aircraft and G-4 Super Galeb light-attack trainer were replacing older J-21 Jastreb light-attack and G-2 Galeb light-attack trainer aircraft. The First Corps of AF and AD had two fighter-bomber squadrons and one reconnaissance squadron equipped with ground attack reconnaissance aircraft. 252nd from Batajnica Airbase was under direct command of its Corps of AF and AD (unlike other squadrons which were under the command of their Regiments/Brigades). It was equipped with older J-21 Jastreb light attack aircraft and G-2 Galeb trainer/attack aircraft, Utva-66 utility aircraft and new G-4 Super Galebs. Under command of the 97th Aviation Brigade (which was in 1st Corps of AF and AD) there was one fighter-bomber squadron, 240th, equipped with Jastrebs and one reconnaissance squadron, 353.IAE, equipped with IJ-22 Orao reconnaissance-attack aircraft. The Third Corps of AF and AD had two major fighter-bomber aviation units, 98th Aviation Brigade and 127th Fighter-Bomber Aviation Regiment. 98th Aviation Brigade from Skopski Petrovac in Macedonia had three squadrons, two fighter-bomber squadron and one reconnaissance squadron. Fighter-bomber squadrons were 241st equipped with J-22 Orao attack aircraft, 247th with Jastrebs and 354th IAE was equipped with IJ-21 Jastreb reconnaissance aircraft. 127th Fighter-Bomber Aviation Regiment at Golubovci Airbase comprised two fighter-bomber squadrons, 239th equipped with G-4 Super Galebs and 242nd equipped with Jastrebs and J-22 Orao aircraft. The Fifth Corps of AF and AD had most fighter-bomber aviation units, one Aviation Brigade and two Fighter-Bomber Aviation Regiments. 82nd Aviation Brigade, at Cerklje Airbase, Slovenia, had two fighter-bomber squadrons and one reconnaissance squadron. Two fighter-bomber squadrons were 237.LBAE equipped with J-21 and NJ-21 Jastrebs, and 238th equipped with J-22 and NJ-22 Orao aircraft. Reconnaissance squadron was 351st equipped with IJ-21 Jastreb and IJ-22 Orao reconnaissance-attack aircraft. 105th Fighter-Bomber Aviation Regiment at Zemunik-Zadar Airbase comprised two fighter-bomber aviation squadrons, 249th equipped with Super Galebs, 251st with Galebs and one aviation squadron, 333rd equipped with Utva 75 training aircraft, An-2 transport aircraft, Gazelle helicopters and Super Galebs. 185th Fighter-Bomber Aviation Regiment at Pula Airport has compos of one fighter-bomber squadron, 229th equipped with G-4 Super Galebs and one fighter squadron, 129th equipped with MiG-21 aircraft in versions MiG-21PFM, MiG-21US and MiG-21UM.

==== Training units ====
The Marshal Tito Air Force Military Academy used the 105th Fighter-Bomber Aviation Regiment from Zadar, 107th Helicopter Regiment from Mostar, 127th Fighter-Bomber Aviation Regiment from Golubovci Airbase and 185th Fighter-Bomber Aviation Regiment from Pula for training of its cadets. Cadets first learned how to fly on utility aircraft like the Utva 75. The main base was in Zadar, in 105th Fighter-Bomber Aviation Regiment, where young pilots made their first flights on Utva 75 aircraft. After they learned basics about flying in 333rd, they learned how to fly on jet aircraft in 251st on G-2 Galeb jet-trainers. When cadets mastered flying on Galeb jet trainers, they developed their flying on jet aircraft in 249th on Super Galeb trainers. After learning how to fly on jet aircraft, cadets continued their pilot education in other units dependent upon whether they became helicopter, fighter or fighter-bomber pilots. Cadets to become helicopter pilots, continued their education in the 107th Helicopter Regiment at Mostar, flying on Gazelle helicopters in 782nd and 783rd or on Mi-8 helicopters in 782nd. Fighter-bomber pilot cadets continued their education in 127th Fighter-Bomber Aviation Regiment at Golubovci flying first on Super Galebs in 239th and later on J-21 Jastreb and J-22 Orao attack aircraft in 242nd Fighter pilot cadets continued their education in 185th Fighter-Bomber Aviation Regiment at Pula where they first fly on Super Galebs in 229th and later in 129th on MiG-21PFM and MiG-21UM/US they made they first super sonic flights. After finishing studies, cadets of Air Force Military Academy "Maršal Tito" become pilots and joined their service units.

==== Transport units ====
The major transport aviation unit was the 138th Transport Aviation Brigade at Batajnica Airbase. The 138th was a separate unit under direct command of JRViPVO HQ. It consisted of three squadrons, two VIP transport aviation squadrons and one transport helicopter squadron. Transport aviation squadrons were 675th equipped with Yak-40, Falcon 50 and 678th equipped with YAK-40 VIP aircraft and Mi-8 helicopters in VIP transport version. There were also few transport aviation units from non-Transport Brigades/Regiments. In the 119th Aviation Brigade at Niš there were 677 equipped with An-26 and An-2 aircraft which were used for training of the 63rd Paratroop Brigade. At Pleso, in 111th Aviation Brigade was 676th was also equipped with An-26 and An-2 transport aircraft. There was also one aviation squadron, 333.AE from 105th Fighter-Bomber Aviation Regiment at Zadar which was equipped with one An-2 aircraft used for parachute training of cadets of the Marshal Tito Air Force Military Academy.

==== Helicopter units ====
Helicopter units of JRV were equipped with about 190 home-made Gazelle helicopters in utility, attack, rescue and scout versions, 90 Soviet-made Mil Mi-8T Hip-C cargo helicopters and 12 Soviet anti-submarine helicopters. Each Corps of AF and AD had a Special Helicopter Squad (Specijalno Helikoptersko Odeljenje - SHO) equipped with four Mi-8 helicopters unless the Special Helicopter Squad of the First Corps of AF and AD, which was equipped with two Aérospatiale Alouette III light utility helicopters and two Mi-8 transport helicopters. In the 138th Transport Aviation Brigade which was separate unit under direct command of JRViPVO HQ there was one transport helicopter squadron, 890.TRHE equipped with Mi-8 and Gazelle helicopters. The First Corps of AF and AD had the 107th Helicopter Regiment from Mostar (BiH), which consisted of two squadrons, 782.HE equipped with Gazelle helicopters in SA.341 and SA.342 Gama versions and Mi-8, and 783.HE equipped with Gazelle helicopters. Squadrons of the 107th Helicopter Regiment were used by the Marshal Tito Air Force Military Academy. Also there were three helicopter squadrons of the 97th Aviation Brigade at Divulje; 676.PPAE equipped with Gazelle helicopters and CL-215 firefighting aircraft, 784.PPHE equipped with 12 Mi-14, Ka-25 and Ka-28 anti-sub helicopters and 790.TRHE equipped with Mi-8 cargo helicopters. In the Third Corps of AF and AD there were three helicopter squadrons in 119. Aviation Brigade; 712.POHE equipped with Gazelle Gama attack helicopters, 714.POHE also equipped with Gazelle Gama helicopters and 787.TRHE equipped with Mi-8 transport helicopters. In Fifth Corps of AF and AD there were also three helicopter squadrons; 711.POHE equipped with Gazelle Gama, 713.POHE also equipped with Gazelle Gama attack helicopters and 780.TRHE equipped with Mi-8 cargo helicopters. There was also one mixed-aviation squadron, 333.AE from 105.LBAP which had few Gazelle helicopters used for training by the Marshal Tito Air Force Military Academy.

The Army command regions also had their helicopter squadrons equipped with Gazelle Hera scout helicopters. The EIV of the First Military Region was at Batajnica Airbase, EIV of 2nd Army region was at Skopski Petrovac, EIV of 3rd Army region at Pleso and EIV of Navy region was at Divulje.

=== Yugoslav wars, downfall ===
In 1991 the deep rooted grievances that had been threatening the unity of the Federal state for some time finally came to a head when Slovenia initiated moves towards independence. At the end of June 1991 the JRViPVO was tasked with transporting soldiers and federal police to Slovenia. The Slovenes resisted this re-imposition of central control, which rapidly escalated into an armed conflict. Two air force helicopters were shot down, while the JRViPVO launched air strikes on TV transmitters and Slovenian territorial defence positions. After a political agreement, the federal forces left Slovenia.

Meanwhile, armed conflict had broken out between Croatian and Serbian forces in Croatia. The JRV flew several low passes in a show of force against Croatia and launched a number of strikes. In August 1991 Serbian dominated federal government began an open war campaign against the Croats. The JRV was active providing transport and close air support missions to ground forces, but was gradually forced to abandon air bases outside of ethnic Serbian held areas. The hostilities were ended by a truce on 3 January 1992. The JRV equipment in Bosnia and Herzegovina was given to the new Republika Srpska Air Force and used during the War in Bosnia. Between 1991 and 1992, the JRV lost a total of 46 airplanes and helicopters in Slovenia, Croatia and Bosnia-Herzegovina. The bulk of the ex-SFRY's air force was inherited by the air force of the new Federal Republic of Yugoslavia.

== 1991 Order of Battle ==
Regiment/brigade	Squadron	Aircraft type	Base
138th Transport Aviation Brigade	675th TRAE 678th TRAE 890th TRHE	Yak-40, Falcon 50, Learjet 25, Do-28D Yak-40, Mi-8 Mi-8, SA.341, SA.342	Batajnica
1st Corps of AF and AD
	SHO	SA.316, Mi-8	Batajnica
97th Aviation Brigade	240th LBAE 353rd IAE 676th PPAE 748th PPHE 790th TRHE	J-21 Jastreb IJ-22 Orao CL-215, SA.341 Ka-25, Ka-28, Mi-14 Mi-8	Divulje-Split
107th Helicopter Regiment	782nd HE 783rd HE	SA.341, Sa.342, Mi-8 SA.341, SA.342	Mostar
204th Fighter Aviation Regiment	126th LAE 127th LAE	MiG-21 Bis MiG-29, MiG-29UB	Batajnica
	252nd LBAE	J-21 Jastreb, G-2 Galeb, G-4 Super Galeb, Utva 66	Batajnica
3rd Corps of AF and AD
	SHO	Mi-8	Niš
83rd Fighter Aviation Regiment	123rd LAE 130th LAE	MiG-21 Bis MiG-21M, MiG-21MF	Slatina
98th Aviation Brigade	241st LBAE 247th LBAE 354th IAE	J-22 Orao J-21 Jastreb IJ-21 Jastreb	Skopski Petrovac and Ladjevci/Kraljevo
119th Aviation Brigade	677th TRAE 712th POHE 714th POHE 787th TRHE	An-2, An-26 SA.342 SA.342 Mi-8	Niš
172nd Fighter-Bomber Aviation Regiment	239th LBAE 242nd LBAE	G-4 Super Galeb J-21 Jastreb, J-22 Orao	Golubovci
5th Corps of AF and AD
	SHO	Mi-8	Pleso
82nd Aviation Brigade	237th LBAE 238th LBAE 351st IAE	J-21 Jastreb, NJ-21 Jastreb J-22 Orao, NJ-22 Orao IJ-21 Jastreb, IJ-22 Orao	Cerklje
105th Fighter-Bomber Aviation Regiment	249th LBAE 251st LBAE 333rd AE	G-4 Super Galeb G-2 Galeb Utva 75, An-2, SA.341, G-4 Super Galeb	Zadar
111th Aviation Brigade	676th TRAE 711th POHE 713th POHE 780th TRHE	An-2, An-26 SA.342 SA.342 Mi-8	Pleso
117th Fighter Aviation Regiment	124th LAE 125th LAE 352nd IAE	MiG-21 Bis MiG-21 Bis MiG-21R	Željava
185th Fighter-Bomber Aviation Regiment	129th LAE 229th LBAE	MiG-21PFM, MiG-21UM/US G-4 Super Galeb	Pula
Squadrons of Army command regions
	EIV of 1st Army region EIV of 2nd Army region EIV of 3rd Army region EIV of Navy region	SA.341 Hera SA.341 Hera SA.341 Hera SA.341 Hera	Batajnica Skopski Petrovac Pleso Divulje-Split
Squadrons of Republics territorial defence (TO) staffs
	ELABA RSTO Slovenije ELABA RSTO Crne Gore	J-20 Kragulj/SA.341 J-20 Kragulj	Brnik Golubovci
Yugoslav Military Air Force Academy
105th Fighter-Bomber Aviation Training Regiment 107th Helicopter Training Regiment 172nd Fighter-Bomber Aviation Training Regiment 185th Fighter-Bomber Aviation Training Regiment	(see above)	(see above)	Zadar Mostar Golubovci; Pula

- AE - Aviacijska Eskadrila - Aviation Squadron
- LAE - Lovačka Aviacijska Eskadrila - Fighter Aviation Squadron
- LBAE - Lovačko-Bombarderska Aviacijska Eskadrila - Fighter-Bomber Aviation Squadron
- IAE - Izviđačka Aviacijska Eskadrila - Reconnaissance Aviation Squadron
- TRAE - Transportna Aviacijska Eskadrila - Transport Aviation Squadron
- PPAE - Protivpožarna Aviacijska Eskadrila - Firefighting Aviation Squadron
- HE - Helikopterska Eskadrila - Helicopter Squadron
- SHO - Specijalno Helikoptersko Odeljenje - Special Helicopter Section
- TRHE - Transportna Helikopterska Eskadrila - Transport Helicopter Squadron
- POHE - Protivoklopna Helikopterska Eskadrila - Anti-armour Helicopter Squadron
- PPHE - Protivpodmornička Helikopterska Eskadrila - Anti-submarine Helicopter Squadron

== Aircraft type designation system ==
In 1962 the Yugoslav Air Force introduced a new aircraft designation system to identify specific aircraft types. Prior to this time, the Air Force had been mainly equipped combat aircraft of US origin, such as the F-84G and T-33A, and the US designation was commonly used. However, aircraft locally modified to fulfill the reconnaissance role, such as the F-86D and T-33A, were referred to as the IF-86D and IT-33A. The selection of the MiG-21, which lacked similar designation, as the new front-line fighter led to the introduction of a formal aircraft designation system.

The main designation consisted of a prefix letter signifying the principal role of the aircraft, and a two-digit individual type number, e.g.: J-22. The role prefixes are:

- L - Lovac (fighter)
- J - Jurišnik (attack)
- H - Helikopter (helicopter)
- V - Višenamjenski (utility)
- N - Nastavni (training)
- T - Transportni (transport)

In addition, various role modification prefix and suffix letters are used, to indicate trainer, reconnaissance etc. variants of the basic design. The role modification letters are:

- I - Izviđač (reconnaissance)
- M - Modifikovan (modified)
- N - Nastavni (fighter trainer)
- N - Naoružani (armed helicopter)
- O - Opšte namjene (general purpose)
- P - Protivpodmornički (anti-submarine)
- S - Spasilački (rescue)
- T - Transportni (transport)

Generic	Variant	Type
Fighters
L-10*		Republic F-84G
L-11*		Canadair Sabre
L-12		Mikoyan-Gurevich MiG-21F-13
	NL-12	Mikoyan-Gurevich MiG-21U-400/600
L-13*		North American F-86D Sabre
L-14		Mikoyan-Gurevich MiG-21PFM
	L-14I	Mikoyan-Gurevich MiG-21R
	NL-14	Mikoyan-Gurevich MiG-21US
L-15		Mikoyan-Gurevich MiG-21M
	L-15M	Mikoyan-Gurevich MiG-21MF
L-16	NL-16	Mikoyan-Gurevich MiG-21UM
L-17		Mikoyan-Gurevich MiG-21bis
	L-17K	Mikoyan-Gurevich MiG-21bis-K
L-18		Mikoyan-Gurevich MiG-29
	NL-18	Mikoyan-Gurevich MiG-29UB
Attack
J-20		Soko J-20 Kraguj
J-21		J-1 Jastreb
	IJ-21	Soko RJ-1 Jastreb
	NJ-21	Soko TJ-1 Jastreb
J-22		J-22 Orao
	IJ-22	Soko RJ-2 Orao
	NJ-22	Soko TJ-2 Orao
	INJ-22	Soko RTJ-2 Orao
Helicopter
	WS 51	Westland Dragonfly
	H-19	Sikorsky H-19
H-40		Mil Mi-8
	HT-40	Mil Mi-8T
	HT-40E	Mil Mi-8 E i PED
H-41		Mil/PZL Swidnik Mi-2
	HT-41	Mil/PZL Swidnik Mi-2
H-42		Aerospatiale/Soko SA.341H Gazelle
	HI-42	Soko SA.341H HERA
	HN-42M	Soko SA.341H GAMA
	HO-42	Aerospatiale/Soko SA.341H Gazelle
	HS-42	Soko SA341H
H-43		Kamov Ka-25
	HP-43	Kamov Ka-25Bsh
H-44		Mil Mi-14
	HP-44	Mil Mi-14PL
H-45		Soko SA.342L1 Gazelle
	HN-45M	Soko SA.342L1 GAMA 2
	HO-45	Soko SA.342L1
H-46		Kamov Ka-28
	HP-46	Kamov Ka-28
Utility
V-50		Utva-60H
V-51		Utva-66
V-52		Utva-66H
V-53		Utva-75
Training
N-60		Soko G-2 Galeb
N-61		Zlin Z-526
N-62		Soko G-4 Super Galeb
N-63		Utva Lasta
Transport
T-70		Antonov An-26
T-71		Antonov An-2

== Aircraft inventory 1965–1985 ==
Aircraft	Origin	Role	Version	Quantity
Fighter aircraft
MiG-21	Soviet Union	fighter trainer reconnaissance	MiG-21bis/PFM/M/MF/F-13 MiG-21UM/US MiG-21R	~199 (breakdown: F-13 x 41, PFM x 36, M x 25, MF x 6, bis x 46, bis.K x 45) 28 (breakdown: 25 UM aircraft, 7 US aircraft) 12
MiG-29	Soviet Union	fighter trainer	MiG-29B MiG-29UB	14 2
Ground attack aircraft
Soko J-20 Kraguj	Yugoslavia	counter-insurgency	J-20	40
Soko J-21 Jastreb	Yugoslavia	attack trainer reconnaissance	J-21 NJ-21 IJ-21	108 25 36
Soko J-22 Orao	Yugoslavia	attack trainer reconnaissance	J-22 NJ-22 IJ-22 INJ-22	57 21 25 15
Transport and liaison aircraft
Antonov An-2	Soviet Union	cargo aircraft	An-2TD	5
Antonov An-12	Soviet Union	cargo aircraft	An-12	2
Antonov An-26	Soviet Union	cargo aircraft	An-26	14(17 aircraft provided for first deployment)
Yakovlev Yak-40	Soviet Union	VIP aircraft	Yak-40	6
Dornier Do 28	West Germany	cargo aircraft	Do 28D-2	2
Firefighting aircraft
Canadair CL-215	Canada	firefighting	CL-215	6
Trainer aircraft
Utva 75	Yugoslavia	basic trainer	V-53	138
Soko G-2 Galeb	Yugoslavia	fighter-bomber/trainer	N-60	131
Soko G-4 Super Galeb	Yugoslavia	fighter-bomber/trainer	N-62	85
Helicopters
Soko Gazelle	United Kingdom; France; Yugoslavia	utility rescue reconnaissance attack	HO-42 HS-42 HI-42 HN-42	94
Mil Mi-8	Soviet Union	transport	Mi-8T	93
ASW helicopters
Mil Mi-14	Soviet Union	antisubmarine	Mi-14PL	4
Kamov Ka-27	Soviet Union	antisubmarine	Ka-28	2
Kamov Ka-25	Soviet Union	antisubmarine	Ka-25BSh	6

grand total

- 213 fighters,
- 205 attack aircraft
- 88 reconnaissance aircraft
- 26 transport aircraft
- 6 VIP Transport aircraft
- 430 trainer aircraft
- 6 special mission aircraft
- 187 transport, attack, reconnaissance, and rescue helicopters, and
- 12 anti-submarine helicopters.

== Retired aircraft ==
- F-84G - 219
- F-86D - 98
- IF-86D - 32(A reconnaissance version of the F-86D equipped with a camera.)
- F-86E(M)Sabre - 121(Of these, 46 are Canadian-made CL-13 Saber Mk.IV.)
- T-33A - 4(Jet engine-powered single-engine training aircraft)
- Zlin Z 526M - 25(Single-engine training aircraft powered by reciprocating engine)
- MiG-21U - 18
- MiG-21U-400 - 9
- MiG-21U-600 - 9
- WS-51・Mk.1B - 10
- H-19 - 10
- Mi-2 - 15
- Mi-4 - 25
- Falcon50 - 6
- Learjet25B - 6

219 fighter-bombers, 219 fighters, 32 reconnaissance planes, 65 trainer planes, 60 helicopters, 12 VIP transport planes

Total number of aircraft acquired before the breakup of Yugoslavia
432 fighters, 219 fighter bombers, 205 attack aircraft, 120 reconnaissance aircraft, 26 transport aircraft, 18 VIP transport aircraft, 495 trainer aircraft, 6 special mission aircraft, 247 military helicopters, anti-submarine aircraft. There will be 12 helicopters.

== Gallery ==
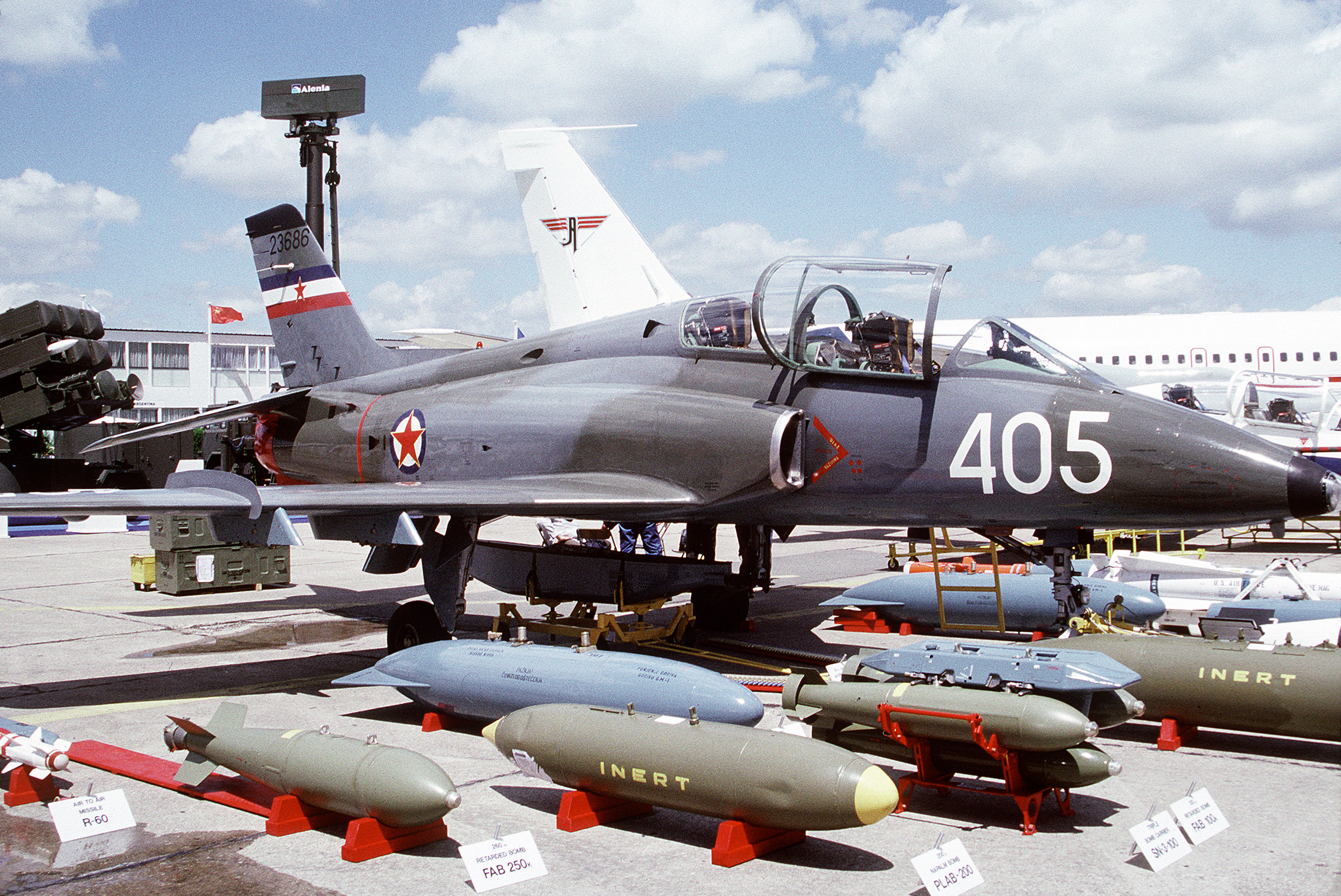
Yugoslav air force G-4 Super Galeb on display at the 1991 Paris air show

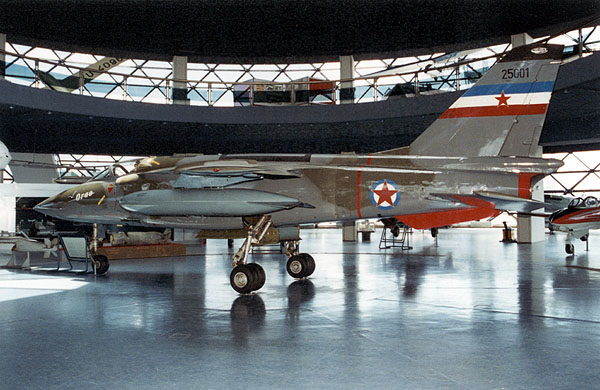
Yugoslavian J-22 Orao exhibited in the Museum of Aviation in Belgrade

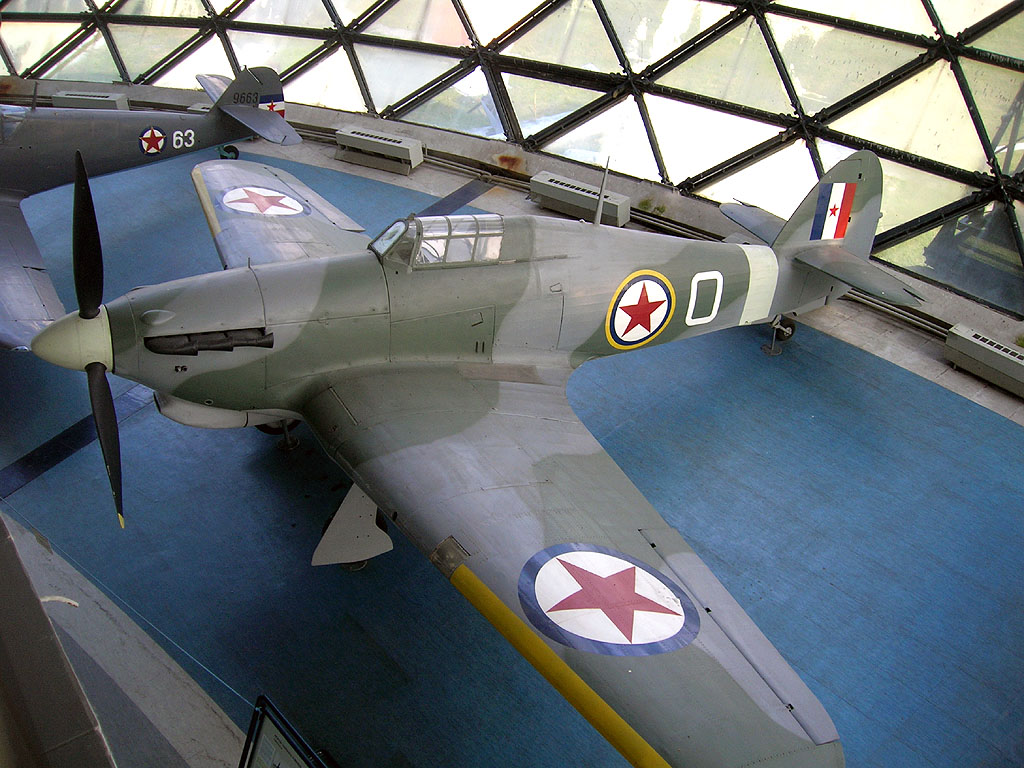
Hawker Hurricane Mk IVRP with Yugoslav Air Force markings

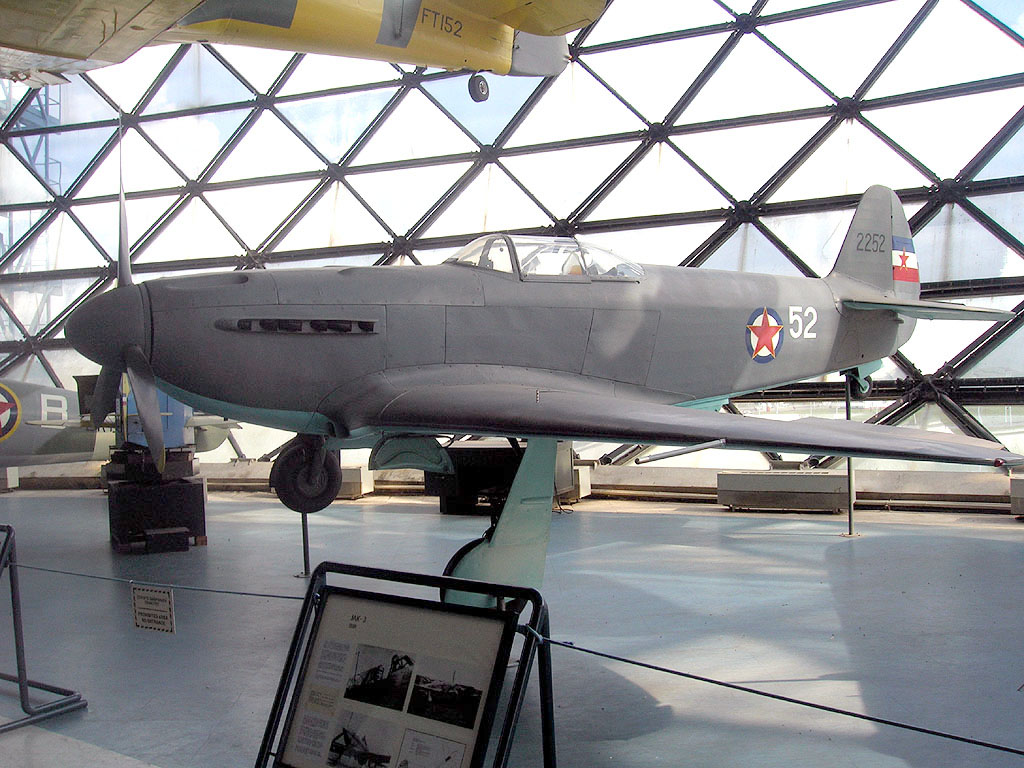
Yak-3

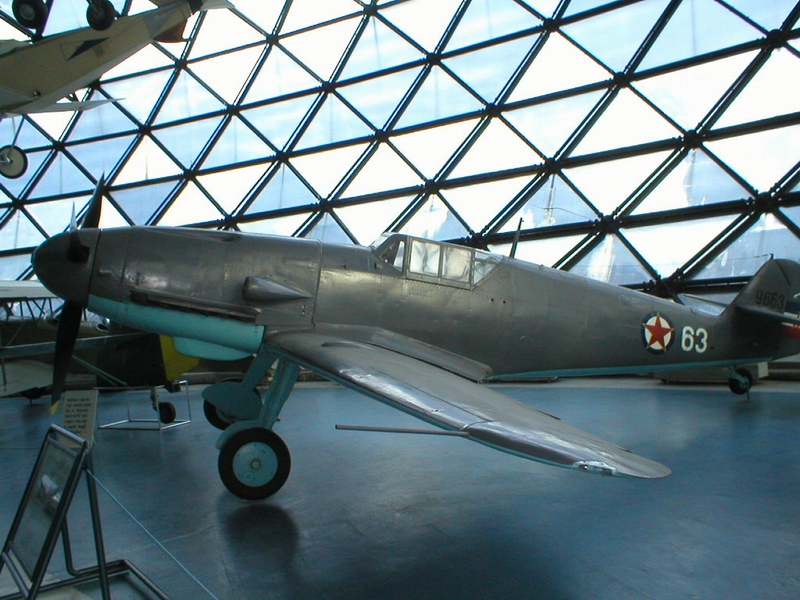
Messerschmitt Bf 109 with Yugoslav Air Force markings

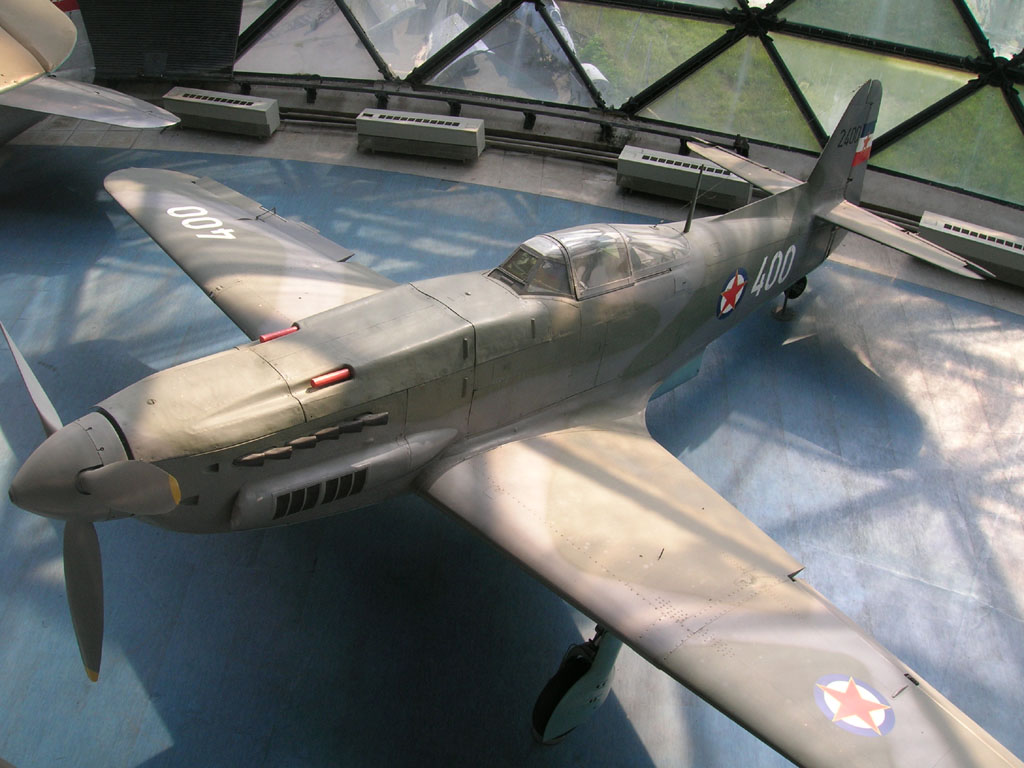
Ikarus S-49, one of the first fighter aircraft produced in Yugoslavia after WWII, was based on the pre-war Rogozarski IK-3.

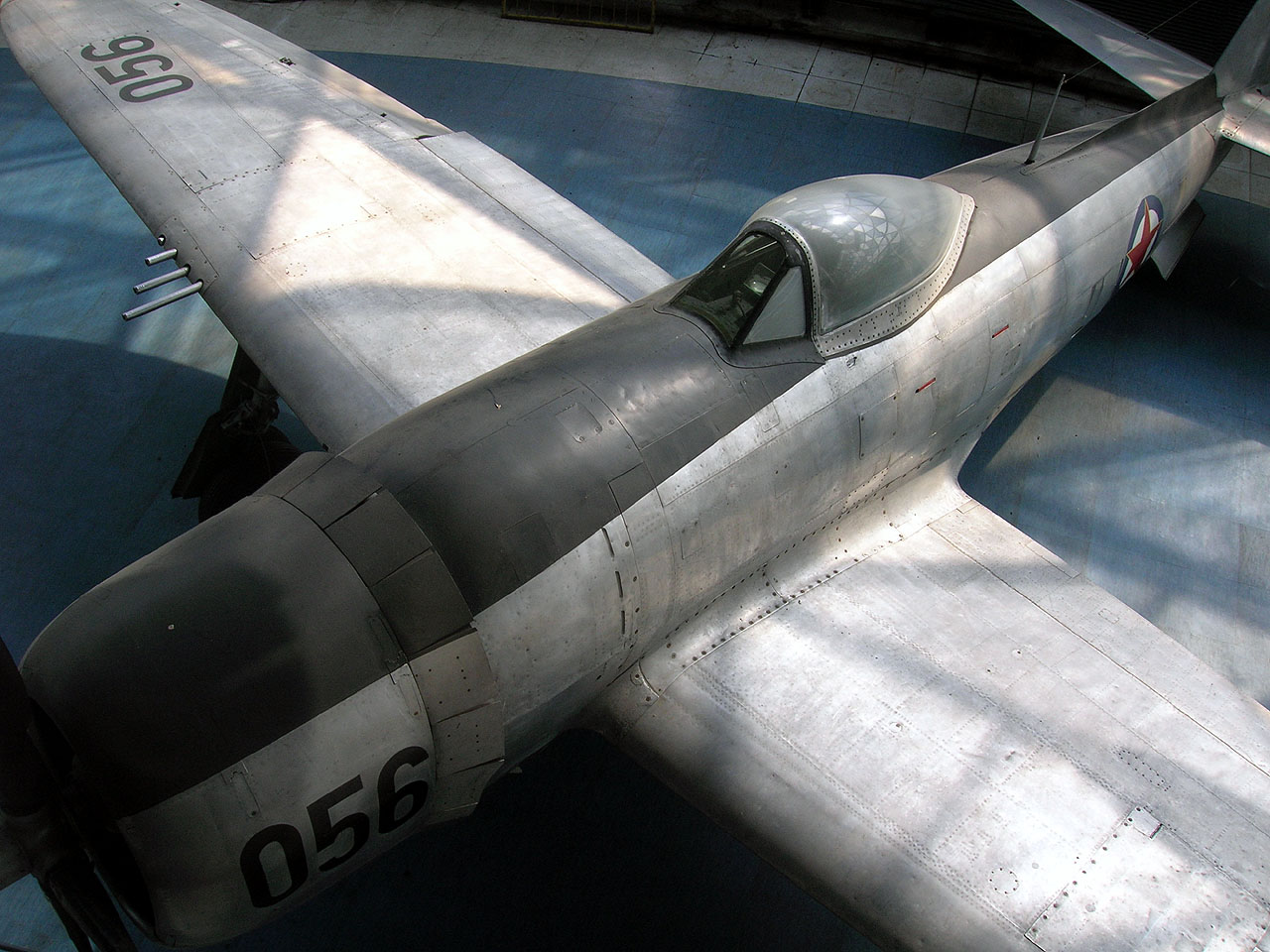
Republic P-47D Thunderbolt with Yugoslav Air Force markings.

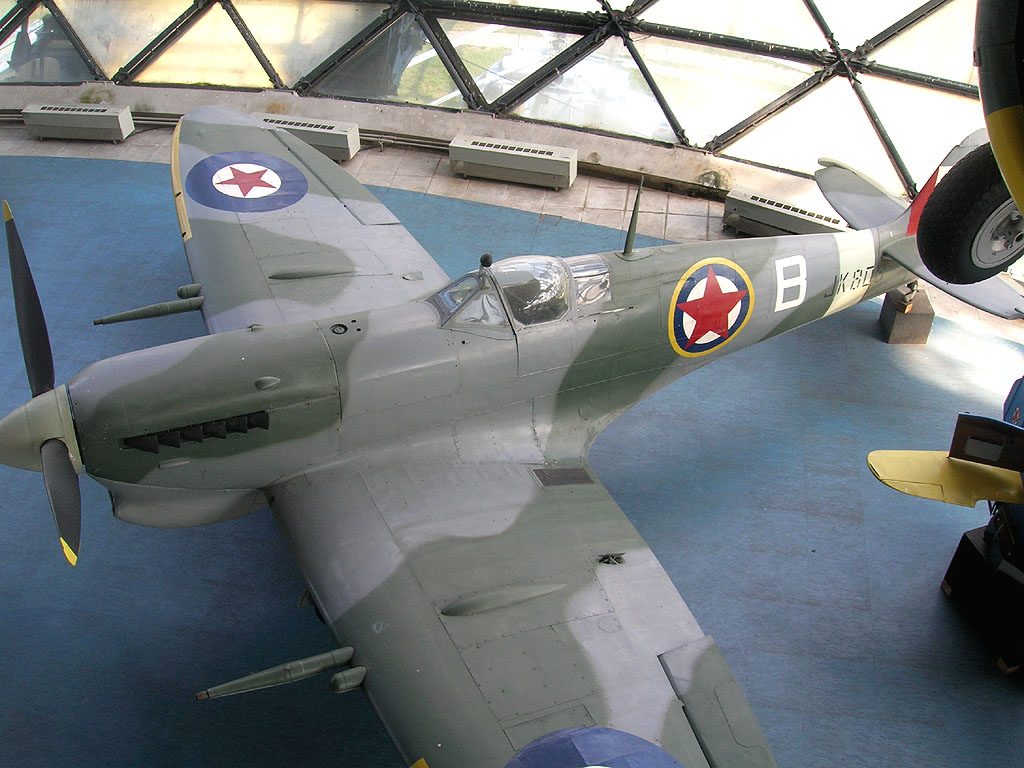
Supermarine Spitfire LF Mk VC used by Yugoslav RAF squadron.

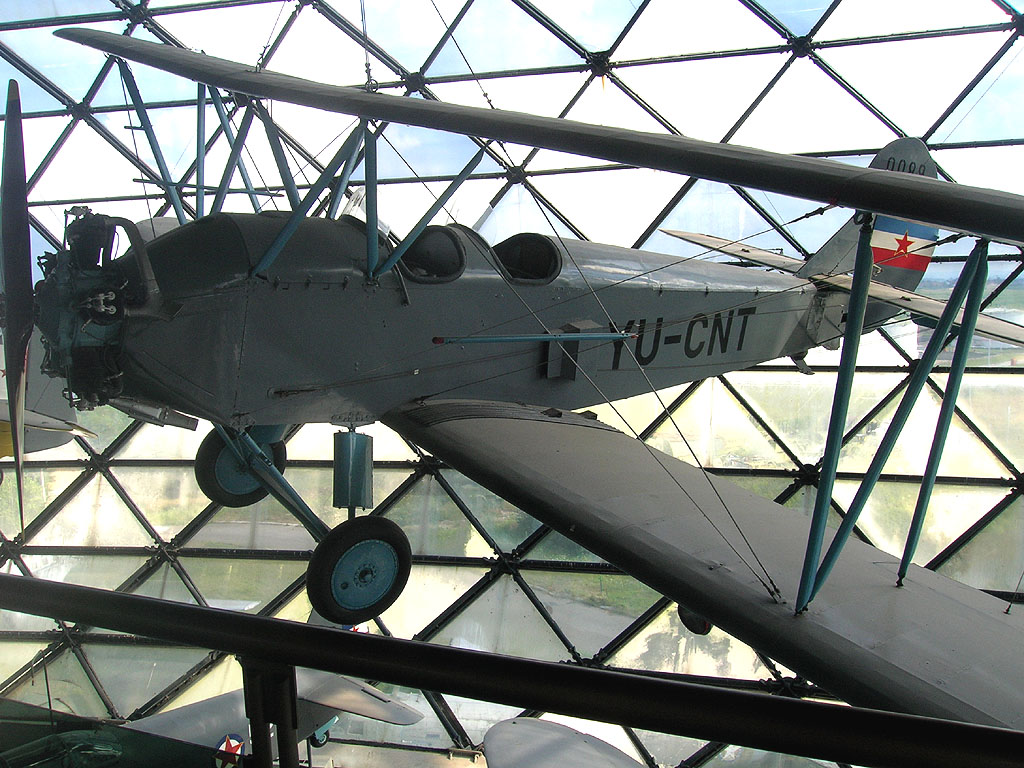
Polikarpov Po-2

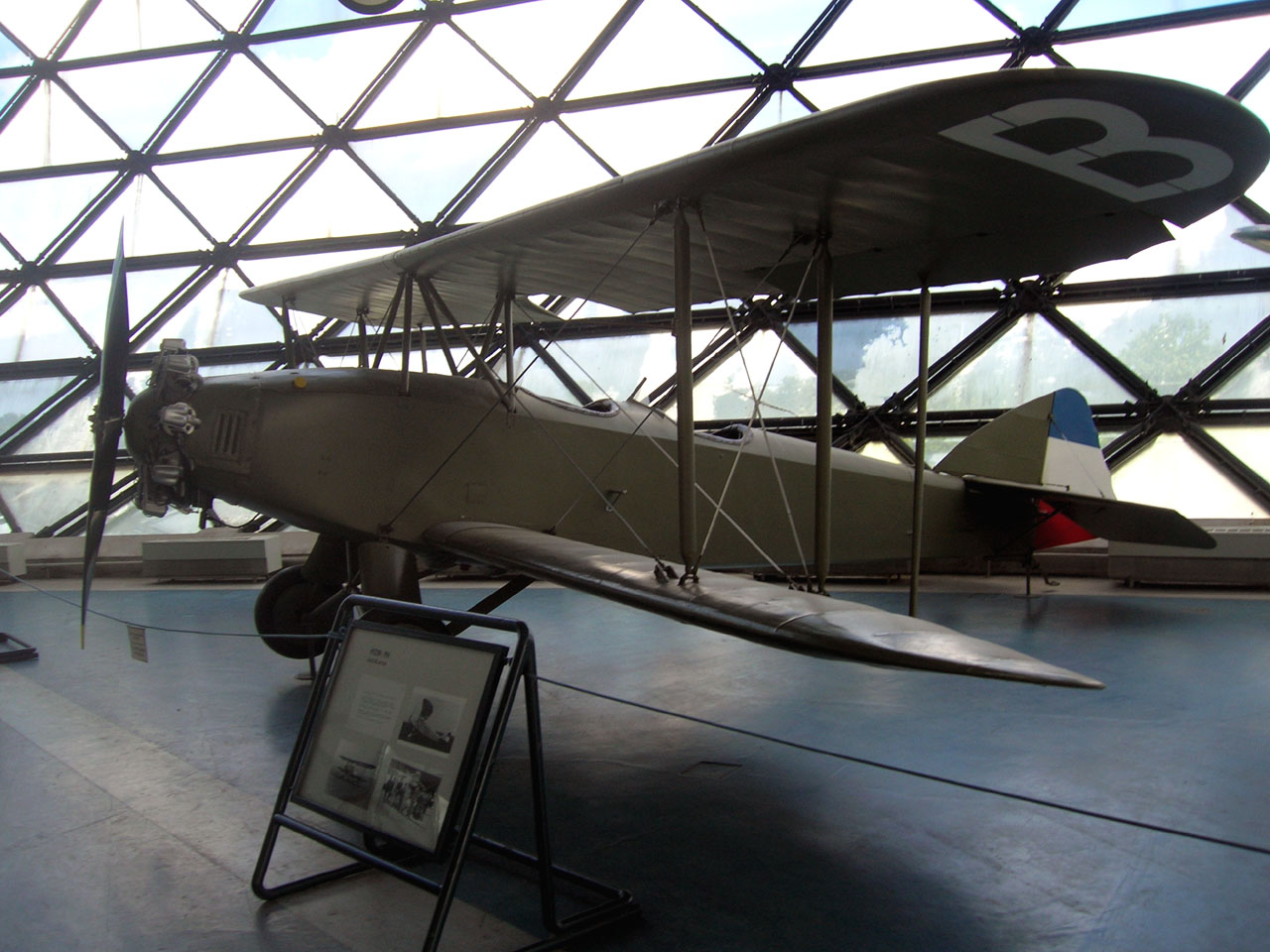
Fizir FN

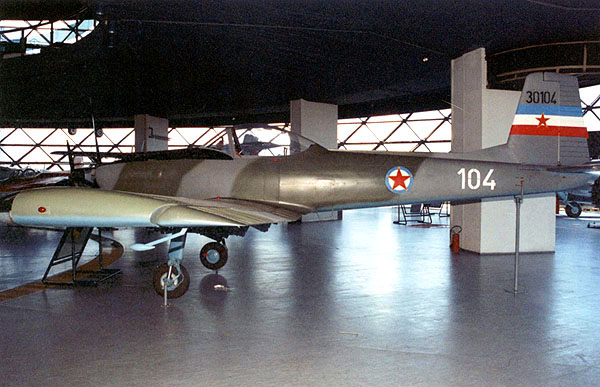
Soko J-20 Kraguj

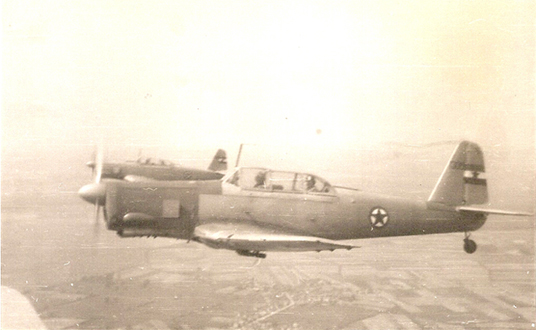
Utva-213

== Commanders ==
- Franc Pirc (1944–1946)
- Zdenko Ulepič (1946–1965)
- Viktor Bubanj (1965–1970)
- Milan Simović (1970–1972)
- Enver Ćemalović (1972–1979)
- Stevan Roglić (1979–1981)
- Slobodan Alagić (1981–1985)
- Anton Tus (1985–1991)
- Zvonko Jurjević (1991–1992)
- Božidar Stefanović (1992)

== Air forces from the former Yugoslavia ==
- Air Force of Serbia and Montenegro
- (Serbia) Serbian Air Force and Air Defence
- (Montenegro) Montenegrin Air Force
- (Croatia) Croatian Air Force
- (Republic of Serbian Krajina) 105th Aviation Brigade
- (Slovenia) Slovenian Air Force and Air Defence
- Air Force and Anti-Aircraft Defence of Bosnia and Herzegovina
- Republika Srpska Air Force
- North Macedonia Air Brigade

== See also ==
- Glasnik RV i PVO
- Krila Armije
- List of Yugoslav Air Force regiments and brigades
- Novi Avion
