= Milenko Pavlović =

Yugoslav fighter pilot (1959–1999)

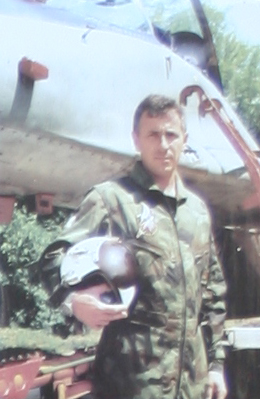
- Born: 5 October 1959; Gornje Crniljevo, FPR Yugoslavia
- Died: 4 May 1999 (aged 39); Valjevo, FR Yugoslavia
- Burial place: Bežanija Cemetery, Belgrade, Serbia
- Military career
- Allegiance: SFR Yugoslavia; FR Yugoslavia
- Branch: Yugoslav War Air Force
- Service years: 1982–1999
- Rank: Colonel (posthumously)
- Nickname: The Icarus from Podgorina
- Commands: 204th Fighter Aviation Regiment
- Conflicts: Kosovo War; NATO bombing of Yugoslavia; Air Battle of Valjevo †
- Awards: Order of Bravery

Milenko Pavlović (Serbian Cyrillic: Миленко Павловић; 5 October 1959 – 4 May 1999) was a Yugoslav fighter pilot who fought in the Kosovo War and came to prominence after he was killed during the NATO bombing of Yugoslavia.

== Early life ==
Pavlović was born to parents Milorad and Radmila Pavlović, in the village of Gornje Crniljevo on 5 October 1959. He finished the first four grades of primary school in his hometown, and the next four in Osečina. He finished high school in Mostar. Although he initially rejected the possibility, he later decided to become a military pilot.

== Death and legacy ==
On 4 May 1999, a lone Yugoslav MiG-29 flown by Pavlović attempted to intercept a large NATO formation that was returning to base having just bombed Valjevo (where Pavlović grew up). It was engaged by a pair of USAF F-16CJs from the 78th Fighter Squadron and shot down with an AIM-120, killing Pavlović.

Originally, a younger pilot was intended to scramble the MiG-29 before Pavlović himself pulled the younger pilot out of the cockpit before he would take off, allegedly telling the younger pilot that he 'was not going to die', but that Pavlović himself would.

Streets in Novi Sad, Valjevo, Batajnica, Osečina and Gornje Crniljevo are named after him. On 26 June 2019, the Batajnica Air Base was renamed in his honor.

== Personal life ==
He was married to Slavica and had two sons: Srđan and Nemanja (b. 1990) who is a former footballer.

== See also ==
- Zoran Radosavljević
