= Flying Stars =

Flying Stars may refer to:

- Flying Stars, was the aerobatic team of Yugoslavia.
- Flying Star Feng Shui, one of the techniques used in Feng shui.
