= Zoran Radosavljević (pilot) =

Yugoslav/Serbian fighter pilot

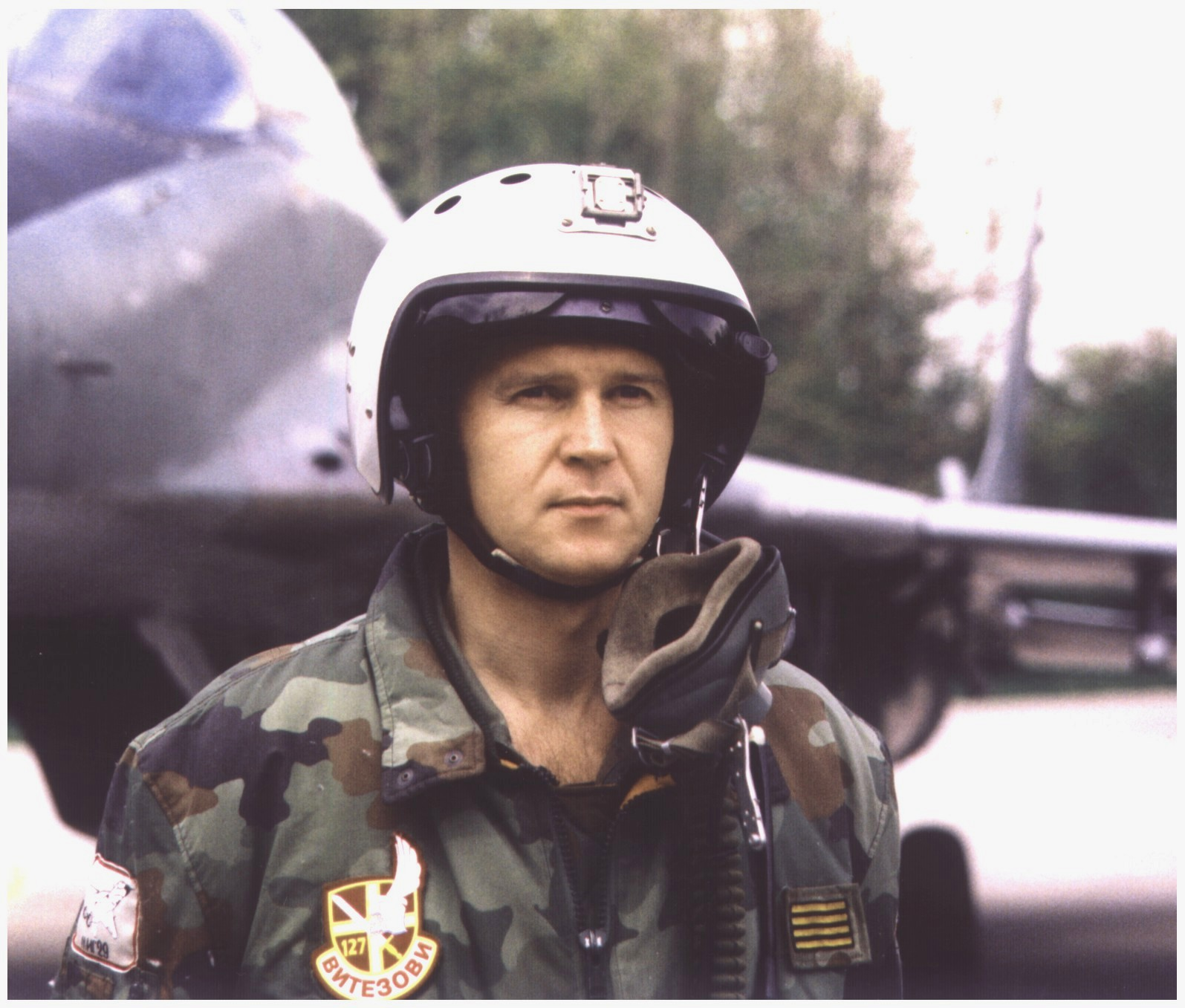
- Radosavljević in 1997
- Born: 26 February 1965; Priština, SFR Yugoslavia
- Died: 26 March 1999 (aged 34); Donja Trnova, Bosnia and Herzegovina
- Burial place: Lešće Cemetery, Belgrade, Serbia
- Military career
- Allegiance: SFR Yugoslavia; FR Yugoslavia
- Branch: Yugoslav War Air Force
- Service years: 1986–1999
- Rank: Major (posthumously)
- Nickname: Zoki
- Conflicts: Kosovo War; NATO bombing of Yugoslavia; Aircraft chase from Batajnica †
- Awards: Order of Bravery

Zoran Radosavljević (Serbian Cyrillic: Зоран Радосављевић; 26 February 1965 – 26 March 1999) was a Yugoslav fighter pilot who fought in the Kosovo War and came to prominence after he was killed during the NATO bombing of Yugoslavia.

== Early life ==
Radosavljević was born on 26 February 1965 in Pristina, Socialist Autonomous Province of Kosovo, Socialist Republic of Serbia, Socialist Federal Republic of Yugoslavia. Since his father Svetozar was an officer of the Yugoslav People's Army, Zoran, together with his mother Radojka and sister Snežana, often moved. He spent his childhood throughout the former Yugoslavia, from Skopje, Kruševac to Belgrade. He graduated from the Starina Novak Elementary School in Belgrade.

Afterwards, he enrolled in the military high school, and then in the Aviation Academy. He was educated at the Marshal Tito General Aviation Military High School in Mostar, and then at the Aviation Military Academy in Pula and Zadar. After graduating from the military academy, he began his career as a military pilot in Belgrade in 1986 as a fighter pilot on a MiG-21 plane. In 1992, he was promoted to the rank of captain of the first class. In the same year, he completed retraining on a MiG-29 plane and became the youngest pilot in the squadron of MiG-29s in the Yugoslav Air Force.

In 1996, he enrolled in postgraduate studies at the University of Belgrade Faculty of Transportation where he received his master's degree in June 1998. He became one of the leading experts in Serbia and Yugoslavia in the field of satellite navigation. In 1999, he prepared his doctorate.

== Death and legacy ==
At the beginning of the NATO bombing of Yugoslavia, on 24 March 1999, Radosavljević was a member of the 127th Fighter Aviation "Vitezovi" Squadron, which was located at the Batajnica Air Base. On 26 March 1999, two days after the bombing began, Radosavljević and his colleague Colonel Slobodan Perić were ordered to take off and oppose NATO aviation. The Yugoslav Army's MiG-29 planes were in semi-working condition, incapable of air combat. The radar range of the NATO plane was 120 km, while the range of the MiG-29 was half that. After initially avoiding NATO missiles, they were both hit by a missile fired by American pilot Jeff Hwang. Perić survived but Radosavljević did not.

According to the official version of events, Radosavljević was shot down in the wider region of Loznica, but the wreckage and his body were found immediately in the evening by two teenage boys not far from Teočak near Bijeljina in the region of Majevica, in the territory of Republika Srpska. Perić was also shot down with Radosavljević but survived by catapulting out of his plane. The fuselage was on a meadow, the beak on one mountain, and Radosavljević's body still in the seat on the other. The teenagers wrapped his body in a blanket and handed him over to the Army of Republika Srpska who then took him on foot across the field to the hospital in Loznica. He had no children and was not married. He was interred three days later at the Lešće Cemetery in Belgrade.

Radosavljević was posthumously awarded the Order of Bravery and promoted by decree of his commander. Today, the main street in Batajnica is named after him. Since 1999, the Faculty of Transportation he attended has been renamed after him and has been awarding an annual prize for the best student in Air Traffic. Posthumously, at the Batajnica airport, an award is given every year, which bears his name to the best department.

== See also ==
- Milenko Pavlović
