= Knjaz Danilo Airbase =

Airbase in Podgorica, Montenegro

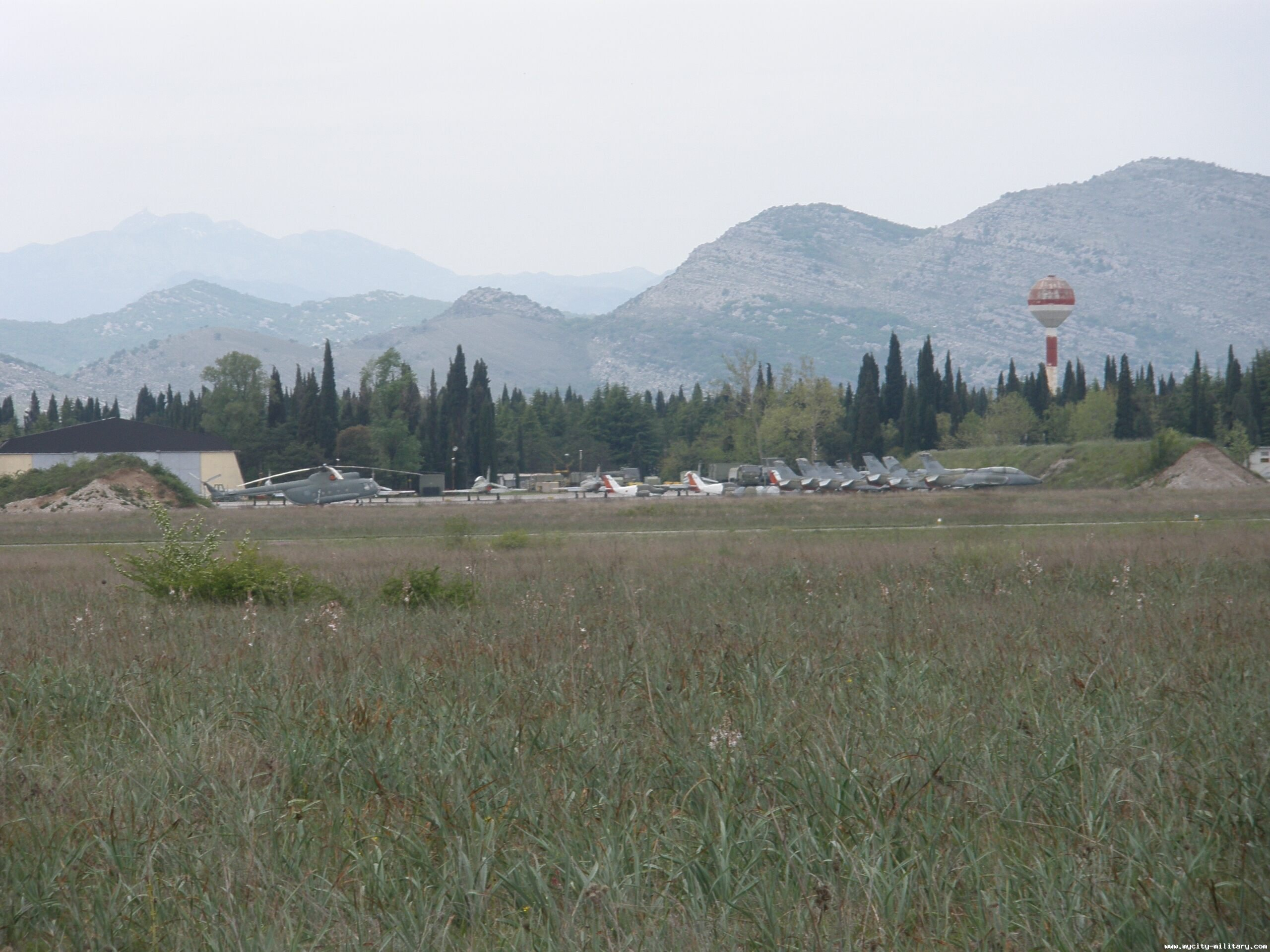
- IATA: none; ICAO: LYPJ

Summary
- Airport type: Military airbase
- Operator: Military of Montenegro
- Location: Golubovci, Zeta
- Elevation AMSL: 118 ft / 36 m
- Coordinates: 42°21′34″N 19°15′07″E
- Interactive map of Knjaz Danilo Airbase

Runways
| Direction | Length | | Surface |
| Direction | ft | m | Surface |
|---|---|---|---|
| 18/36 | 8,202 | 2,500 | Asphalt |
| ~~08/26~~ | ~~7,145~~ | ~~2,178~~ | Asphalt |

The Knjaz Danilo Airbase (Montenegrin: Vojni aerodrom Knjaz Danilo) is a Montenegrin Air Force base, located in Golubovci, Montenegro. Airbase and adjacent Podgorica Airport share a common runway and various support facilities. It is named after Knjaz Danilo, a prominent 19th-century ruler of Montenegro.

During the Yugoslav era, it was the home to the 172nd Aviation Brigade of Yugoslav Air Force and its main flying training base for primary and basic pilot training.

In addition to the airbase proper and adjacent apron, military facilities included Šipčanik complex – underground aircraft shelter tunneled into the eponymous hill, as well as 6-kilometer-long (20,000 ft) taxiway, connecting the complex to main runway. In an emergency, jets stored in the shelter could scramble using the wider, northern section of the taxiway. As Montenegro Air Force does not operate fixed wing aircraft, entire Šipčanik complex was decommissioned and converted to civilian use in early 2000s.

Airbase facilities were a frequent target of NATO bombing of Yugoslavia. G-4 Super Galeb aircraft used by Leteće zvezde aerobatic team were destroyed on the airbase premises during the strikes.

== See also ==
- Entrance in Šipčanik underground aircraft shelter
- Podgorica Airport
- Military of Montenegro
