= Soko G-4 Super Galeb =

Aircraft in Yugoslavia

G-4 Super Galeb
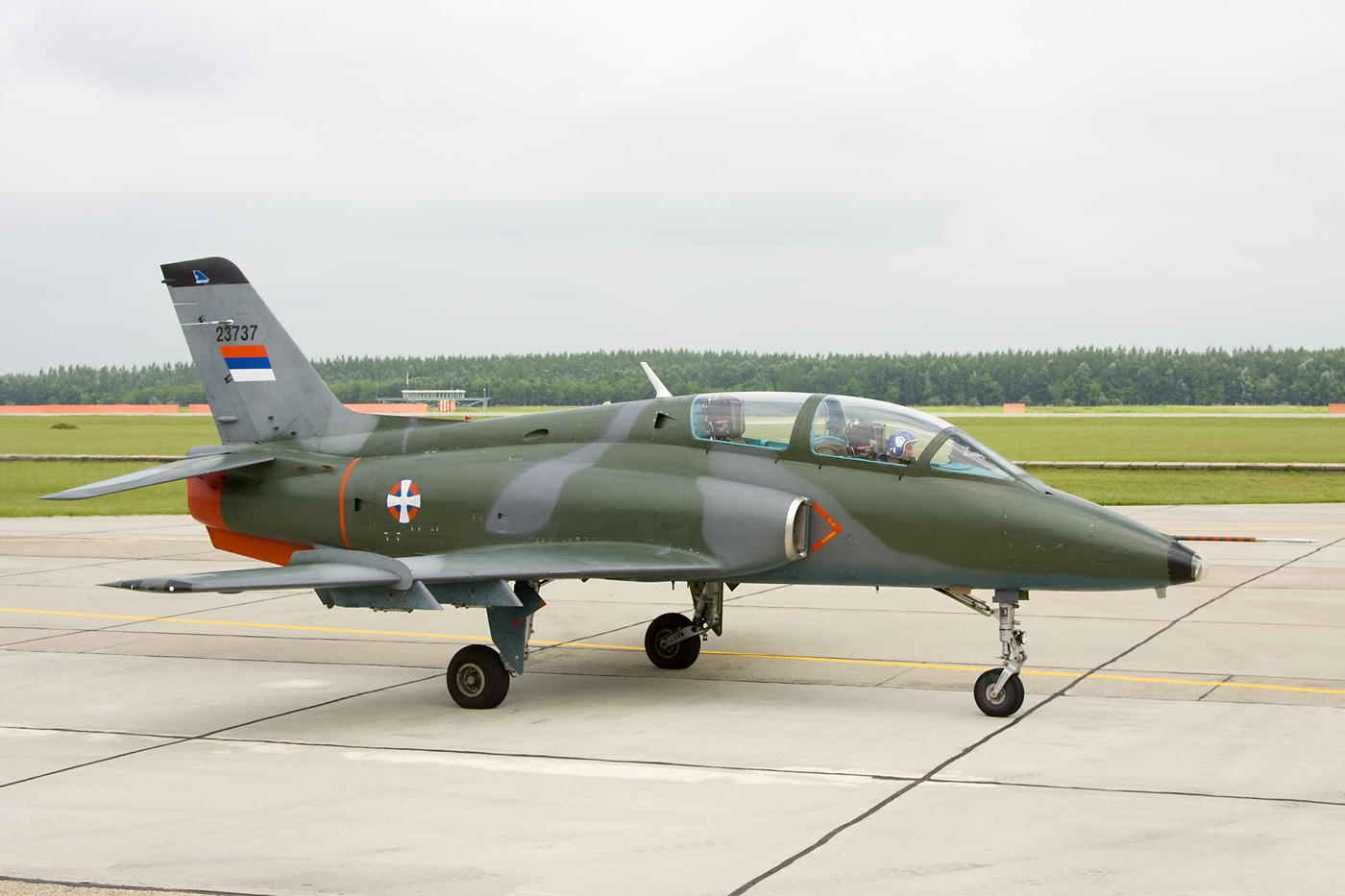
- Serbian Air Force G-4 Super Galeb

General information
- Type: Military trainer aircraft
- National origin: Yugoslavia
- Manufacturer: SOKO
- Designer: Aeronautical Technical Institute
- Status: In service
- Primary users: Serbian Air Force Myanmar Air Force; Montenegrin Air Force (historical); Yugoslav Air Force (historical)
- Number built: 85

History
- Manufactured: 1984–1991
- Introduction date: 1983
- First flight: 17 July 1978

The Soko G-4 Super Galeb (from Serbian: галеб, lit. 'seagull'), also referred to as N-62, is a Yugoslav single-engine, advanced jet trainer and light ground-attack aircraft designed by the Aeronautical Technical Institute at Žarkovo and manufactured by the SOKO aircraft factory in Mostar.

The Super Galeb was developed during the 1970s as a successor to, and replacement of, the Soko G-2 Galeb then in service with the Yugoslav Air Force (Serbian: Ratno vazduhoplovstvo i protivvazdušna odbrana – RV i PVO; Croatian: Ratno zrakoplovstvo i protuzračna obrana – RZ i PZO). On 17 July 1978, the maiden flight was performed by a development aircraft, designated G-4 PPP; during 1983, the first G-4 made its first flight. Quantity production of the type commenced in 1984; the assembly line operated up until the breakup of Yugoslavia in 1991. A total of 85 aircraft were built, most of which went into service with the Yugoslav Air Force, although six G-4s were exported to Myanmar.

During the Yugoslav Wars, RV i PVO G-4s carried out ground-attack sorties, a total of four were recorded as having been lost to enemy air defences. During 1992, the remaining aircraft were relocated to Serbia and Montenegro where they entered service with the Air Force of the newly formed FR Yugoslavia. A single G-4 was left over for the Republika Srpska Air Force. The Serbian Air Force has become the largest operator of the type, having acquired further Super Galebs from other ex-Yugoslavian republics. It intends to upgrade and operate its G-4s through to the 2030s.

== Development ==
The G-4 Super Galeb was developed during the 1970s as a replacement for Yugoslav Air Force's existing fleet of the G-2 Galeb, a straight-winged jet trainer aircraft that had been developed during the late 1950s. Prior to 1999, the Galeb was the most commonly used trainer operated by the Yugoslav Air Force. According to aviation periodical Flight International, the Super Galeb showed unmistakable lineage from the earlier G-2, sharing the same British-sourced Rolls-Royce Viper turbojet engine, albeit uprated for greater performance. However, aviation historian Christopher Chant notes that: "the Super Galeb bears no more relation to the G-2 Galeb than an identity of role, being an altogether more advanced aircraft.

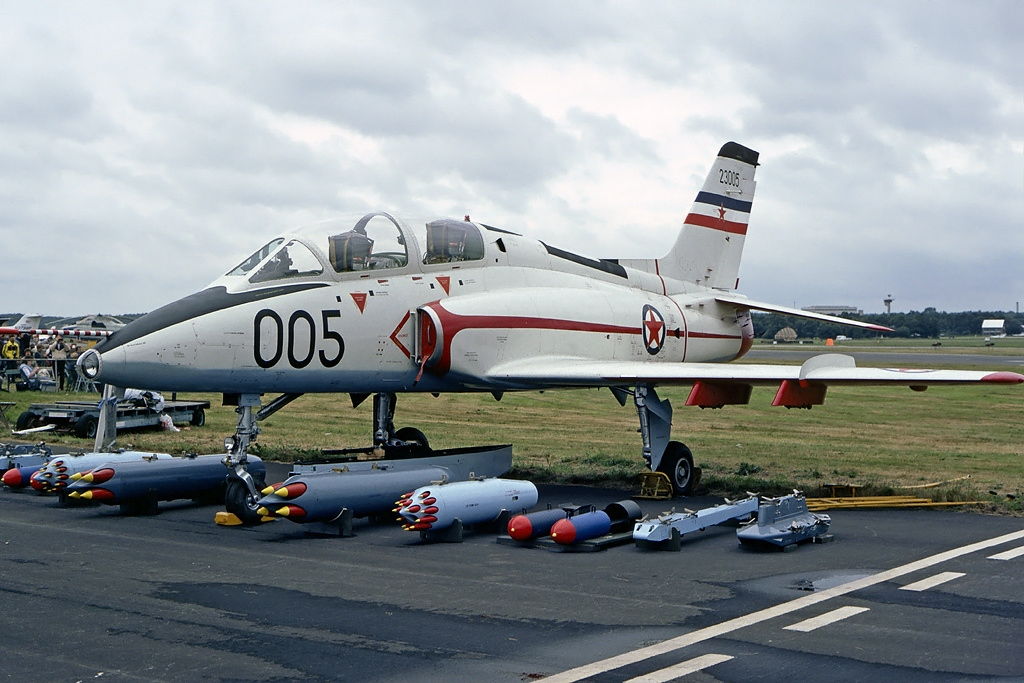
Yugoslav Air Force (serial 23005) at the Farnborough Airshow, 1984

The first of two prototypes had been reportedly completed by early 1978. Following completion of the initial ground testing phase, the Super Galeb's maiden flight was conducted on 17 July 1978. It was followed by the first flight of one of the six pre-production aircraft on 17 December 1980. These pre-production aircraft, along with the first prototype, were designated G-4 PPP; they possessed fixed tailplanes with inset elevators and no anhedral. Unlike the G-2 Galeb, both the wing and tail surfaces are swept on the Super Galeb, while avionics to enable flight even under adverse weather conditions and at night have been integrated.

In contrast to the development aircraft, production Super Galebs, along with the second prototype, were designated G-4; in terms of design, they differed by featured an all-moving anhedral tailplane as well as being equipped with comprehensive avionics improvements. Production aircraft use a gravity-based refuelling system, while the earlier development aircraft had been furnished with a pressurised refuelling system; this was slightly slower to refuel but was both simpler and cheaper. In addition to its training mission, the G-4 was also suited for light attack operations.

During 1983, the G-4 made its first flight, by which point it had been ordered in large numbers for the Yugoslav Air Force. Beyond the domestic market, it also competed internationally against jet trainers such as the Italian Aermacchi MB-339, the Czechoslovak Aero L-39 Albatros, and the Spanish CASA C-101; Flight International observes that, while the G-4 offered less performance than the French-German Dassault/Dornier Alpha Jet, it was substantially cheaper to procure. Despite attracting the interest of several countries including: Libya, Nigeria, Iraq, Malaysia, Indonesia, Turkey, and the United States (reportedly an evaluation of the G-4 was considered under the Joint Primary Aircraft Training System program), only six aircraft were delivered to Myanmar in 1991, before the breakup of Yugoslavia.

== Design ==
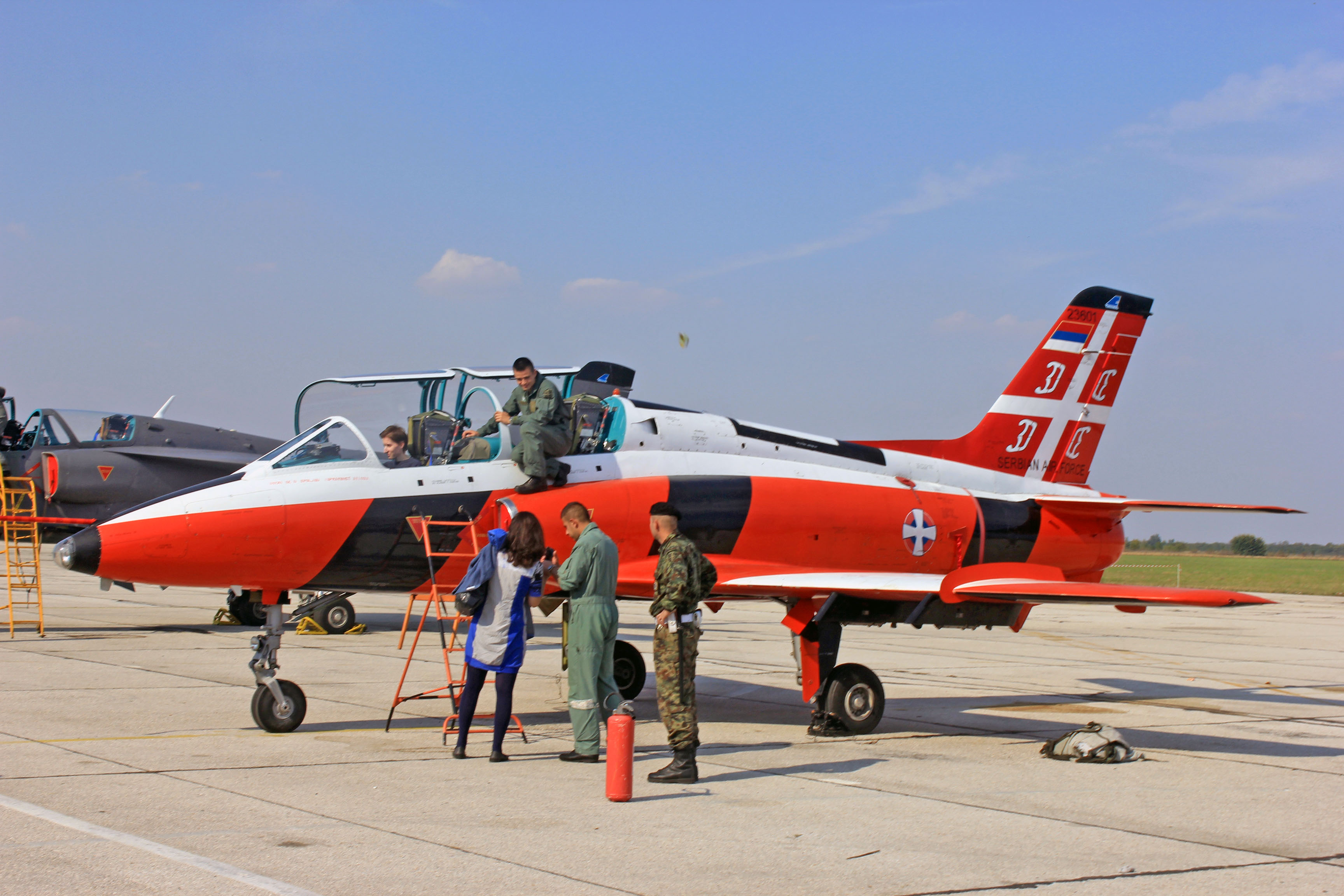
Serbian Air Force G-4 Super Galeb (serial 23601)

The SOKO G-4 Super Galeb is a jet trainer and light attack aircraft. Its size allows the type to be applied to both basic and advanced flight syllabuses. Aesthetically, the Super Galeb resembles the Hawker Siddeley Hawk, a contemporary British jet trainer. In terms of the G-4's basic configuration, it is a low wing monoplane design with slightly tapered wings. The aircraft is 12.25 metres (40.2 ft) long and 4.3 metres (14 ft) high, with a wingspan of 9.88 metres (32.4 ft). It weighs 3,250 kilograms (7,170 lb) when empty and can carry 1,882 kilograms (4,149 lb) of fuel. The aircraft is fitted with a short nose cone, rounded fuselage, conventional empennage, semi-circular air intakes, vertical tailfin, rudder, ailerons, horizontal stabilisers and fuel tanks at the square tips.

The two crew, typically student and instructor, are seated in a tandem configuration under individual side-opening canopies. Both positions are provided with Martin-Baker-sourced ejection seats; the rear seat is slightly elevated to render better all-round visibility and aid in the supervision of a student pilot sitting in the front. The crew are provided with avionics that enable poor-weather flying; the forward position is provided with a radio altimeter and gyro-gunsight. For combat missions, the Super Galeb can be outfitted with a centreline-mounted gun pod containing a twin-barrel 23mm Gryazev-Shipunov GSh-23L cannon with up to 200 rounds. In addition, four hard points are installed beneath the wings, the inboard pair having a 770-pound (350 kg) capacity while the outboard have a 550-pound (250 kg) capacity; these can carry a variety of Western and Eastern European armaments and equipment; the inboard pylons are plumbed for 70 gallon external fuel tanks, a locally developed reconnaissance pod was also under development at one stage.

The G-4 is powered by a single British-sources Rolls-Royce Viper turbojet engine. Since its introduction, the aircraft's performance has been considerably improved by the adoption of the more powerful Rolls-Royce Viper 632-46 engine. For further performance, attachment points for jet-assisted take-off (JATO) rockets are present underneath the fuselage. To shorten landing distances, a drogue parachute can be deployed. Direct access to the engine is achieved via the removal of the rear fuselage forward of the fin.

== Operational history ==
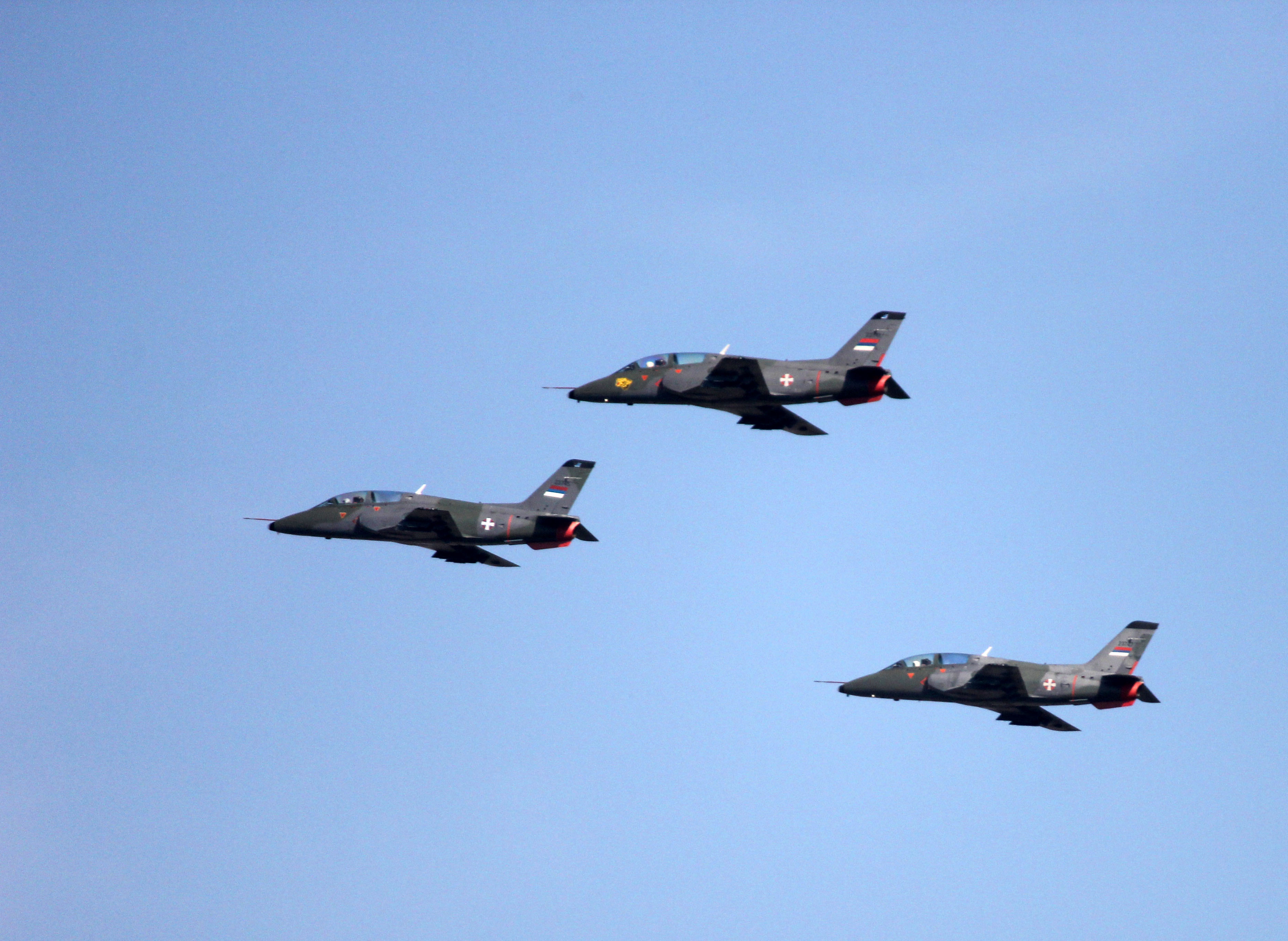
Three G-4s of the Serbian Air Force in formation flight, 2017

During the early 1990s, Yugoslavia embarked upon an upgrade programme for its G-4 fleet. Reportedly, this programme primarily revolved around the integration of new air-to-air and air-to-ground missiles, as well as an improved aiming capability, adjustments to raise engine reliability, and enhanced electronics.

In 1990, Yugoslavia agreed to sell 12 Super Galebs to the military junta of Myanmar for counter-insurgency operations in its civil war, despite international sanctions.

The bombing of the Banski Dvori occurred on 7 October 1991, as a part of a Yugoslav Air Force attack on the seat of the President of Croatia Franjo Tuđman where he met with Stjepan Mesić, then President of the Presidency of Yugoslavia and Ante Marković, then Prime Minister of Yugoslavia. Two G-4 Super Galebs struck Banski Dvori with Mark 82 bombs set off by proximity fuzes 5 metres (16 feet) above the target, scoring two direct hits.

The Air Force of Yugoslavia Super Galebs were deployed as ground-attack aircraft during the Bosnian War against muslim Bosnians before the United Nations imposed a no-fly zone in the country. On 28 February 1994, three G-4s were shot down by NATO after violating the UN decision. On 19 September 1995, two Bosnian Serb G-4 Super Galeb were shot down by Croatian 2nd Guards Brigade with 9K38 Igla in Bosanski Novi.

During the NATO bombing of Yugoslavia, 23 G-4s were destroyed on the ground with another twenty three damaged; several were later scrapped in the aftermath of the Kosovo War. Seven G-4s of the Leteće zvezde aerobatics team were destroyed at Golubovci Air Base, heavily contributing to the team disbanding during 1999. Since then, a group of Serbian aviation enthusiasts have assembled a new display team, but have equipped it with older Soko G-2 Galebs that had been previously withdrawn during the 1980s.

Since 2008, the Serbian Air Force, the largest operator of the type, has proposed a comprehensive upgrade of their remaining G-4Ms. Intended to be re-designated G4-MD, the envisioned upgrade programme, which largely revolves around new avionics for improved navigation, greater ease of control, and integrate new combat systems, is reportedly set to extend the type's service life through to the 2030s. Serbia has been able to acquire additional G-4s from other former Yugoslavian republics, often by bartering, to expand its operational fleet.

== Variants ==
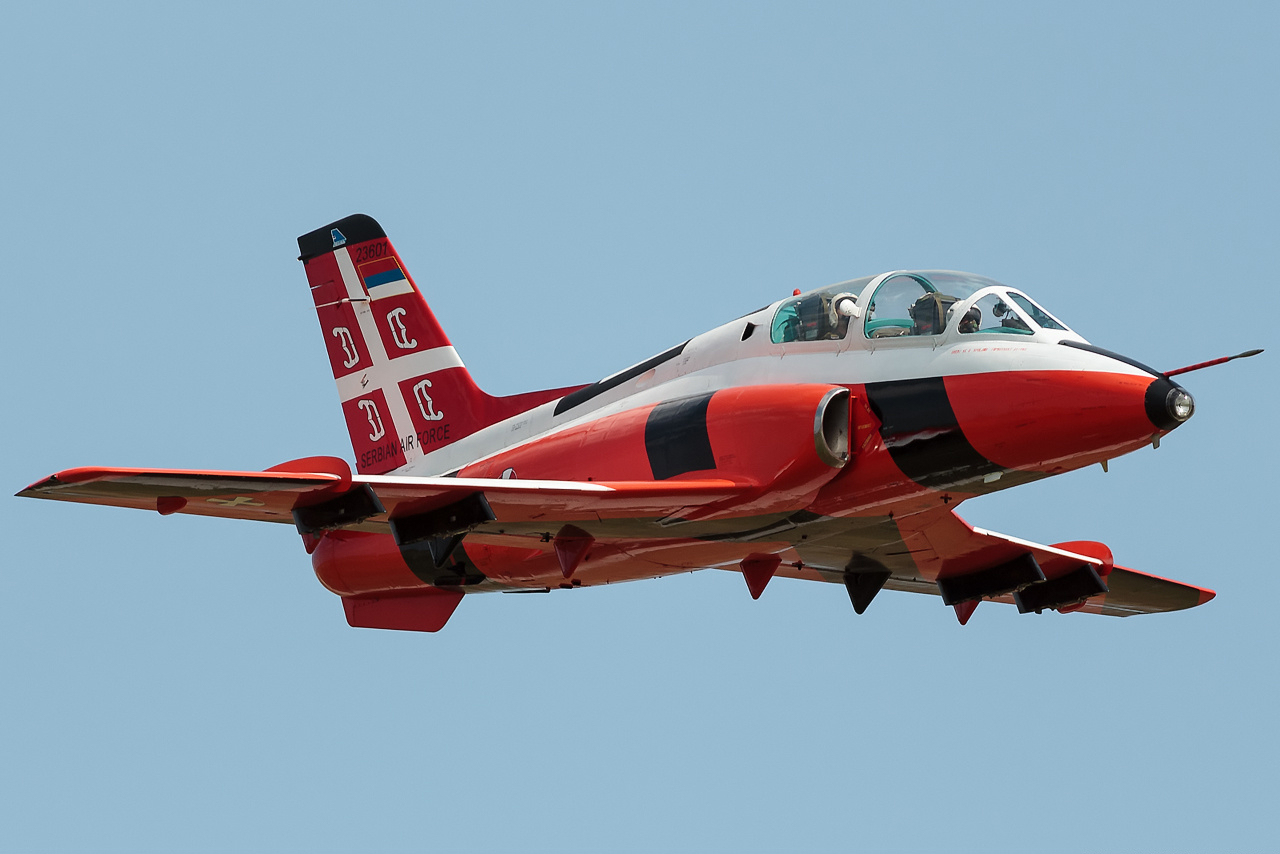
Serbian Air Force G-4T (serial 23601) used as a target tug

- G-4 − 85 aircraft produced and deployed; advanced jet trainer and light ground-attack aircraft.
- G-4Š − 5 aircraft produced; unarmed jet trainer.
- G-4T − Target tug model.
- G-4M − 4 aircraft; upgraded avionics and hardpoints, missile rail added to wingtips. Avionics include a Zrak ENP-MG4 HUD incorporating a Rudi Čajavec ENS-MG4 electronic sight, a gyro platform, multifunction displays, and an optional chaff/flare dispensers. The inner hardpoints are rated at 500 kg, while the outer ones are rated at 350 kg, giving a maximum disposable load of 1,800 kg. Normal takeoff weight is 4,971 kg as a trainer, with a maximum takeoff weight of 6,400 kg in the attacker configuration, the maximum speed in "clean" configuration is 865 km/h at 10,000 m and 900 km/h at 4,000 m, with a ferry range of 2,900 km with drop tanks; range of 1,800 km with standard fuel, reduced to 1,200 km with cannon pack, four BL755 cluster bombs and two AAMs, maximum rate of climb at sea level of 1,800 m per minute, and a service ceiling of 12,500 m.
- G-4MD − planned modernization on 15 aircraft includes: LCD flight screens, HOTAS, HUD, integrated mission computers, distance measuring equipment, GPS-based navigation systems, identification friend or foe, navcomm units, mission records, and VHF omni-range and instrument landing systems; integration of guided weapons, countermeasures and targeting systems is also scheduled as part of the upgrade.
- Turga − Unofficial designation of a prototype designed to meet Turkish specifications.

== Operators ==
Bosnia and Herzegovina

- Air Force and Anti-Aircraft Defence of Bosnia and Herzegovina − inherited 1 G-4 aircraft from Republika Srpska. At one point, Bosnia was considering its sale to neighbouring Serbia.

Montenegro

- Montenegrin Air Force − inherited 17 aircraft. Four of these were used, but have subsequently been put up for sale. By 2012, six aircraft were transferred to Serbia whilst seven were reportedly sold to a private operator.

Serbia

- Serbian Air Force − 16 as of December 2025

Myanmar

- Myanmar Air Force − 5 as of December 2025

Yugoslavia

- Yugoslav Air Force − 25 Super Galebs in the ground attack role plus 70 Super Galebs and Soko J-21 Jastrebs in the training role as of 1991. Passed on to successor states

== Aircraft on display ==
Serbia

- Aeronautical Museum Belgrade – four Soko G-4 Super Galeb on display

== Specifications (G-4M) ==
Data from Jane's All The World's Aircraft 1993–94, A Compendium of Armaments and Military Hardware

General characteristics

- Crew: 2
- Length: 12.25 m (40 ft 2 in)
- Wingspan: 9.88 m (32 ft 5 in)
- Height: 4.30 m (14 ft 1 in)
- Wing area: 19.5 m^{2} (210 sq ft)
- Aspect ratio: 5.01
- Empty weight: 3,250 kg (7,165 lb)
- Gross weight: 4,760 kg (10,494 lb)
- Max takeoff weight: 6,330 kg (13,955 lb)
- Fuel capacity: 1,882 kg (maximum internal and external fuel)
- Powerplant: 1 × Rolls-Royce Viper 632-46 turbojet, 17.8 kN (4,000 lbf) thrust

Performance

- Maximum speed: 910 km/h (565 mph, 491 kn) clean at 6,000 m (13,000 ft)
- Cruise speed: 550 km/h (340 mph, 300 kn) at 6,000m
- Stall speed: 180 km/h (97 mph, 112 kn) (flaps and undercarriage down)
- Never exceed speed: 921 km/h (572 mph, 497 kn) 0.9M at 11,000 m
- Range: 1,900 km (1,200 mi, 1,000 nmi) Internal fuel
- Combat range: 1,300 km (810 mi, 700 nmi) with cannon pack and four BL755 cluster bombs (combat radius 485 km)
- Ferry range: 2,500 km (1,553 mi, 1,349 nmi) maximum internal and external fuel
- Service ceiling: 12,850 m (42,160 ft) Service ceiling (Altitude at which maximum climb rate reduces to 100 ft/min)
- g limits: -4.2 to +8
- Rate of climb: 31 m/s (6,100 ft/min)
- Time to altitude: 6 minutes to 8,000m

Armament

- 1 × GSh-23L 23 mm cannon in ventral gun pod.
- 2 × inner pylons 350 kg (770 lb) capacity.
- 2 × outer pylons 250 kg (550 lb) capacity.
- 1 × centerline pylon 400 kg (880 lb) capacity (G-4M).
- 2 × wingtip missile rails (G-4M).

Avionics
Standard communication and navigation equipment, plus (fire control and weapons management) Ferranti ISIS D-282 gyro sight, and (defensive sensors and systems) Iskra SD-1 RWR; there is also provision for a reconnaissance pod with cameras and an infrared line scanner.

== See also ==
- Leteće zvezde (flying stars – aerobatics team)

Related development

- Soko G-2 Galeb

Aircraft of comparable role, configuration, and era

- Aermacchi MB-339
- Aero L-39 Albatros
- AIDC AT-3
- BAE Systems Hawk
- CASA C-101
- Dassault/Dornier Alpha Jet
- FMA IA 63 Pampa
- IAR 99
- Kawasaki T-4
- PZL I-22 Iryda
