= Montenegrin Air Force =

Air arm of the Military of Montenegro

- Vazduhoplovstvo i protivvazdušna odbrana
- Emblem of the Montenegrin Air Force
- Founded: 2006; 20 years ago
- Country: Montenegro
- Type: Air force
- Role: Aerial warfare
- Size: 11 helicopters
- Part of: Montenegrin Armed Forces
- Headquarters: Podgorica

Commanders
- Commander-in-Chief: President Jakov Milatović

Insignia
- Roundel

- Fin flash

- Flag

Aircraft flown
- Helicopter: Bell 412, Bell 505

The Montenegrin Air Force (Montenegrin: Vazduhoplovstvo i protivvazdušna odbrana; V i PVO) is the air arm of the Military of Montenegro. The aircraft marking of the Montenegrin Air Force consist of a red-on-gold roundel, currently being the sole air arm using the latter colour in its official insignia.

== History ==
In 1991–1992, Yugoslavia disintegrated, and the republics of Serbia and Montenegro established the Federal Republic of Yugoslavia. The Air Force was renamed the Air Force of Serbia and Montenegro, (also known as the Air Force of Yugoslavia). In spring of 1999 they suffered heavy losses in NATO bombing of Yugoslavia, during the Kosovo War. After years of political turmoil, Montenegro declared its independence in June 2006, bringing an end to the state union of Serbia and Montenegro.

== Airbase ==
- Knjaz Danilo Airbase (Podgorica Airport) – Main base of operations

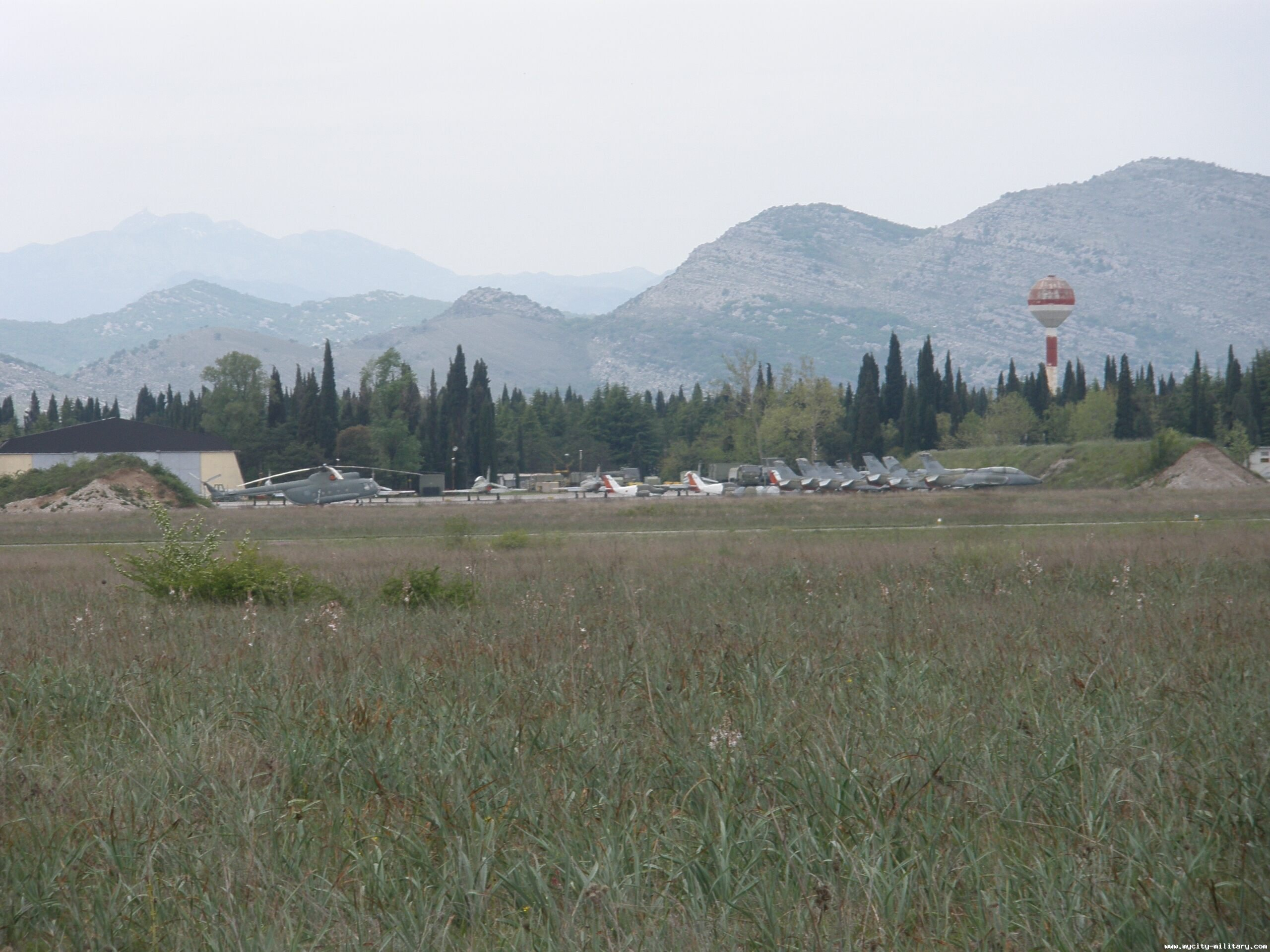
Knaj Danilo Airbase from a distance

No other permanent airbases exist, but temporary forward bases are established during fire season, in Niksic .

== Aircraft inventory ==
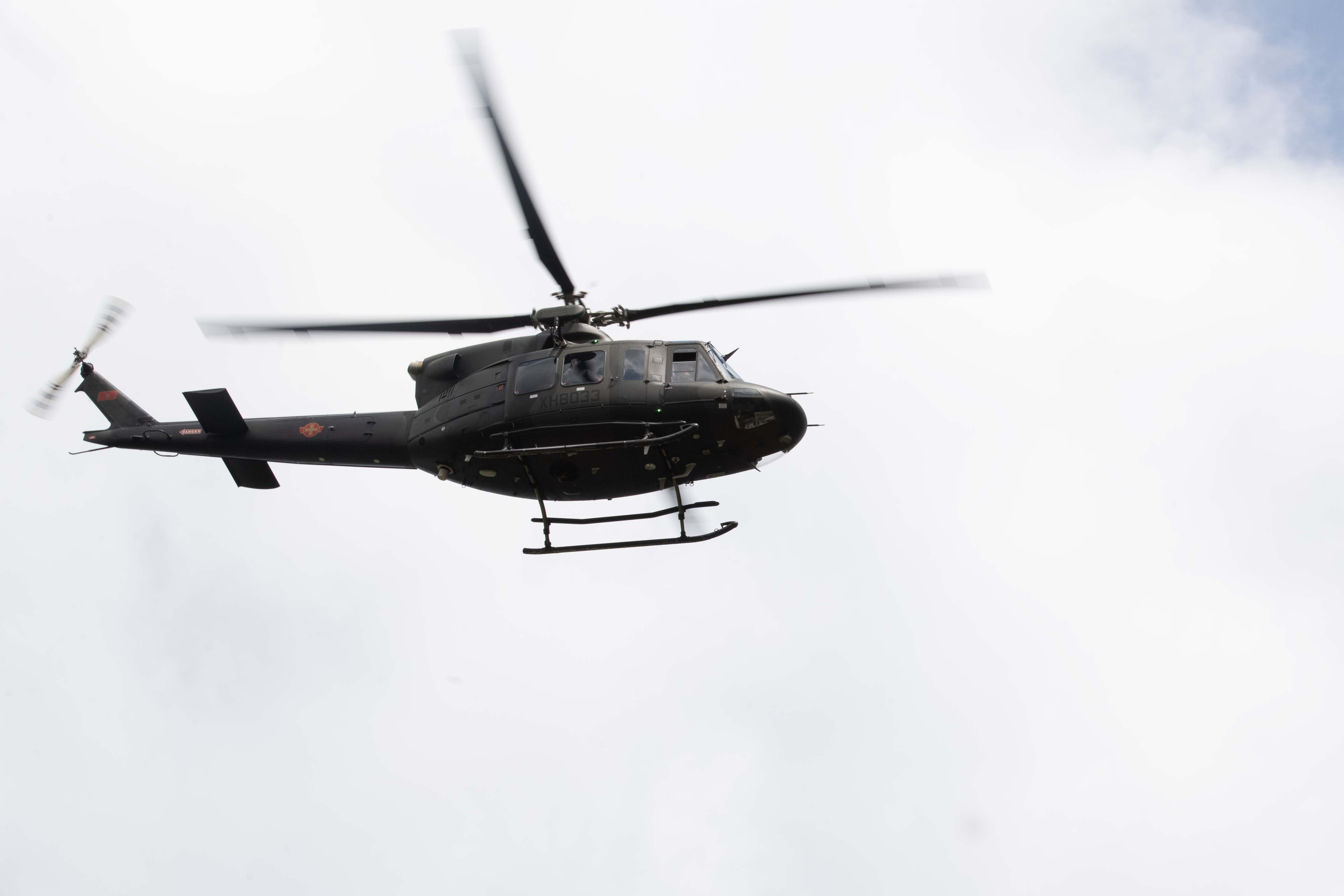
Montenegrin Air Force Bell 412 operating during NATO's Exercise Immediate Response 23

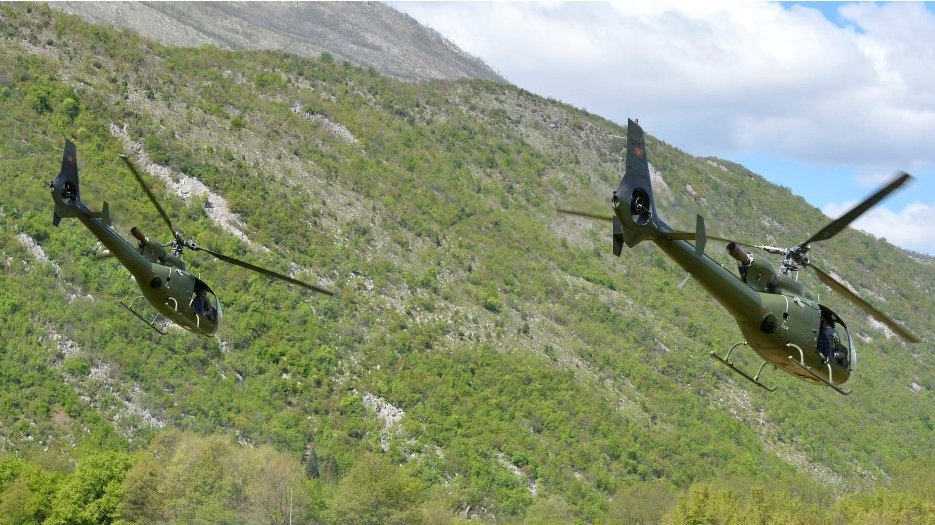
A pair of Aérospatiale Gazelle helicopters on lift off

Following the dissolution of the state union of Serbia and Montenegro, the newly formed Republic of Montenegro was left with a considerable number of aircraft at the Golubovci airbase, more than required for its own needs. After the break-up, speculation arose regarding the division of the aircraft, but the Serbian Ministry of Defense issued a statement declaring that the eventual division of the fleet was not in either country's interest. However, a total of 11 G-4 Super Galebs, of which 8 were airworthy, were still located at the base in 2008. In 2010 Serbia took delivery of six of the G-4 Super Galebs in exchange for Montenegro receiving shares in the Novi Prvoborac company, airport equipment and "various documentation". In 2012 the remaining Soko G-4s were placed into storage. A decision to sell them also came in 2012.

Since 2018, the Montenegrin Air Force has significantly enhanced its rotorcraft fleet with the acquisition of three Bell 412 helicopters. In June 2026, four Airbus Helicopters H145Ms were ordered in a deal made with the German government, to be supplied from a batch of H145Ms ordered for the German Army.

=== Current inventory ===
Aircraft	Origin	Type	Variant	In service	Notes
Helicopters
Bell 412	United States	Utility	412EPI	3	
Bell 505	United States	Utility		2	
Aérospatiale Gazelle	France; United Kingdom; Yugoslavia	Utility	SA342	6	13 placed in storage in 2019
Aircraft
Air Tractor AT-802	United States	Firefighting	AT-802F	1	Four ordered originally, only one operating as of 2025 due to accidents
Cessna 421 Golden Eagle	United States	Passenger	421B	1	

=== Retired ===
Aircraft	Origin	Type	Variant	In service	Notes
Combat aircraft
Soko G-4	Yugoslavia	Attack / Jet trainer		4	Placed in storage in 2012
Trainer aircraft
UTVA 75	Yugoslavia	Trainer		4	Retired from service in 2012
Firefighting aircraft
PZL-Mielec M-18 Dromader	Poland	Firefighting / Trainer		2	One written off in a 2015 crash Status of second unknown
Helicopters
Mil Mi-8	Soviet Union	Transport / Utility	Mi-8T	4	Retired from service in 2012

== Operational structure ==
- Helicopter squadron (Helikopterska Eskadrila) - Knjaz Danilo Airbase

The Helicopter Squadron consists of 3 sections:

- 1st (Attack) Section
- 2nd (Transport) Section
- 3rd (Utility) Section

Each of the three helicopter flights has its specific task consisting of close air support, transport and utility duties.

== Aircraft markings ==
Early roundel used in some limited examples

Roundel used from 2006 to 2018

Roundel adopted in 2018

Reduced visibility version of the 2018 roundel

== See also ==
- Knjaz Danilo Airbase
- Military of Montenegro
- Podgorica Airport
- Montenegro
