= Air Force of Serbia and Montenegro =

Yugoslav War Air Force (1992–2003) War Air Force of Serbia and Montenegro (2003–2006)
- Emblem of the Air Force of the Federal Republic of Yugoslavia
- Founded: April 27, 1992
- Disbanded: June 3, 2006
- Country: Serbia and Montenegro
- Type: Air force, air defense force
- Size: about 16,000 personnel 450 aircraft total
- Part of: Armed Forces of Serbia and Montenegro
- Air Force HQ: Zemun, Belgrade, Serbia
- Patron: Saint Elijah
- Colors: Azure
- Engagements: Yugoslav Wars: Kosovo War; NATO bombing of Yugoslavia

Insignia
- Roundel

- Fin

Aircraft flown
- Attack: J-22, G-4, Mi-24, SA.342 GAMA
- Fighter: MiG-29, MiG-21Bis
- Interceptor: MiG-21Bis
- Reconnaissance: MiG-21M, MiG-21R, IJ-22, INJ-22, SA.341 HERA
- Trainer: Utva 75, G-4, NJ-22
- Transport: An-2, An-26, YAK-40, Mi-8

The Air Force of Serbia and Montenegro (Serbian: Ратно Ваздухопловство Србије и Црне Горе, РВСиЦГ, romanized: Ratno Vazduhoplovstvo Srbije i Crne Gore, lit. 'War Air Force of Serbia and Montenegro', RVSiCG), also known as the Air Force of Yugoslavia (JRV; Serbian: Југословенско Ратно Ваздухопловство, romanized: Jugoslovensko Ratno Vazduhoplovstvo, lit. 'Yugoslav War Air Force') from 1992 to 2003, was the air force of the former Serbia and Montenegro. It had around 300 fighter aircraft, ground attack aircraft, and other aircraft.

The air force, in 1990s, had about 16,000 personnel. The air force was disbanded when Montenegro voted to secede from the ex-FRY in 2006. The bulk of it was inherited by the Serbian Air Force and Air Defence.

== History ==
=== Creation and consolidation ===
The Air Force of the Federal Republic of Yugoslavia emerged following the dissolution of the Socialist Federal Republic of Yugoslavia in 1992. The new state inherited most of the former Yugoslav People's Army's military assets. A 1994 United Nations report estimated that Serbia and Montenegro possessed approximately 85% of the former JNA's combat aircraft and attack helicopters. The reorganized air force operated from bases including Batajnica, Kraljevo, Podgorica and Priština.

=== Operation Allied Force ===
Around 50 Yugoslav aircraft were lost during the Kosovo War when NATO aircraft attacked FRY forces in 1999. Six MiG-29s were destroyed in dogfights against F-15s, F-16s, and F-18s. Other MiG-29s were destroyed on the ground when NATO forces attacked the FRY's Batajnica Airfield.

==== Casualties ====
The commander-in-chief of the Air Force said that Air Force and Air Defense had 39 killed and 110 wounded personnel in combat. Air Force and Air Defense used innovative tactics to counter technologically more advanced and numerically superior opponents. AF & AD C-in-C Lieutenant General Spasoje Smiljanić was promoted to the rank of Colonel General and awarded Medal of War Flag - First Degree. Deputy of C-in-C Supreme Command Headquarters for the AF Colonel General Ljubiša Veličković was awarded the Medal of War Flag - First Degree. General Veličković was killed in combat

===== Air combat =====
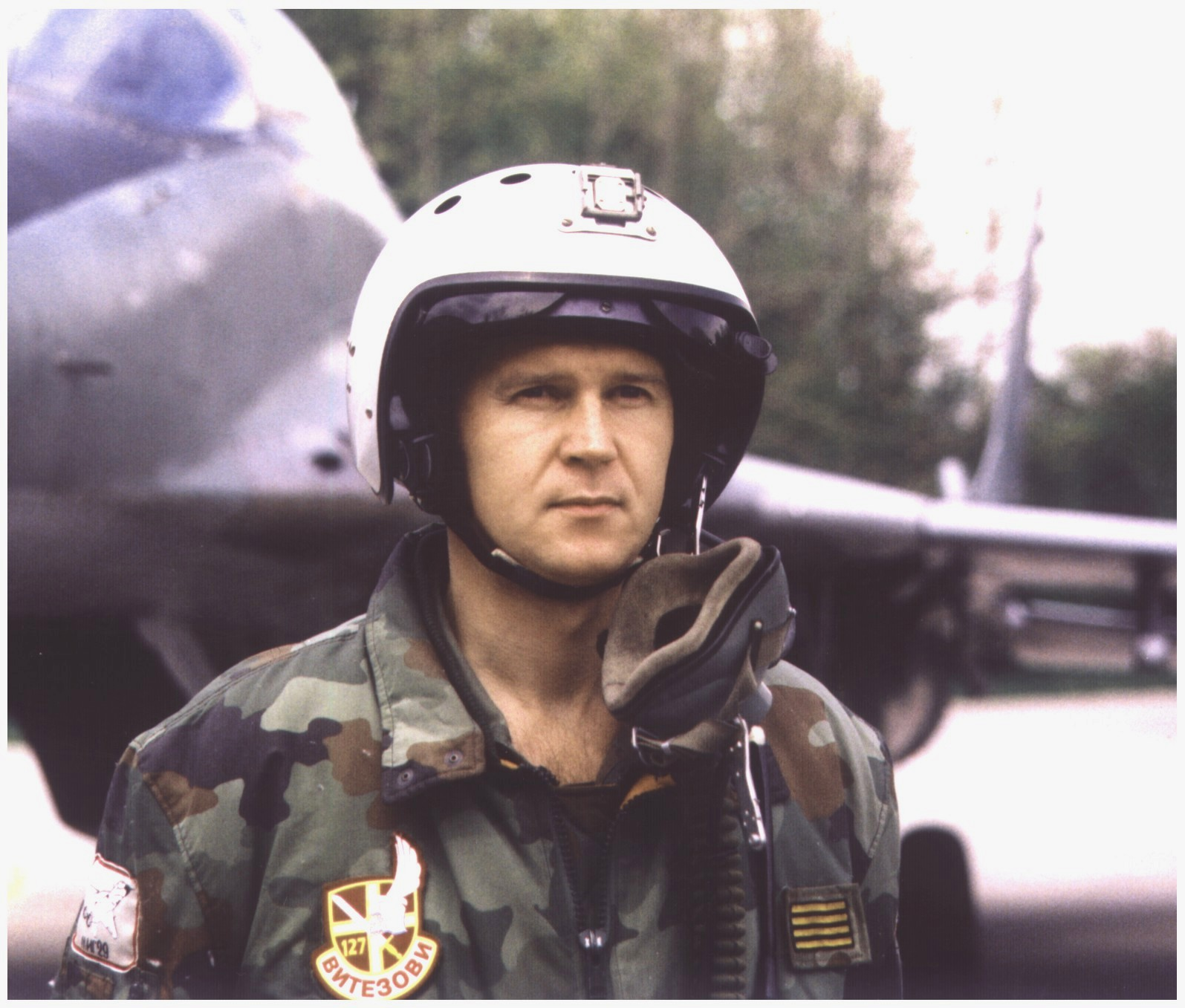
Captain Zoran Radosavljević in 1997.

The first Yugoslav planes in the air were the Knights of the 127th LAE (127th Fighter Squadron) with their MiG-29s (they were the only unit operating them). Based on publicly released data one could conclude that three MiGs were scrambled from Batajnica Air Base with Lieutenant Colonel Ljubiša Kulačin, Major Nebojša Nikolić and Major Milorad Milutinović in the cockpits and two (Lieutenant Colonel Dragan Ilić, Major Iljo Arizanov) from Niš Airport. Since Germany had the same type of MiG-29 for a decade, NATO was expected to be successful in jamming radar and communication with GC center. Bearing that in mind and the fact that great numbers of enemy aircraft were in the air backed by four AWACS planes, Yugoslav pilots applied new tactics. They abandoned the usual leader-wingman formations and used fast solo dashes near ground to stay out of sight and then, when close enough to fire their R-73s (AA-11 Archer air-to-air missiles), engage in a vertical climb trying to get a firing solution with their KOLS laser - IR rangefinder/homing system.

The following pilots were awarded Bravery Medals and promoted to higher ranks:

- Major Nebojsa Nikolić
- Major Slobodan Perić (killed in car accident 30 May 2010)
- Major Predrag Milutinović
- Major Iljo Arizanov
- Captain, 1st class, Zoran Radosavljević, killed in combat

Other pilots that flew combat missions (based on data gathered so far):

- Colonel General Ljubiša Veličković
- Colonel Milenko Pavlovic, commander of 204. Fighter Aviation Regiment, killed in combat
- Lieutenant Colonel Ljubiša Kulačin
- Lieutenant Colonel Dragan Ilić
- Major Abdul Emeti
- Major Bora Zoraja
- Major Dragan Milenković

==== List of awarded units ====
250. Rocket Brigade AD received the Order of the National Hero medal, the highest military medal for their exceptional service during the war.

126. VOJIN Brigade received the Order of the National Hero medal, the highest military medal for their exceptional service during the war.

==== List of awarded members ====
- Lieutenant Colonel Života Đurić, Bravery Medal and promotion to higher rank. He was killed when his J-22 Orao hit a hill.
- Colonel Bela Kis, Bravery Medal
- Colonel Goran Ostojić, Bravery Medal
- Lieutenant Colonel Sreto Malinović, Medal of Honor
- Major Srđan Vukičević, Bravery Medal
- Major Sava Milenković, Bravery Medal
- Major Rade Nikčević, Bravery Medal
- Major Aleksa Milovanović and Captain, 1st class Srđan Jovanović got Distinguished Service Medal's for rescuing downed pilot under enemy fire
- Captain, 1st class Emilijan Abrt, Bravery Medal
- Captain, 1st class Nebojša Mrvljević, Bravery Medal
- Captain Nenad Bulatović, Bravery Medal
- Captain Nenad Spasić, Bravery Medal
- Senior Sergeant, 1st class Dragan Vuković, Bravery Medal
- Sergeant, 1st class Miloš Akšić, Bravery Medal
- Sergeant, 1st class Zdravko Komazec, Bravery Medal
- Sergeant, 1st class Dragan Đuričić, Bravery Medal

==== List of destroyed aircraft ====
Aircraft	Serial	Place	Crew
MiG-29	18103	Batajnica	
MiG-29	18104	Niš	
MiG-29	18106	near Kruševac	Maj. Predrag "Grof" Milutinović, shot down by Dutch F-16AM J-063
MiG-29	18107	Batajnica	
MiG-29	18109	near Valjevo	Col. Milenko Pavlović†, shot down by NATO
MiG-29	18110	Ponikve	Maj. Slobodan Tešanović, noncombat flight
MiG-29	18111	near Titel	Maj. Nebojša Nikolić, shot down by NATO
MiG-29	18112	near Priština	Maj. Iljo Arizanov, shot down by possible friendly fire
MiG-29	18113	near Loznica	Capt. 1st Class Zoran Radoslavljević†, shot down by NATO
MiG-29	18114	near Bjeljina	Maj. Slobodan Perić, shot down by NATO
MiG-29UB	18302	Batajnica	
G-4 Super Galeb	23693 Leteće Zvezde	Golubovci	
G-4 Super Galeb	23694 Leteće Zvezde	Golubovci	
G-4 Super Galeb	23695 Leteće Zvezde	Golubovci	
G-4 Super Galeb	23696 Leteće Zvezde	Golubovci	
G-4 Super Galeb	23697 Leteće Zvezde	Golubovci	
G-4 Super Galeb	23698 Leteće Zvezde	Golubovci	
G-4 Super Galeb	23699 Leteće Zvezde	Golubovci	
G-4t Super Galeb	23604	Batajnica	
G-4t Super Galeb	23606	Batajnica	
J-22 Orao	25104	near Paraćin	Maj.Života Đurić†
J-22 Orao	25204	Ponikve	
J-22 Orao	25205	Ponikve	
NJ-22 Orao	25532	Ponikve	
NJ-22 Orao	25533	Ponikve	
J-22 Orao	25174	Ponikve	
J-22 Orao	25168	Ponikve	
IJ-22 Orao	25709	Moma center	
NJ-22 Orao	25527	Batajnica	
J-22 Orao	25164	Batajnica	
J-22 Orao	25152	Lađevci	
J-22 Orao	25207	Lađevci	
MiG-21 Bis	17135		
MiG-21 Bis	17220	Batajnica	
MiG-21 Bis	17228	Batajnica	
MiG-21 Bis	17231	Batajnica	
MiG-21 Bis	17401	Batajnica	
MiG-21 Bis-K	17208	Batajnica	
MiG-21 Bis	17162	Priština	
MiG-21 Bis	17169	Priština	
MiG-21 Bis	17170	Priština	
MiG-21 Bis	17224	Priština	
MiG-21 Bis	17166	Lađevci	
MiG-21 Bis	?	Batajnica	
MiG-21 Bis	?	Ponikve	
MiG-21 Bis	?	Sjenica	
MiG-21 M	?	Batajnica	
MiG-21 UM	16151	Batajnica	
An-2	70301	Leskovac	
An-2	70374	Leskovac	
An-2	70357	Leskovac	
Mi-14PL	11351	Golubovci	
Mi-14PL	11352	Golubovci	
Mi-14PL	11354	Golubovci	
Ka-25PL	11305	Golubovci	
Ka-25PL	11306	Golubovci	
G-2 Galeb	23211	Golubovci	
G-2 Galeb	23???	Golubovci	
G-2 Galeb	23???	Golubovci	
G-2 Galeb	23???	Golubovci	
G-2 Galeb	23???	Golubovci	
G-2 Galeb	23???	Golubovci	
G-2 Galeb	23???	Golubovci	
G-2 Galeb	23???	Golubovci	
G-2 Galeb	23???	Golubovci	
G-2 Galeb	23???	Golubovci	
G-2 Galeb	23???	Golubovci	
G-2 Galeb	23???	Golubovci	
G-2 Galeb	23???	Golubovci	
G-2 Galeb	23???	Golubovci	
G-2 Galeb	23???	Golubovci	
G-2 Galeb	23???	Golubovci	
G-2 Galeb	23???	Golubovci	
G-2 Galeb	23???	Golubovci	
Utva 75	53001	Pančevo, Utva	
Utva 75A	53263	Pančevo, Utva	
Utva 75AG	53265	Pančevo, Utva	
Utva 75R	53166	Pančevo, Utva	
Utva 75	53213	Sombor	
Lasta 95	54151	Pančevo, Utva	
Lasta 95	54153	Pančevo, Utva	
Lasta 95	54154	Pančevo, Utva	
Lasta 95	54155	Pančevo, Utva	
Lasta 95	54156	Pančevo, Utva	
Mi-8	12???	Kosovo	
Mi-8	12???	Kosovo	

== Organization ==
=== Structure ===
==== 1992–1994 ====
- Air Force and Air Defense Command
    - 333rd Engineering Battalion
    - 322nd Signal Battalion
    - 138th Transport Aviation Brigade
    - 280th Center for Electronic Reconnaissance and Jamming
    - Flight Test Center
  - Aviation Corps
    - 83rd Aviation Brigade
    - 172nd Aviation Brigade
    - 204th Aviation Brigade
    - 98th Fighter-Bomber Aviation Regiment
    - 97th Helicopter Regiment
    - 119th Helicopter Regiment
  - Air Defense Corps
    - 210th Signal Battalion
    - 126th Air Surveillance/Intelligence and Guidance Brigade
    - 250th Air Defense Missile Brigade
    - 450th Air Defense Missile Brigade
    - 60th Air Defense Self-Propelled Missile Regiment
    - 230th Air Defense Self-Propelled Missile Regiment
    - 240th Air Defense Self-Propelled Missile Regiment
    - 310th Air Defense Self-Propelled Missile Regiment
    - 311th Air Defense Self-Propelled Missile Regiment

==== 1994–1996 ====
- Air Force and Air Defense Command
    - 138th Transport Aviation Brigade
    - 280th Center for Electronic Reconnaissance and Jamming
    - Flight Test Center
  - Aviation Corps
    - 333rd Engineering Battalion
    - 172nd Aviation Brigade
    - 98th Aviation Brigade
    - 119th Helicopter Regiment
  - Air Defense Corps
    - 359th Engineering Battalion
    - 210th Signal Battalion
    - 83rd Fighter Aviation Regiment
    - 204th Fighter Aviation Regiment
    - 126th Air Surveillance/Intelligence and Guidance Brigade
    - 250th Air Defense Missile Brigade
    - 450th Air Defense Missile Regiment
    - 60th Air Defense Self-Propelled Missile Regiment
    - 230th Air Defense Self-Propelled Missile Regiment
    - 240th Air Defense Self-Propelled Missile Regiment
    - 310th Air Defense Self-Propelled Missile Regiment
    - 311th Air Defense Self-Propelled Missile Regiment

==== 1996–1999 ====
- Air Force and Air Defense Command
      - 353rd Reconnaissance Aviation Squadron "Sokolovi"
      - 677th Transport Aviation Squadron "Rode"
      - 890th Mixed Helicopter Squadron "Pegazi"
    - 280th Center for Electronic Reconnaissance and Jamming
    - Flight Test Center
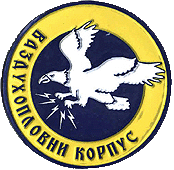
  - Aviation Corps
    - 333rd Engineering Battalion
    - 172nd Aviation Brigade
    - 98th Fighter-Bomber Aviation Regiment
    - 119th Helicopter Brigade
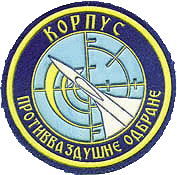
  - Air Defense Corps
    - 359th Engineering Battalion
    - 210th Signal Battalion
    - 83rd Fighter Aviation Regiment
    - 204th Fighter Aviation Regiment
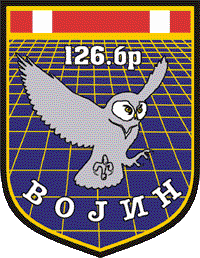
    - 126th Air Surveillance/Intelligence and Guidance Brigade
    - 250th Air Defense Missile Brigade
    - 450th Air Defense Missile Regiment
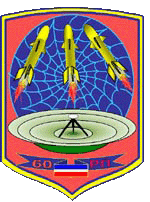
    - 60th Air Defense Self-Propelled Missile Regiment
    - 230th Air Defense Self-Propelled Missile Regiment
    - 240th Air Defense Self-Propelled Missile Regiment
    - 310th Air Defense Self-Propelled Missile Regiment
    - 311th Air Defense Self-Propelled Missile Regiment

==== 1999–2002 ====
- Air Force and Air Defense Command
      - 353rd Reconnaissance Aviation Squadron "Sokolovi"
      - 677th Transport Aviation Squadron "Rode"
      - 890th Mixed Helicopter Squadron "Pegazi"
    - 280th Center for Electronic Reconnaissance and Jamming
    - Flight Test Center
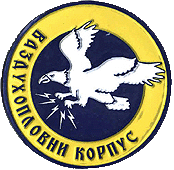
  - Aviation Corps
    - 333rd Engineering Battalion
    - 172nd Aviation Brigade
    - 98th Fighter-Bomber Aviation Regiment
    - 119th Helicopter Brigade
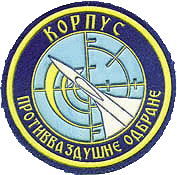
  - Air Defense Corps
    - 359th Engineering Battalion
    - 210th Signal Battalion
    - 204th Fighter Aviation Regiment
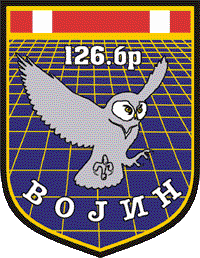
    - 126th Air Surveillance/Intelligence and Guidance Brigade
    - 250th Air Defense Missile Brigade
    - 450th Air Defense Missile Regiment
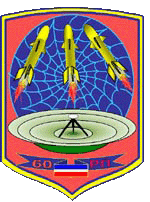
    - 60th Air Defense Self-Propelled Missile Regiment
    - 230th Air Defense Self-Propelled Missile Regiment
    - 240th Air Defense Self-Propelled Missile Regiment
    - 310th Air Defense Self-Propelled Missile Regiment

==== 2002–2006 ====
- Air Force and Air Defense Command
      - 353rd Reconnaissance Aviation Squadron "Sokolovi"
      - 677th Transport Aviation Squadron "Rode"
      - 890th Mixed Helicopter Squadron "Pegazi"
    - 280th Center for Electronic Reconnaissance and Jamming
    - Flight Test Center
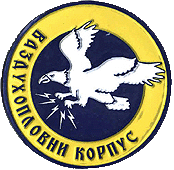
  - Aviation Corps
    - 333rd Engineering Battalion
    - 172nd Aviation Brigade
    - 98th Fighter-Bomber Aviation Regiment
    - 119th Helicopter Brigade
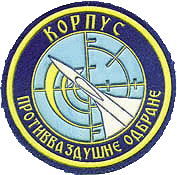
  - Air Defense Corps
    - 359th Engineering Battalion
    - 210th Signal Battalion
    - 204th Fighter Aviation Regiment
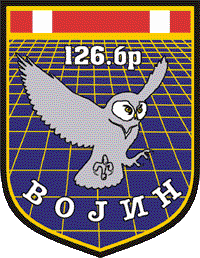
    - 126th Air Surveillance/Intelligence and Guidance Brigade
    - 250th Air Defense Missile Brigade
    - 230th Air Defense Self-Propelled Missile Regiment
    - 240th Air Defense Self-Propelled Missile Regiment
    - 310th Air Defense Self-Propelled Missile Regiment

=== Branches and services ===
Aviation	Air Defense Rocket-artillery Units	Early-warning Control and Reporting System	Air Force Technical Service

=== Ranks ===
==== Officers ====
The rank insignia of commissioned officers.

Rank group	General / flag officers				Senior officers			Junior officers
Air Force of Serbia and Montenegro
Air Force of Serbia and Montenegro	Генерал армије General armije	Генерал-пуковник; General-pukovnik	Генерал-потпуковник; General-potpukovnik	Генерал-мајор; General-major	Пуковник; Pukovnik	Потпуковник; Potpukovnik	Мајор; Major	Капетан прве класе Kapetan 1. klase	Капетан; Kapetan	Поручник; Poručnik	Потпоручник; Potporučnik

==== Other ranks ====
The rank insignia of non-commissioned officers and enlisted personnel.

Rank group	Senior NCOs						Junior NCOs		Enlisted
Air Force of Serbia and Montenegro
Air Force of Serbia and Montenegro	Заставник прве класе Zastavnik 1. klase	Заставник; Zastavnik	Старији водник прве класе Stariji vodnik 1. klase	Старији водник Stariji vodnik	Водник прве класе Vodnik 1. klase	Водник; Vodnik	Млађи водник Mlađi vodnik	Десетар; Desetar	Разводник; Razvodnik	Војник; Vojnik

== Inventory ==
=== Inventory 1998 ===
Aircraft	Origin	Type	Variant	In service	Notes
Combat Aircraft
MiG-21	Soviet Union	fighter	MiG-21bis MiG-21R	52	
MiG-29	Soviet Union	multirole	MiG-29A	14	
Soko G-4 Super Galeb	Yugoslavia	attack		47	
Soko J-22 Orao	Yugoslavia	attack		39	
Transport
Antonov An-2	Soviet Union	utility	An-2TD	4	
Antonov An-26	Soviet Union	transport		12	
Dornier Do 28	Germany	utility	Do 28D	2	
Yakovlev Yak-40	Soviet Union	VIP		4	
Helicopters
Aérospatiale Gazelle	France / Yugoslavia	utility	SOKO HO-42 SOKO HI-42 Hera SOKO HN-42M Gama SOKO HN-45M Gama 2	75	
Kamov Ka-25	Soviet Union	ASW	Ka-25PL	4	
Kamov Ka-27	Soviet Union	ASW	Ka-28PL	2	
Mil Mi-8	Soviet Union	utility	Mi-8T	44	
Mil Mi-14	Soviet Union	ASW	Mi-14PL	3	
Trainers
MiG-21	Soviet Union	conversion trainer	MiG-21UM	11	
MiG-29	Soviet Union	conversion trainer	MiG-29UB	2	
Soko G-2 Galeb	Yugoslavia	attack / trainer	G-2š	17	
Soko G-4 Super Galeb	Yugoslavia	attack / trainer	Soko G-4š	13	

=== Inventory 2003 ===
Aircraft	Origin	Type	Variant	In service	Notes
Combat Aircraft
MiG-21	Soviet Union	fighter	MiG-21bis MiG-21R	27	25 destroyed during the Kosovo War
MiG-29	Soviet Union	multirole	MiG-29A	4	10 destroyed during the Kosovo War
Soko G-4 Super Galeb	Yugoslavia	attack		23	24 destroyed during the Kosovo War
Soko J-22 Orao	Yugoslavia	attack		16	23 destroyed during the Kosovo War
Transport
Antonov An-2	Soviet Union	utility	An-2TD	1	3 destroyed during the Kosovo War
Antonov An-26	Soviet Union	transport		2	10 destroyed during the Kosovo War
Yakovlev Yak-40	Soviet Union	VIP		1	3 destroyed during the Kosovo War
Helicopters
Aérospatiale Gazelle	France / Yugoslavia	utility	SOKO HO-42 SOKO HI-42 Hera SOKO HN-42M Gama SOKO HN-45M Gama 2	62	13 destroyed during the Kosovo War
Kamov Ka-25	Soviet Union	ASW	Ka-25PL	1	3 destroyed during the Kosovo War
Mil Mi-8	Soviet Union	utility	Mi-8T	39	5 destroyed during the Kosovo War
Trainers
MiG-21	Soviet Union	conversion trainer	MiG-21UM	6	5 destroyed during the Kosovo War
MiG-29	Soviet Union	conversion trainer	MiG-29UB	1	1 destroyed during the Kosovo War
Soko G-2 Galeb	Yugoslavia	attack / trainer	Soko G-2š	1	16 destroyed during the Kosovo War
Soko G-4 Super Galeb	Yugoslavia	attack / trainer	Soko G-4š	8	5 destroyed during the Kosovo War

== Successors ==
The successors are the Serbian Air Force and the Montenegrin Air Force.
