= Gornje Crniljevo =

Gornje Crniljevo Горње Црниљево
- Village (selo)
- Location within Serbia
- Coordinates: 44°25′N 19°39′E
- Country: Serbia
- District: Kolubara
- Municipality: Osečina
- Time zone: UTC+1 (CET)
  - Summer (DST): UTC+2 (CEST)

Gornje Crniljevo is a village located in Osečina Municipality, Kolubara District, Serbia.

The toponym is derived from Slavic gornje ("upper") and crn ("black", cognate with Czech Černilov, etc.). The settlement was formerly known as Crniljevo-Osečina, while neighbouring Donje Crniljevo ("Lower Crniljevo") was known as Crniljevo Tamnavsko.

There are ceramic mines of miopliocene sediments in the area.

== Gallery ==
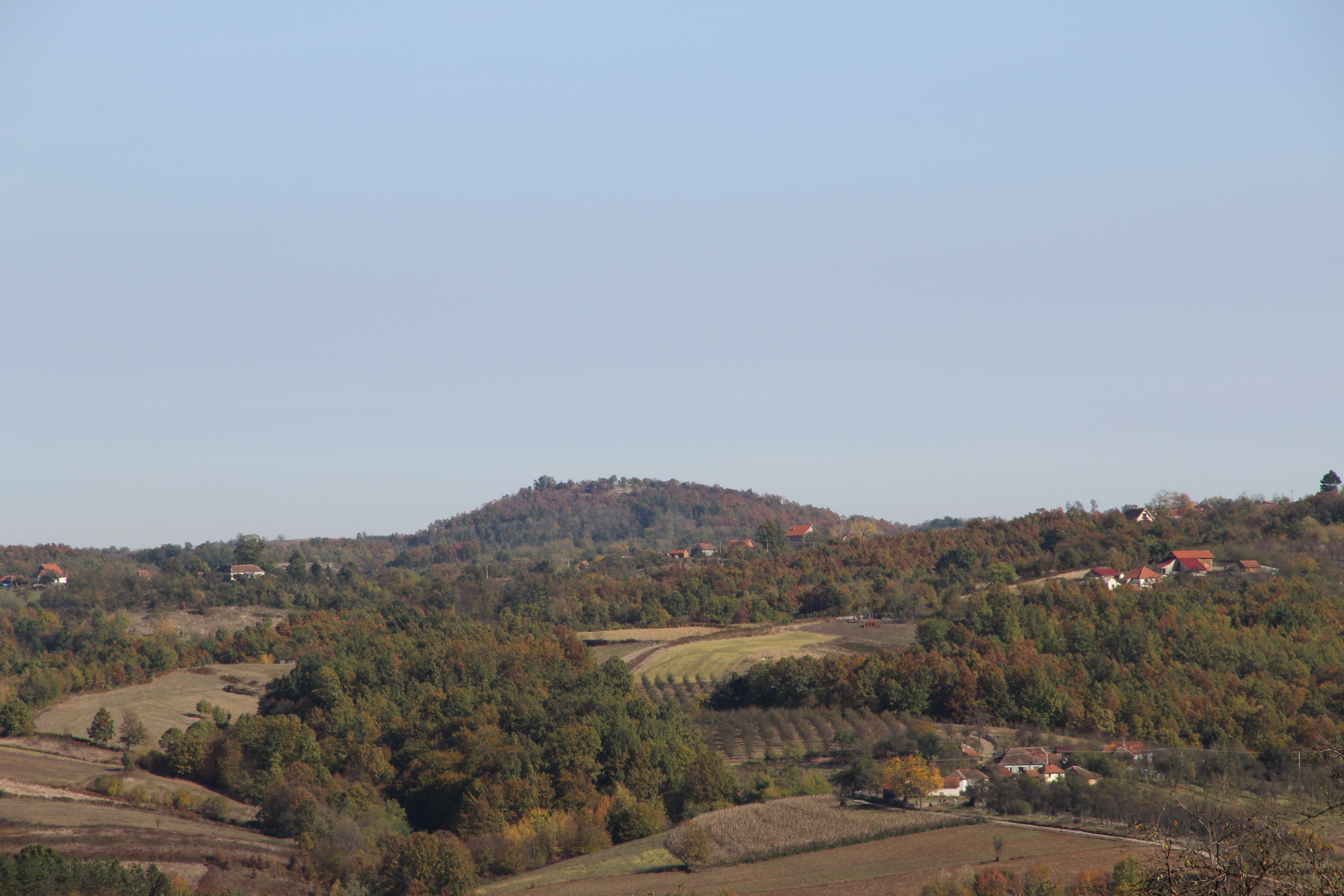
Gornje Crniljevo - panorama

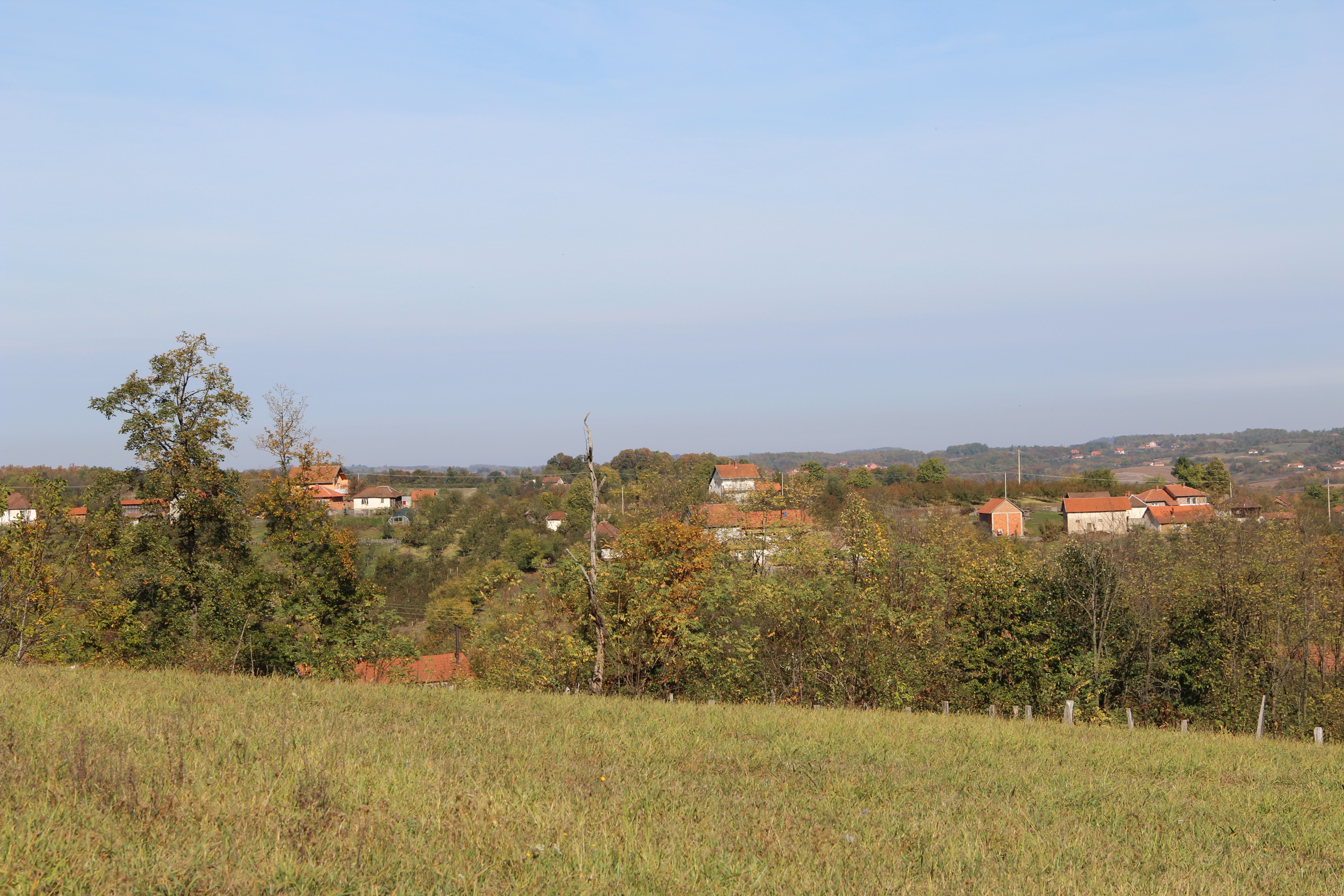
Gornje Crniljevo - panorama

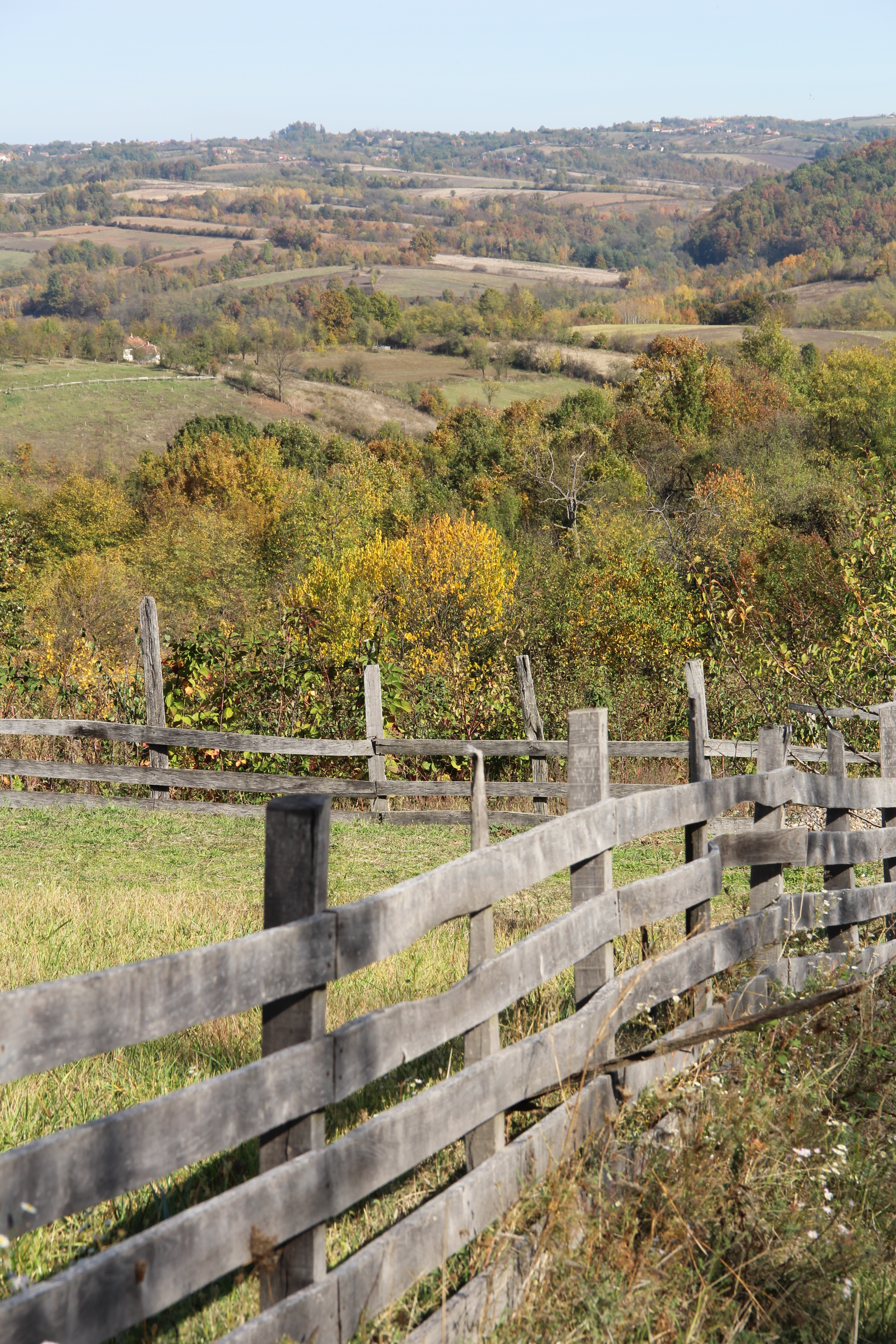
Gornje Crniljevo - panorama

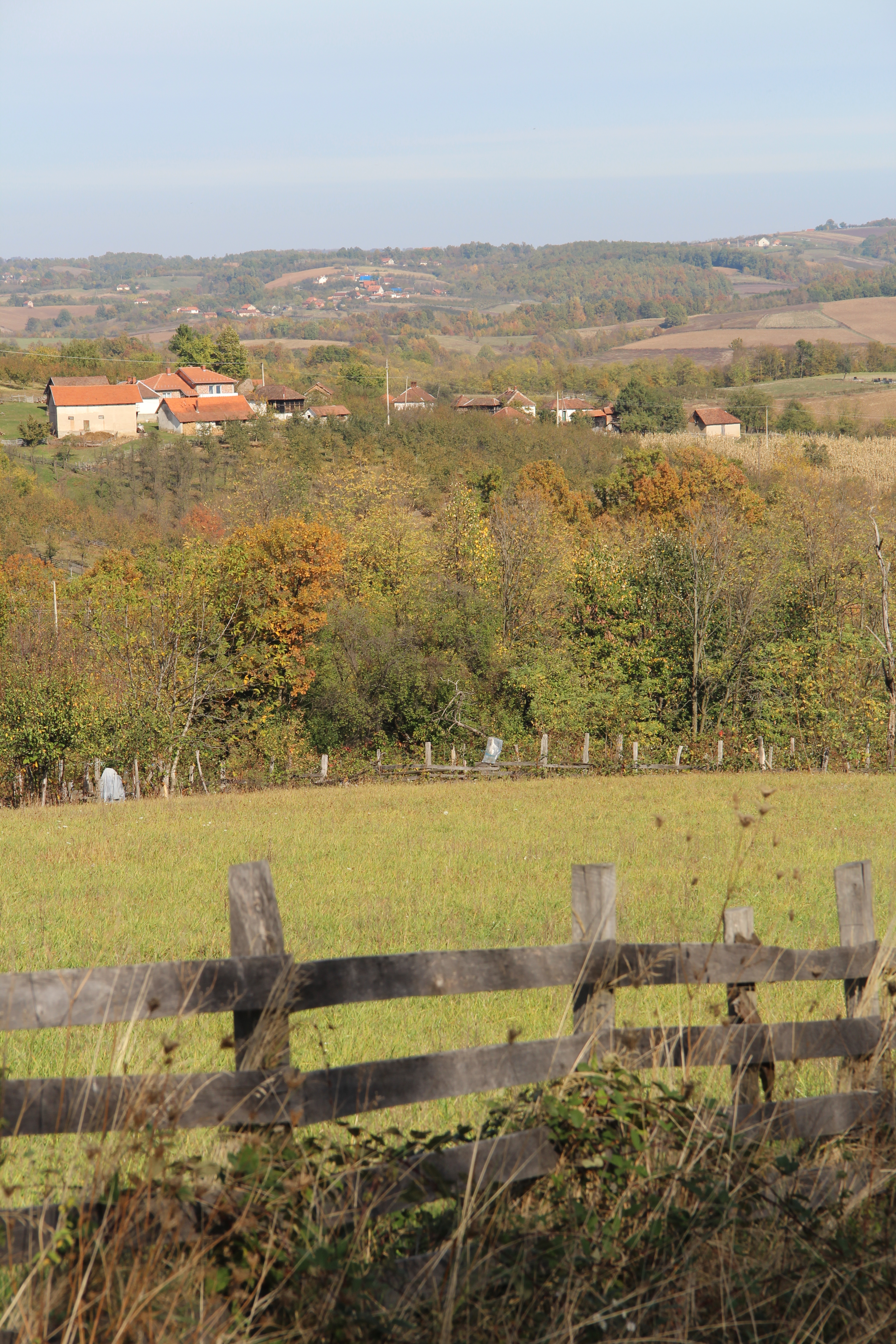
Gornje Crniljevo - panorama

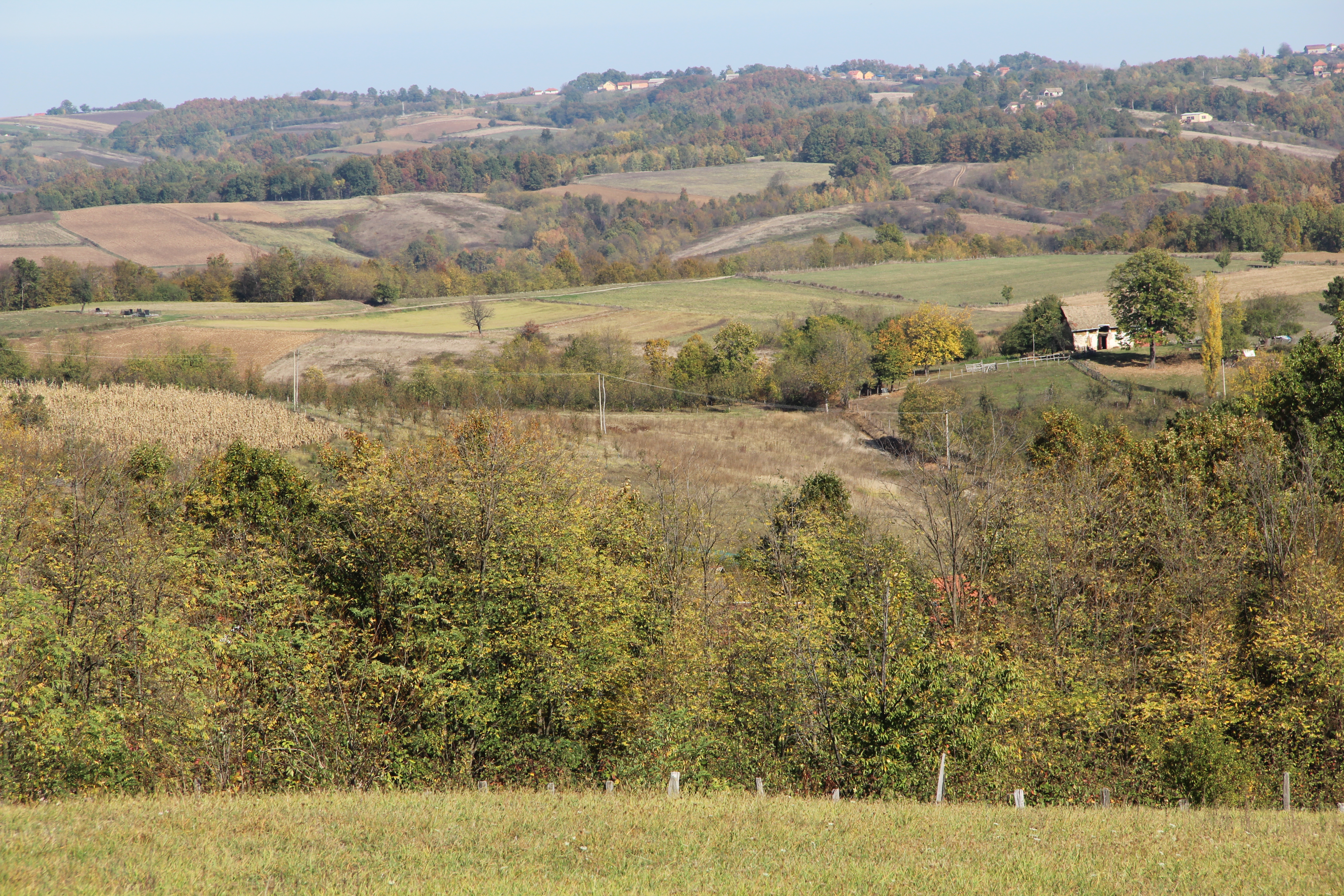
Gornje Crniljevo - panorama

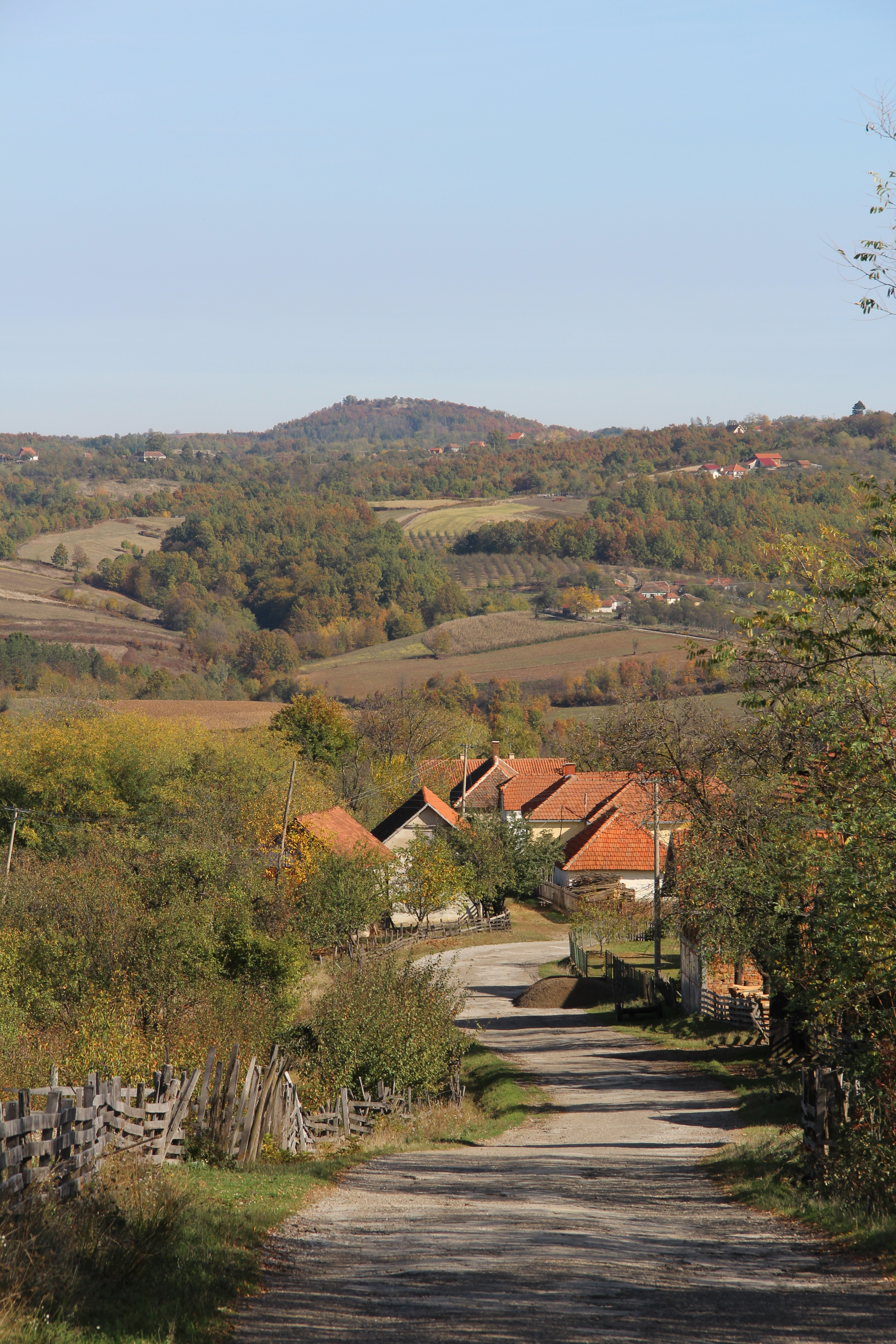
Gornje Crniljevo - panorama
