= Leteće zvezde =

Leteće zvezde - Flying Stars
- Active: 1985–2000
- Country: (Socialist Federal Republic of Yugoslavia) / (Federal Republic of Yugoslavia) Yugoslavia
- Branch: Yugoslav Air Force
- Role: Aerobatic display team
- Garrison/HQ: Zemunik Air Base; Golubovci Air Base
- Colors: Blue, White and Red

Insignia
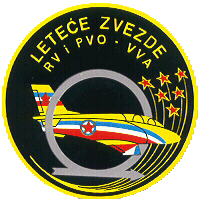
- 1985–1991 identification symbol

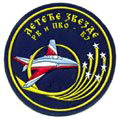
- 1996–2000 identification symbol

Aircraft flown
- Attack: 7 IJ-21 Jastrebs
- Trainer: 7 G-4 Super Galebs

The Leteće zvezde (Serbian Cyrillic: Летеће звезде, English: Flying Stars) was the official aerobatic flight display team of the Yugoslav Air Force.

== History ==
=== Predecessors ===
Yugoslavia has a long history of precision display flying, which was first demonstrated to the public during an airshow at Zemun – Belgrade's military airfield – in June 1938. After World War II, a pair of SFR Yugoslav Air Force Jungmeisters made regular appearances at air displays in the late 1940s.

These were followed by team of three Yakovlev Yak-3s, a five-plane grouping of the Ikarus S-49Cs (redesigned IK-3s) and in the late 1950s, the Air Force's first jet display team, flying F-84G Thunderjets. A new team formed by the 204th Fighter Aviation Regiment based at Batajnica (the unit's Canadair Mk 4 Sabers being responsible for the defense of Belgrade) flew over a crowd of 200.000 spectators attending the 1960 Belgrade Air show held at Zemun.

This team lasted for five years until a four–ship group using the indigenous G-2 Galeb basic jet trainer that performed for the first time at Ljubljana in July 1968, replaced it. The Galeb was replaced by single–seat light attack variant of the G–2, the J-21 Jastreb which was flown until 1979. In that year a pair of Czech Zlin Z-526 trainers, flown by Yugoslav Air Force instructors, took over and became the first postwar YAF demonstration team to an overseas invent, the Venice International air show in 1979

=== The Flying stars ===
By 1985 the team had reverted to flying six IJ-21 Jastreb, and the following year it was officially named the Flying stars, nicknamed Kanarinci (Canarys). Over the next five years, the distinctive red, white, blue and yellow Jastrebs of the Flying Stars became a familiar sight at air show throughout Yugoslavia.

They were replicated in 1990 by the G-4 Super Galeb advanced jet trainer and light attack aircraft which had made its debut in the West at the 1983 Paris air show.

However, almost exactly a year after their first public appearance, at the 1990 Batajnica airshow – and just before they were to make their international debut in Italy – the Flying Stars were grounded by the outbreak of hostilities in Slovenia at 1991.

During the years of isolation and sanctions, the team's Super Galebs were used for advanced training by the Air Force, although some the retained their red, white and blue color schemes. Once the decision to reform the Flying stars had been made on 9 October 1996, Major General Blagoje Grahovac, Commander of the Aviation Corps, gave the 172nd Air Brigade – controlling units at Podgorica – the responsibility of choosing new pilots and working out new routines.

Pilots were selected from a large number of volunteers, all of whom were experienced instructors and included two former members of the 1990 team, Major Predrag Vukašinović and Captain Saša Ristić. Under the leadership of Major Vukašinović and Captain Ristić each pilot was put through five test flights of the Super Galeb, two solo flights with the "boss" in the back seat, and another three outings, flying as a member of the full team.

By February 1997, the team manager and commentator (who is also the reserve pilot) and six pilots with varying backgrounds – one is a former MiG-21 pilot, while another flew the J-22 Orao – had been chosen and training begun in earnest. New routines were practiced using a basic formation of four, interspersed with a synchro pair. The display is flown at between 160-435 mph (260–700 km) with the main formation maintaining a separation of only 2 ft (60 cm)! A "flat" program for use in low cloud base condition was also designed and practiced. The final program, which lasts for 20 minutes, was demonstrated before senior officers in April 1997 after which approval for public appearance was given.

The new Flying Stars, with the three – bar roundel replacing the former Yugoslavia Air Force roundels with new ones, were seen in public for the first time at the Batajnica air show on 15 June 1997. Other domestic shows followed at Podgorica, Niš and Vršac, culminating in the first overseas appearance of a Yugoslav Air Force display team for nearly two decades. On 27-28 September 1997, the Flying Stars and their support aircraft, a YAF An-26 with the ground crews and ground handling equipment, appeared at the Bulgarian air show at Plovdiv Airport – Krumovo Air Base in front of more than 50,000 enthusiastic spectators. General Veličković, piloting his own Super Galeb accompanied them to Krumovo. The Flying Stars also appeared at the CIAF 1998 in Czech Republic.

All seven aircraft of the Flying Stars team were destroyed on Podgorica airfield during the NATO air campaign in Yugoslavia. General Veličković was killed on Batajnica airfield at the end of the war, he was only Yugoslav flag ranking officer who was killed during the war.

After the war Flying Stars have appeared Air Force day—August 2, 2000, at Golubovci air base, flying on regular G-4 Super Galeb aircraft painted in standard green-gray-blue color schemes. Soon after that, the bad situation in military and air force both, lack of fuel, aircraft and money have influenced the disband of Flying Stars. Its pilots continued aerobatic flying as test pilot of Flight Test Center—VOC (now Flight Test Section of Technical Testing Center) performing their program on solo flight at Super Galeb aircraft at various airshows in Czech Republic, Hungary, Greece, Slovakia and Romania.

== Aircraft ==
Soko J-21 Jastreb
1985–1990
The Flying Stars had for a short time, used seven Jastreb light attack-reconnaissance aircraft. They were painted yellow with the colours of the Yugoslav Flag in blue, white and red. After being replaced by G-4 they were returned to service in the Yugoslav Air Force combat units.

J-21 Jastreb serial numbers:

- 24404
- 24409
- 24412
- 24417
- 24418
- 24422
- 24423

Soko G-4 Super Galeb
1990-1999
The seven G-4 Super Galeb trainer–light attack aircraft replaced the J-21 Jastrebs. They were painted in colours of Yugoslav Flag, blue, white and red. In 1999 during NATO's attack on Yugoslavia, all aircraft of the Flying stars team were destroyed at the Golubovci Air Base despite at the time being non-combatant aircraft. After the war, team have appeared flying on standard Super Galeb aircraft of Air Force, painted in regular camouflage schemes until it was formally disbanded in 2000.

G-4 Super Galeb serial numbers:

- 23693
- 23694
- 23695
- 23696
- 23697
- 23698
- 23699

== Gallery ==
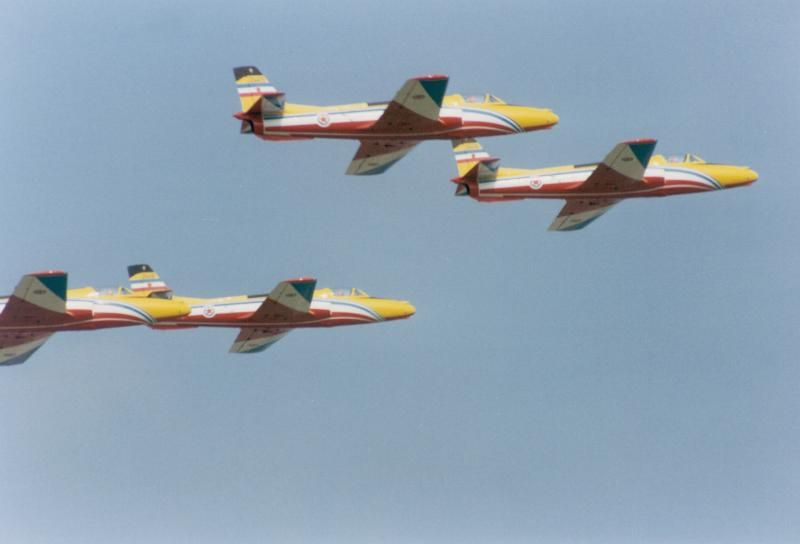
Four J-21 Jastreb aircraft of Leteće zvezde in flight.

== See also ==
- J-21 Jastreb
- G-4 Super Galeb
- Yugoslav Air Force
- Air Force of Serbia and Montenegro
