= Zoltán Dani =

Serbian military officer

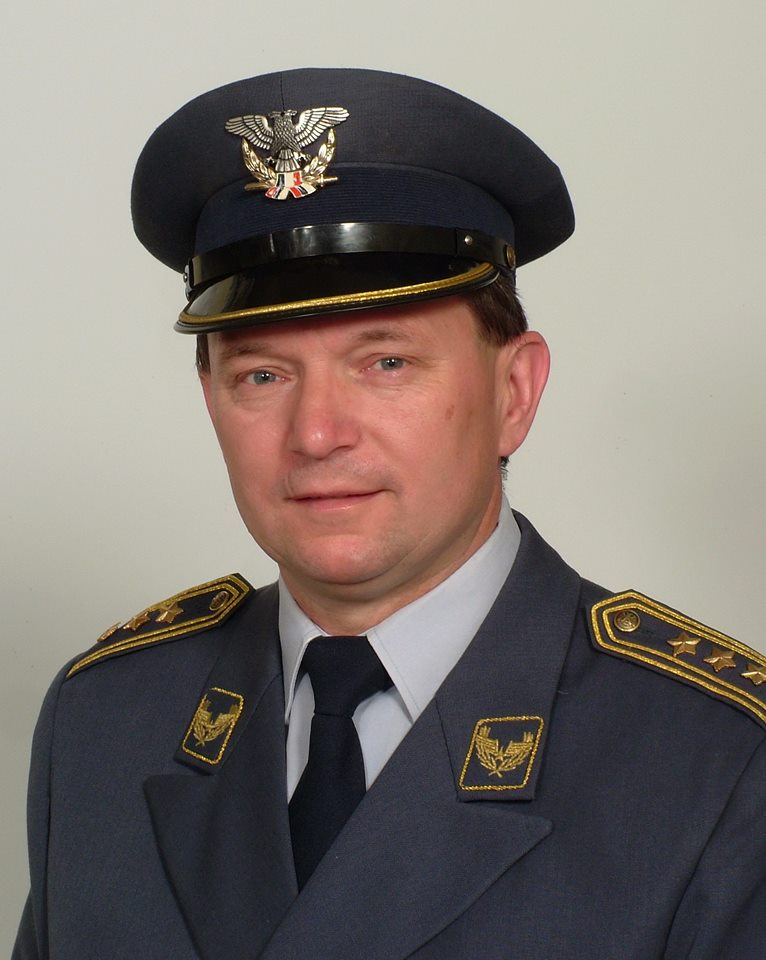
- Born: 23 July 1956 (age 70); Kovin, Vojvodina, PR Serbia, Yugoslavia
- Military career
- Allegiance: SFR Yugoslavia (1978–1992); FR Yugoslavia (1992–2003); Serbia and Montenegro (2003–2004)
- Service years: 1978–2004
- Rank: Colonel
- Unit: 250th Air Defense Missile Brigade
- Commands: 3rd battery of the 250th Missile Brigade
- Conflicts: Kosovo War; NATO bombing of Yugoslavia; 1999 F-117A shootdown

Zoltán Dani (Hungarian: Dani Zoltán; Serbian Cyrillic: Золтан Дани; 23 July 1956) is a Serbian-Hungarian retired officer of the Yugoslav Army.

Dani was the commander of the 3rd battery of the 250th Missile Brigade, which shot down a NATO F-117 Nighthawk near the village of Buđanovci on 27 March 1999, during the Kosovo War. The hit was achieved with a S-125 surface-to-air missile system. He was initially unknown to the public and aliased with the name Gvozden Đukić (Гвозден Ђукић). However, upon retiring from the military, he revealed his identity.

Dani claimed that his battery also shot down a NATO F-16. Although NATO initially claimed the loss was due to "mechanical failure"; the F-16's pilot recounted that his aircraft was hit by a SAM.

Since retiring from military service, Dani has opened a bakery and a family restaurant in his native village of Skorenovac.

== Preparations for the Kosovo War ==
Based on experiences learned from the 1982 Lebanon War, constant relocation of all assets was key to survival of Dani's unit, the 3rd missile detachment of the 250th Yugoslav Air Defense Battalion. Although the SA-3 / "S-125M Neva" system is not a mobile SAM complex per design, its solid fueled missiles are transportable in near combat ready condition (in fact the Polish Armed Forces and Cuban Revolutionary Armed Forces each created mobile versions of the SA-3 on T-72 and T-55 tank chassis respectively in the 1990s).

Therefore, Dani trained his SA-3 unit to achieve a 90-minute equipment break-down time with minimal lighting provided for better camouflage, one hour better than the standard time. Further set-up and break-down time reductions were achieved by reducing the SA-3 unit's number of active 5P73 launchers and V-601M missiles to just 2 × 2 from the original 4x4 configuration.

This reduction in missile capability was justified, because of the expected strictly limited time slots and occasions where a Yugoslav SAM battery could open fire in face of a tremendous NATO Wild Weasel capability, with any hope of self-preservation. The lean use of SAMs also became a necessity later on, as the initial 24 March 1999, 20:20 NATO air strike destroyed eighty reloads of ready to use V-601M missiles stored in two concrete vaults at the Jakovo SAM base.

Dani made it a strict field rule that the SA-3's UNV type fire control radar could only be turned on for a maximum of 2 × 20 seconds in combat, after which the battery's equipment must be immediately broken down and trucked to a prepared alternative launch site, whether or not any missile has been fired. This rule proved essential, because other Yugoslav AAA units, emitting high-frequency radiation for any longer periods or forgetting to relocate, were hit by AGM-88 HARM missile counter-strikes from NATO aircraft, suffering radar equipment and personnel losses.

In order to train personnel to operate efficiently under such pressures, Dani obtained access to an "Accord" electronic signal simulator, which allowed the SA-3 radar and guidance crew practice combat scenarios based on imitated engagements. Several soldiers were removed from position both during the pre-war practice drills and wartime guard shifts, when they proved unable to cope with the psychological stress of being targeted by enemy aircraft.

It was decided two missiles would be launched against any target near simultaneously, in order to maximize hit probability. Unusually, launches were to be conducted against NATO aircraft that had already accomplished their ground strike missions and were about to leave Yugoslav airspace. Their northern heading was pointing away from the direction of powerful NATO airborne jammer sources, thereby allowing the SA-3's un-modernized UNV fire control radar set to operate with less interference.

Dani's mobility rule was strictly observed in his unit, with the trucks relocating frequently during the 78 days of the Kosovo War, as they constantly shuttled missiles, radars and equipment among the dozen alternative launch sites, most of them embankments left over from already phased out SA-2 (S-75) units.

Radar sets obtained from confiscated Iraqi MiG-21 planes were planted around the SAM sites to serve as active emitter decoys, which diverted some anti-radiation missiles from the actual targets (dozens of Iraqi MiG-21/23 warplanes, sent to Yugoslavia for industrial overhaul, were seized in 1991, after Saddam Hussein's invasion of Kuwait). Retired SAM radar sets were used as optical decoys, left at well-known military bases to lure NATO warplanes to waste munition on worthless targets. Owing to these measures, Dani's unit evaded 23 incoming HARM missiles, all of which impacted off-site with insignificant or zero damages.

General surveillance of NATO aircraft was provided by vintage P-18 radar sets, which used vacuum tubes and a large rotating Yagi antenna grid for meter-band illumination. Under optimal conditions the Soviet-made P-18 was able to plot large-radar cross-section aircraft from 125 to 200 km (78 to 124 mi), depending on the target's size, but with a high range inaccuracy of several hundred meters.

Dani tuned his P-18 to the lowest possible frequency, hoping that meter band waves would reflect from the inside of targets, rendering stealth aircraft skin technology ineffective. In practice his modified P-18 provided stable plot of F-117 movements from just 25 km (16 mi), which was useful when combined with the comparatively short missile range of the SA-3 air defense complex. Furthermore, the P-18 meter band radar could be kept almost constantly emitting, since most NATO radar warning receiver devices did not cover such a very low frequency band.

Dani initially claimed that four major capacitors had been replaced in the P-18, to further increase the wavelength. However, he later admitted that no such modifications had been made, and that his story was a "marketing trick."

== The stealth kill ==
On the particular night of the F-117 shootdown, 27 March 1999, Dani broke his own ruleset. He had information about unfavorable Adriatic weather conditions and Yugoslav spies residing near Italian NATO airbases informed the Yugoslav Air Defense HQ about lack of EA-6 Prowler electronic jammer and "Wild Weasel" anti-SAM aircraft launches during the late evening. Therefore, any F-117s in the air on that night were alone in the dark, but with high crew morale due to their invulnerability during previous days' sorties.

In the evening, Dani's P-18 long-distance radar set malfunctioned at 19:05, almost the same time when four F-117s prepared for take-off from Aviano Air Base to attack targets in Belgrade. The repaired P-18 radar returned to air by 19:50 and started to emit lower frequency. Lt. Col. Dale Zelko's plane (tail number 82-0806) and three other F-117 flying northbound were acquired at 20:40 local time and so the SA-3 battery's fire control radar went on air. The UNV radar emitted at high frequency for 2 × 20 seconds, but it was unable to obtain a lock on the targets.

Dani then ordered a third illumination round, against his own rules, but knowing that NATO lacked immediate counterstrike capability on the particular occasion. Lock was obtained at a distance of 13 km (8.1 mi) and an altitude of 8 km (5.0 mi). Two SA-3 missiles were launched in short succession, with one obtaining a proximity fuse hit, as notified by an automatic radio pinger burst. The F-117 was structurally disabled by the sudden minus 6G negative load and stall-crashed in inverted position in an agricultural field, near the village of Buđanovci. The pilot ejected successfully and was rescued later on by NATO Combat search and rescue helicopters. The F-117's large kite-shaped titanium engine outlet heatshield is still kept by Dani in his garage.

== Further combat activity ==
Dani also claims that his unit downed the commander's F-16 plane from the Aviano-based 555th Fighter Squadron "Triple Nickel". On 1/2 May 1999 the F-16 (s/n 88-0550) had already completed its combat sortie and was flying outbound from Yugoslav airspace, when its on-board radar warning receiver indicated illumination from Dani's SA-3 fire control radar. The pilot, Lt. Col. David L. Goldfein, decided to turn back and attack, but this proved a mistake, as two missiles were already underway and one hit his plane. Dani was not actually in the combat shift (for a unit to provide 24h/day readiness the crew is divided in 3 shifts) when the shootdown occurred. The shift was commanded by Maj. Boško Dotlić.

The radio signal logs of unit 250/3 contain two further proximity fuse activation pings beyond the F-117 and F-16 shootdown events, indicating that either extra NATO aircraft were hit or ALE-50 towed jammer devices were destroyed by the missiles, as opposed to the SAMs simply missing due to radar jamming or chaff dispersal. The one recorded on 30 April 1999. by the combat shift commanded by Major Boško Dotlić corresponds to a hit on a second F-117 which managed to return to its base in Spangdahlem, Germany, only to be written off. The other ping was recorded on 19 May 1999. by the combat shift commanded by Lt. Col. Đorđe Aničić (Dani's second in command). In his published wartime diary Aničić stated that the target had a large radar reflection and that the battery received unconfirmed reports that they hit a USAF B-2 strategic bomber which supposedly had crashed in Croatia near the border with the Federal Republic of Yugoslavia, although Dani was of the opinion that they hit a towed decoy instead.

== Personal life ==
Zoltán Dani is part of the Hungarian minority in Serbia. Zoltán Dani is of Bukovina Székely origin. Dani is of Hungarian ancestry; his paternal family were Hungarians from Székelys of Bukovina, who, like the majority of inhabitants of the village, settled in Vojvodina in the late 19th century, while his mother was also of Hungarian ancestry. Dani is the father of three adult children, he lives with his wife in Skorenovac. On 27 March 1999, he became the first person in the world to shoot down a stealth aircraft with an air defense missile. He was celebrated as a hero in Yugoslavia. They managed to shoot down the "invisible" stealth F-117 Nighthawk aircraft by modifying the frequency of the surveillance radar. Dani emphasized that, since this was against regulations, he could have received a medal for his actions just as easily as he could have gone to prison. In the end, however, neither happened. Dani also emphasized that he did not shoot it down alone, the operation was a team effort. He always placed great emphasis on teamwork within his unit, which is why they did not lose any men. Dani said that neither he nor his unit knew that their target was "invisible", they only found out the next day that they had shot down one of the famous stealth aircraft. During the Kosovo War, NATO officially lost two aircraft: the stealth F-117 bomber and an F-16 fighter, both shot down by the unit of Dani. He was promoted to be colonel after the shot the stealth bomber, but as a Hungarian in the Serbian army, that was the highest rank he could attain. Dani finished his service in 2004. Retiring with the rank of colonel, Zoltán Dani continued his career as a baker in Skorenovac (Székelykeve in Hungarian) in the southernmost Hungarian-majority town near Belgrade. He opened a bakery with his family and also began working in the tourism sector.

Zoltán Dani regularly gives presentations in Hungary about the famous shootdown.

Dale Zelko, the pilot of the American aircraft shot down by the missile ejected safely. Years later, they began corresponding, eventually met in person, and formed a friendship. A film was later made about their story.

== In media ==
A documentary movie The 21st Second was made about Zoltán Dani. Dani also participated in the documentary movie The Second Meeting, where he met Dale Zelko, the F-117 pilot he had shot down.

== Politics ==
Dani was a Socialist Party of Serbia candidate in the 2022 general election, positioned 26th on the SPS ballot list. He assumed his position as a Member of the National Assembly on 1 August 2022, but is not an active Member of Parliament anymore.

== Sources ==
- 7 slika Zoltan Dani. Novosadska televizija. 25 September 2013. Archived from the original on 22 December 2021 – via YouTube.
- Dsouza, Larkins (8 February 2007). "This is how the F-117A was shot down in Serbia by a SA-3 (S-75) Goa SAM in 1999". Defence Aviation. Archived from the original on 27 August 2017.
- Predavanje Zoltana Danija o obaranju aviona F-117A [Shooting down the F117, Zoltan Dani Lecture]. TangoSix. 26 April 2017. Archived from the original on 22 December 2021 – via YouTube.
- Safe distance. kuda.org. Archived from the original on 22 December 2021 – via YouTube.: found footage from the cockpit of the F117
- "Serb discusses 1999 downing of stealth". USA Today. Associated Press. 26 October 2005.
