= 250th Air Defence Missile Brigade =

- 250. ракетна бригада за противваздухопловна дејства
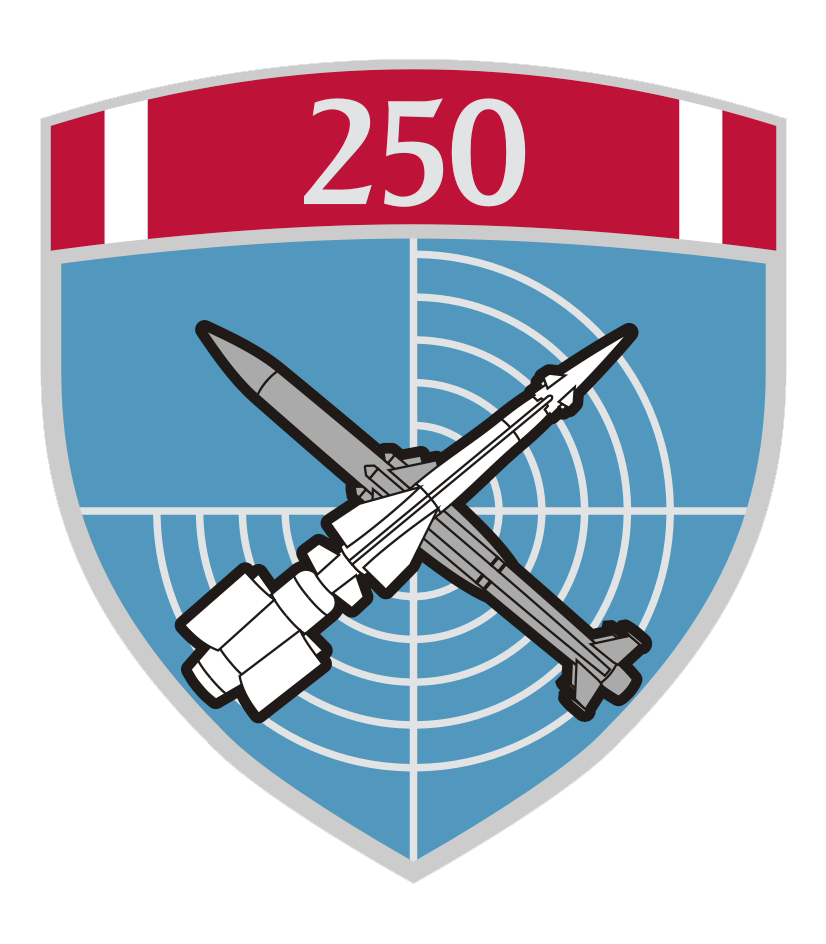
- Current insignia
- Active: 1962 – present
- Country: Serbia
- Branch: Serbian Air Force and Air Defence
- Type: Air brigade
- Role: Air defence
- Garrison/HQ: Belgrade
- Anniversaries: 24 November
- Engagements: Kosovo War: 1999 NATO bombing of Yugoslavia

Commanders
- Current commander: Brigadier General Momčilo Milinkov

The 250th Air Defence Missile Brigade (Serbian: 250. ракетна бригада за протвваздухопловна дејства, romanized: 250. raketna brigada za protivvazduhoplovna dejstva) is a joint tactical unit of Serbian Air Force and Air Defence.

== History ==
=== Yugoslavia ===
The origins of the 250th Air Defense Missile Brigade dates back to 25 November 1962, when 250th Air Defense Missile Regiment of Yugoslav Air Force was established in Belgrade with the task of defending the capital. Between 1962 and 1980, the 250th Air Defense Missile Regiment was armed with S-75 Dvina high-level air defense system and its structure was composed of four rocket and one rocket-technical battalions. In 1966 1st and 2nd Missile battalions, rocket-technical battalions and part of regiments command were sent to the Soviet Union for missile shooting with Soviet Air Defence Forces units at "Ashuluk" shooting ground near Astrakhan. This was the first time that a Yugoslav People's Army unit went abroad for its task execution, so the preparation for shooting is dedicated to the special attention.

The 250th Air Defense Missile Regiment changed its name to 250th Air Defense Missile Brigade in 1980 as a result of its expansion with four rocket and one rocket-technical battalions of the S-125 "Neva" medium-range air defense system. The next reorganization of the 250th Air Defense Missile Brigade took place in 1992 when it incorporated that unit acquired the 350th Air Defense Missile Regiment (armed with S-125M Neva-M) which has been relocated from Slovenia following that country's independence from the rest of Yugoslavia. When Yugoslav People's Army was officially dissolved in May 1992, the unit joined the newly formed Armed Forces of Serbia and Montenegro as part of Air Defense Corps of Air Force of Serbia and Montenegro. In period from 1994 to 1996 missile battalion armed with S-75 Dvina air defense system were disband.

=== 1999 Nato bombing ===
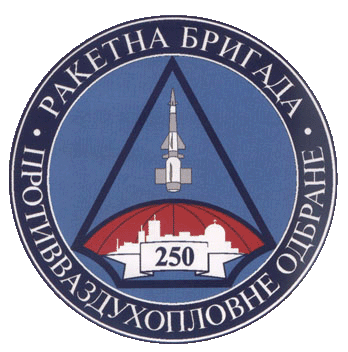
Emblem of the 250th Air Defense Missile Brigade of Air Force of Serbia and Montenegro

When FR Yugoslavia (Serbia and Montenegro) came under NATO attack (Operation Allied Force) in 1999, the 250th Air Defense Missile Brigade was armed only with the Neva-M medium-range air defense system. Its units performed 111 maneuvers, held 88 fire positions, relocated its equipment to more than 100 locations and was attacked from the air with bomb and missile strikes more than 100 times.

On March 27, the 3rd Battery under command of Colonel Zoltán Dani shot down a stealth F-117 Nighthawk using a modification of the Neva-M system. The F-117 Nighthawk, flown by USAF Lt. Colonel Dale Zelko and with the markings AF 82 806 HO, crashed in the vicinity of the village of Buđanovci, near Ruma. It was believed to be the first confirmed shootdown of a stealth technology aircraft.

On May 2, a USAF F-16CJ Fighting Falcon, flown by USAF Lt. Colonel David L. Goldfein, commander of the 555th Fighter Squadron (who served as the Chief of Staff of the Air Force from 2016 to 2020) was shot down by the 250th Air Defence Missile Brigade close to the village of Nakučani, near Šabac. This shootdown was also the work of the 3rd Battery, though due to the shift schedule, Dani was not present. Major Boško Dotlić oversaw the shootdown.

=== Reorganization and modernization ===
In 2004 the 450th Air Defense Missile Regiment, armed with Neva-M missile system, ceased to exist after it was previously transferred from the town of Kraljevo (where it was deployed for 12 years after being relocated from North Macedonia in 1992) to the Belgrade area where it was integrated into the structure of the 250th Air Defense Missile Brigade.

One battery (six units) of the Pantsir S1 was delivered in 2020, while 2 batteries of Pantsir-S1M are on order.

In 2020, the purchase of the HQ-22 was announced, first time that any Chinese medium and long range surface-to-air missile system had been exported to a European country. In 2022 four batteries of FK-3 has been delivered and was assigned to the 250th Air Defence Missile Brigade i.e. its newly-formed 2nd Air Defence Missile Battalion.

== Missions ==
Brigade performs the following tasks:

- Air defense
- Responding to incidents in national airspace
- Participation in international military exercises
- Support actions and countering possible terrorist acts from the air

== Structure ==
The 250th Air Defence Missile Brigade consists of three rocket missile air defense battalions, three self-propelled rocket missile air defense battalions and a command battery. The command of the brigade is based at Banjica in Belgrade. The HQ-22 batteries of the 2nd Battalion are deployed mainly to protect wider area around the capital, Belgrade, but also wider areas around the strategically important air bases of Niš Air Base and Lađevci Air Base, with battery of Pantsir-S1 serves as close-range protection of HQ-22 batteries. Two "Neva" battalions are deployed around Belgrade, the 1st battalion at Jakovo and 3rd battalion one at Zuce, while three "Kub-M" battalions are deployed near the cities of Niš, Novi Sad and Kragujevac.

- Command Battery
- 1st Air Defence Missile Battalion (equipped with S-125 Neva)
- 2nd Air Defence Missile Battalion (equipped with HQ-22)
- 3rd Air Defence Missile Battalion (equipped with Pantsir S1 and S-125 Neva)
- 4th Air Defence Missile Battalion (equipped with HQ-17)
- 230th Air Defence Self-Propelled Missile Battalion (equipped with 2K12 Kub)
- 240th Air Defence Self-Propelled Missile Battalion (equipped with 2K12 Kub)
- 310th Air Defence Self-Propelled Missile Battalion (equipped with 2K12 Kub)

== Equipment ==
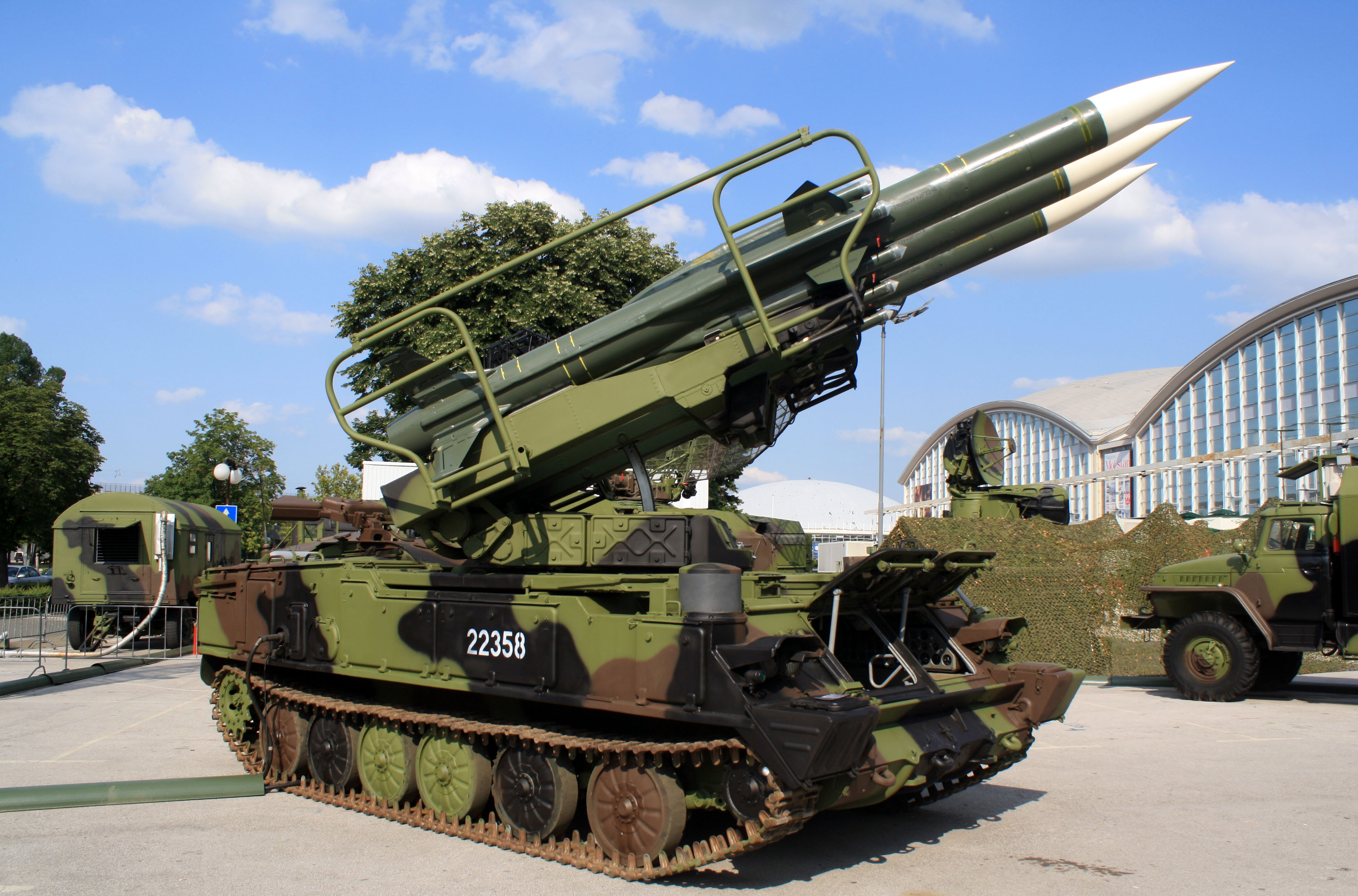
2K12 Kub M

The main equipment of a brigade consists of various land-based SAM systems. Four batteries of the Chinese-made HQ-22 medium-range system and two batteries of the HQ-17 short-range system, along with one battery of the Russian-made Pantsir S1 short-range system, form the backbone of the brigade and the entire air defence component of the Serbian Armed Forces. Other systems include older Soviet-made surface-to-air missile systems S-125M1T "Neva" and 2K12 "Kub M", both modernized during the 2010s. The "Neva" systems have been modernized to S-125M1T standard with an upgraded digital radar P-12 which enables operation from a location 500m away from the radar cabin.

Supporting equipment include surveillance and surveillance-acquisition radars with semi-active radar homing composite guidance or radio-command guidance for HQ-22, P-12 and P-18 for "Neva", reconnaissance-radar station P-40 with 1RL-128D-1 reconnaissance-aviation radar and PRV-16B altitude measurement radar for "Kub".

== Traditions ==
=== Anniversary ===
The anniversary of the unit is celebrated on November 24, in memory of the day when the 250th Air Defense Missile Regiment was formed in 1962.

=== Patron saint ===
The unit's slava or its saint's feast day is saint Stefan Dečanski known as Mratindan.

=== Decorations ===
Order of the National Hero (2000)
