= Paul Horn =

Paul Horn may refer to:

- Paul Horn (musician) (1930–2014), American jazz flutist
- Paul Horn (computer scientist) (born 1946), American computer scientist
