= Dale Zelko =

American military officer (born 1963)

Darrell Patrick "Dale" Zelko
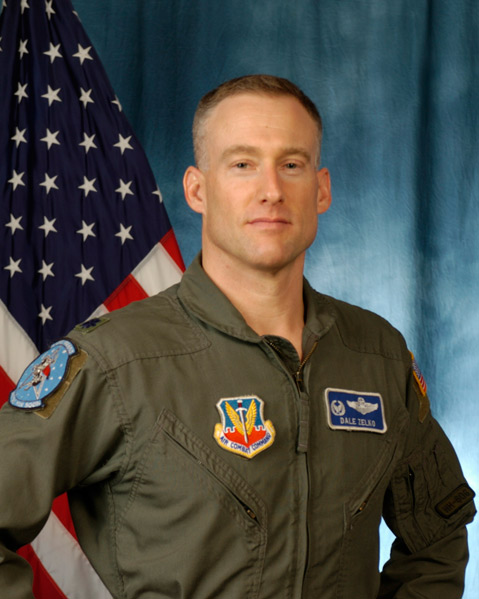
- Born: November 30, 1963 (age 62); United States
- Spouse: Lauren Zelko
- Military career
- Allegiance: United States
- Branch: United States Air Force
- Rank: Lieutenant Colonel
- Unit: 49th Fighter Wing
- Conflicts: Gulf War; Operation Desert Storm; Kosovo War; Operation Allied Force; 1999 F-117A shootdown
- Awards: Distinguished Flying Cross; Purple Heart

Darrell Patrick "Dale" Zelko (born November 30, 1963) is an American retired United States Air Force officer and military aviator.

== Early life ==
Darrel Patrick "Dale" Zelko was born on 30 November 1963 in the United States. His paternal grandparents immigrated from Slovenia, which at the time was a part of Yugoslavia. He attended the United States Air Force Academy, where he graduated and received his commission as an officer in the Air Force.

== Military career ==
Zelko served as a combat pilot and a tactical flight instructor in the United States Air Force, accumulating more than 3,000 total flight hours, including over 100 combat hours. During his career, he initially qualified on the Cessna T-37 Tweet trainer and the Fairchild Republic A-10 Thunderbolt II close air support aircraft.

He subsequently transitioned to the Lockheed F-117 Nighthawk stealth attack aircraft, serving with the 49th Fighter Wing at Holloman Air Force Base, New Mexico. Zelko flew operational combat missions during the 1991 Gulf War under Operation Desert Storm, and later deployed to Europe for combat operations during the 1999 Kosovo War.

== 1999 shootdown and rescue ==
On March 27, 1999, during Operation Allied Force, Zelko was flying an F-117A Nighthawk (tail number 82-0806) under the callsign Vega 31. While returning from a bombing mission over Belgrade, his aircraft was targeted and struck near Buđanovci, Serbia, by an S-125 Neva (NATO designation SA-3 Goa) surface-to-air missile fired by a Yugoslav air defense unit under the command of Colonel Zoltán Dani. Zelko ejected safely from the crippled aircraft and descended into a cultivated field. Using survival equipment and tactical evasion procedures, he evaded searching Yugoslav military and police units by concealing himself in a drainage ditch. Following approximately eight hours on the ground, Zelko was successfully extracted during a nighttime combat search and rescue (CSAR) operation executed by a U.S. Air Force team utilizing MH-53 and HH-60 helicopters.

== Post-military and personal life ==
Following his retirement from active service in the Air Force, Zelko relocated to New Hampshire. He is married to Lauren Zelko.

In his post-military career, Zelko worked as a public speaker focusing on international reconciliation. In 2011, he traveled to Serbia to meet Zoltán Dani, the former Yugoslav air defense commander responsible for the 1999 shootdown incident. The ongoing relationship between the two families became the subject of a 2012 feature-length documentary film, titled The Second Meeting.

== See also ==
- 1999 F-117A shootdown
