= Syed Jafar =

Syed Ali Jafar (Hindi: सैयद जफ़र) is an Indian-American electrical engineer and computer scientist. He works at the University of California, Irvine, and has previously worked at Lucent Bell Labs, Qualcomm and Hughes Software Systems. His research interests include multi-user information theory, Wireless communications and network coding. He was named Fellow of the Institute of Electrical and Electronics Engineers (IEEE) in 2014 "for contributions to analyzing the capacity of Wireless communication networks" and won the Blavatnik Award for Young Scientists in 2015 "for his discoveries in interference alignment in wireless networks, changing the field’s thinking about how these networks should be designed."

== Career ==
He studied electrical engineering at the Indian Institute of Technology (IIT) in Delhi, where he earned a B.Tech in 1997. He then studied electrical engineering in the United States, receiving an MSc at the California Institute of Technology in 1999 and then a PhD at Stanford University in 2003. He then worked at University of California, Irvine, while occasionally also holding positions at Lucent Bell Labs, Qualcomm and Hughes Software Systems. He studied communications networks. He solved problems in network information theory, and made numerous discoveries in the area of wireless communication and networks, including important discoveries in interference alignment in wireless networks.

== Interference alignment ==
An important discovery in wireless network design is interference alignment. A specialized application was previously studied by Yitzhak Birk and Tomer Kol for an index coding problem in 1998. In the context of interference management for wireless communication, interference alignment was first introduced by Mohammad Ali Maddah-Ali, Abolfazl S. Motahari, and Amir Keyvan Khandani, from the University of Waterloo, for wireless X channel. Interference alignment was eventually established as a general principle by Jafar and Viveck R. Cadambe in 2008, when they introduced "a mechanism to align an arbitrarily large number of interferers, leading to the surprising conclusion that wireless networks are not essentially interference limited." This led to the adoption of interference alignment in the design of wireless networks.

Jafar explained:

My research group crystallized the concept of interference alignment and showed that through interference alignment, it is possible for everyone to access half of the total bandwidth free from interference. Initially this result was shown under a number of idealized assumptions that are typical in theoretical studies. We have since continued to work on peeling off these idealizations one at a time, to bring the theory closer to practice. Along the way, we have made numerous discoveries through the lens of interference alignment, which reveal new and powerful signaling schemes.

According to New York University senior researcher Paul Horn:

Syed Jafar revolutionized our understanding of the capacity limits of wireless networks. He demonstrated the astounding result that each user in a wireless network can access half of the spectrum without interference from other users, regardless of how many users are sharing the spectrum. This is a truly remarkable result that has a tremendous impact on both information theory and the design of wireless networks.
