= Integrated topside design =

Naval architecture design methodology

Integrated topside design is a design approach used by military ship and ship equipment designers to overcome the challenges of effectively operating shipboard antenna systems and equipment susceptible to electromagnetic fields in the high electromagnetic environment of a warship's topside. The approach primarily uses the well-understood physics of electromagnetism to simulate the topside environment before the equipment is tested for real.

Advances in ship design to accommodate ever more high power antenna systems, numbers of parasitic re-radiating metallic structures (such as cranes and masts) and a requirement to have more sensitive sensors for littoral operations has led to a need for greater consideration of the operation of equipment prior to ship build or prior to equipment deployment. Whilst this can be done post-deployment using measurement teams, using a modelling and simulation approach early in the ship design is more cost-effective than making corrections after the ship is built, and so is the preferred option for several of the world's advanced navies.
