= Inter-flow interference =

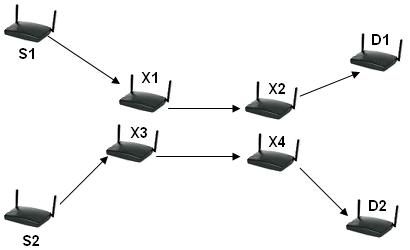
In such a wireless topology with 2 path flows (S1-D1 and S2-D2), at any given time either wireless transmission from S1-X1, or S2-X3, can be functional. Similarly either X1-X2, or X3-X4, can operate any given time slot to avoid inter-flow interference.

In wireless routing, inter-flow interference refers to the interference between neighboring routers competing for the same busy channel.

The inter-flow interference routing metric is incorporated in MIC and iAWARE wireless routing protocol.

== See also ==
- Collision domain
- Interference (communication)
- Intra-flow interference
