= Intra-flow interference =

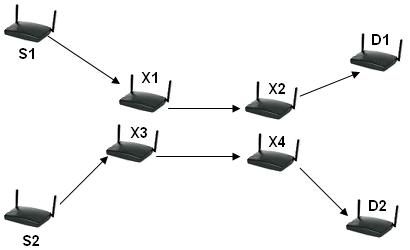
For wireless transmission from S1 to D1, either S1-X1 and X2-D1, or X1-X2, can operate at any given time slot to avoid intra-flow interference between the links.

Intra-flow interference is interference between intermediate routers sharing the same flow path.

== Application ==
In Wireless routing, routing protocol WCETT, MIC and iAWARE incorporate consideration to the intra-flow interference metric.

== See also ==
- Collision domain
- Inter-flow interference
- Interference (communication)
