= 1999 F-117A shootdown =

1999 aviation accident in Yugoslavia

- Part of the NATO bombing of Yugoslavia
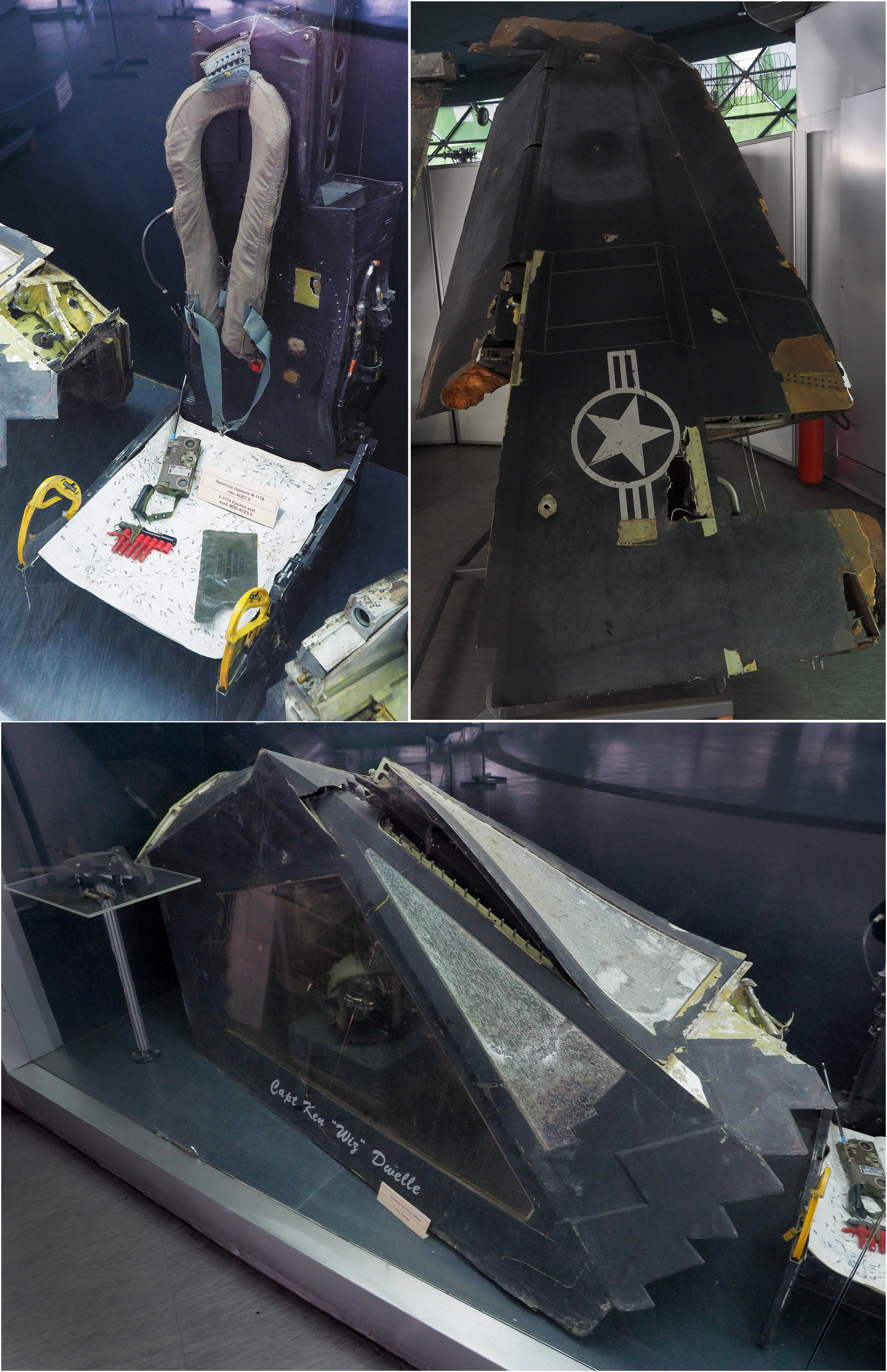
- Ejection seat, wing and canopy of F-117 with serial number 82-0806 at the Belgrade Aviation Museum in late 2018.
- Type: Aircraft shootdown
- Location: Near Buđanovci, Serbia, Yugoslavia; 44°54′N 19°52′E
- Target: NATO warplanes
- Date: 27 March 1999; 8:15 p.m.
- Executed by: 250th Air Defense Missile Brigade, Army of Yugoslavia

On 27 March 1999, during the NATO bombing of Yugoslavia amid the Kosovo War, a Yugoslav Army unit shot down a Lockheed F-117 Nighthawk stealth ground attack aircraft of the United States Air Force (USAF) by firing an S-125 Neva/Pechora surface-to-air missile. It was the first ever shootdown of a stealth aircraft. The pilot ejected safely and was rescued eight hours later by USAF Pararescuemen conducting search and rescue.

The F-117 had entered service with the U.S. Air Force in 1983. It was believed its stealth technology would protect it from relatively obsolete Yugoslav air defenses. The wreckage was mostly intact, creating fears that the sensitive technology would be disseminated. The US military initially prepared F-15E fighters to destroy the wreckage, but claimed to abort the strike due to civilians at the site. It later claimed that it considered the F-117's technology outdated. Russian officials examined the wreckage, potentially contributing to the development of the Sukhoi Su-57 fighter and under development Tupolev PAK DA bomber. China also allegedly purchased wreckage parts, contributing to the Chengdu J-20 fighter.

== Downing ==
On 27 March 1999, the 3rd Battalion of the 250th Air Defense Missile Brigade of the Army of Yugoslavia, under the command of Lt. Colonel (later Colonel) Zoltán Dani, downed F-117 Air Force serial number 82-0806, callsign "Vega 31".

The Army of Yugoslavia unit was equipped with a Yugoslav version of the Soviet Isayev S-125 "Neva" missile system (NATO reporting name, SA-3 "Goa").

At about 8:15 p.m. local time, several missiles with a range of about 8 miles (13 km) were launched. The F-117 was not acquired on radar, despite claims by the Serbian military, but tracked visually from its take-off base in Italy, flying repeatedly on the same track for several days, and the SA-3 missiles were launched at the expected crossover point to where the F-117 was flying, fragmentation causing the loss of the aircraft.

The F-117, callsign "Vega-31", was being flown by Lt. Col. Darrell Patrick "Dale" Zelko (born 30 November 1963), an Operation Desert Storm veteran. He observed the two missiles rise through the low cloud cover and head straight for his aircraft. The first passed over him, close enough to cause buffeting, but did not detonate. The second missile detonated nearby, its shrapnel and shockwave causing significant damage to the aircraft and causing it to tumble out of control. The explosion was large enough to be seen from a NATO Boeing KC-135 Stratotanker flying over Bosnia.

Zelko was subject to intense g-forces as the aircraft tumbled and had great difficulty in assuming the correct posture for ejecting. After his parachute deployed, he used his survival radio to issue a mayday call and was able to contact the KC-135 that had seen him shot down. Contrary to his training, Zelko used his survival radio while still descending, reasoning that the altitude would give his signal the best possible range.

Zelko landed in a field south of Ruma and around a mile/kilometer south of a four-lane highway, now part of European route E70. He quickly concealed himself in a drainage ditch that he had identified as a hole-up site while descending. There, he felt the shock waves of bombs dropped by NATO bombers on targets on the outskirts of Belgrade. Zelko landed around a mile/kilometer from his aircraft's crash site, and an intensive search of the area was carried out by the Yugoslav soldiers, policemen, and local villagers. At one point, searchers came within a few hundred meters of the ditch he was hiding in. Zelko was rescued approximately eight hours later by a U.S. Air Force combat search and rescue team (SSgt. Eric Giacchino and SrA. John M. Jordan) flying in two Sikorsky MH-53 helicopters and a Sikorsky HH-60 Pave Hawk in the early hours of the next morning. According to Zelko, he would later learn that he had been minutes away from being captured. He was initially misidentified in press reports, as the name "Capt Ken 'Wiz' Dwelle" was painted on the aircraft's canopy. The lost F-117 carried the name "Something Wicked" and had previously flown 39 sorties during the Persian Gulf War's Operation Desert Storm.

=== Attempt to destroy the wreckage ===
Photographs show that the aircraft struck the ground at low speed in an inverted position, and that the airframe remained relatively intact. F-15E Strike Eagles armed with AGM-130 missiles were immediately put on alert for a mission to destroy the wreckage, but by the time it could positively determine the crash site, a CNN crew and other civilians had arrived there. The resulting capture of the wreckage by Yugoslav forces surprised analysts and pilots. Paul G. Kaminski, who played a major role in the F-117's development, argued that despite the aircraft's service reaching 15 years, "there are things in that airplane, while they may not be leading technologies today in the United States, are certainly ahead of what some potential adversaries have." and clarified that he feared the development of foreign stealth aircraft more than the counter-stealth technology. Conversely, the US government downplayed the impact, arguing the F-117 was based on 1970s technology, the military had revealed its existence in 1988, and the aircraft often appeared at air shows. General Bruce A. Carlson stated that if Serbia gave the wreckage to Russia, the result would be minimal.

On April 2, the Yugoslav government announced its intention to hand over pieces of the downed F-117 to Russian authorities. A Russian trade delegation visited the site, and salvaged materials and systems components. Russian officials later confirmed they had examined the wreckage, contributing to the development of the Sukhoi Su-57 fighter and under development Tupolev PAK DA bomber. China also allegedly purchased wreckage parts, contributing to the Chengdu J-20 fighter. Chinese military and intelligence collaboration with Yugoslavia, including surrounding the wreckage, is speculated to have played a role in the United States bombing of the Chinese embassy in Belgrade on 7 May 1999. In 2011, Croatian admiral Davor Domazet-Lošo, military chief of staff in 1999, told the BBC that Chinese agents had scoured the area where the F-117 "disintegrated", buying recovered components from local farmers. The BBC also cited an anonymous senior Serbian military official that components were recovered by "souvenir collectors", and some were then transferred to "foreign military attaches".

== Aftermath ==
Zoltán Dani, now running a bakery, and Dale Zelko, now retired from the U.S. Air Force, met in 2011. They have since developed a friendship.

=== Damage to other NATO aircraft ===
A second F-117 was reportedly targeted and possibly struck during Operation Allied Force, with the incident alleged to have occurred on 30 April 1999. The aircraft is said to have returned in a damaged condition to Spangdahlem Air Base, but reportedly did not fly again. Despite this incident, the United States Air Force continued to operate the F-117 throughout the duration of the campaign. The event was later corroborated by another F-117A pilot in 2020; however, the incident remains classified, and only limited details have been disclosed.

On 2 May 1999, the 250th Air Defense Missile Brigade also shot down a USAF General Dynamics F-16CJ Fighting Falcon fighter piloted by future Chief of Staff of the United States Air Force David L. Goldfein. This was the only other NATO crewed aircraft shot down during Operation Allied Force, and one of only three NATO crewed aircraft downed in interventions in the Yugoslav Wars, alongside another F-16 shot down over Bosnia in 1994.

Some pieces of the F-117's wreckage are preserved at the Serbian Museum of Aviation in Belgrade. A small rubber part of the plane was shown as "a souvenir" to Western journalists by Serbian warlord Arkan during the NATO air campaign. The USAF retired its F-117s in 2008.

== Gallery ==
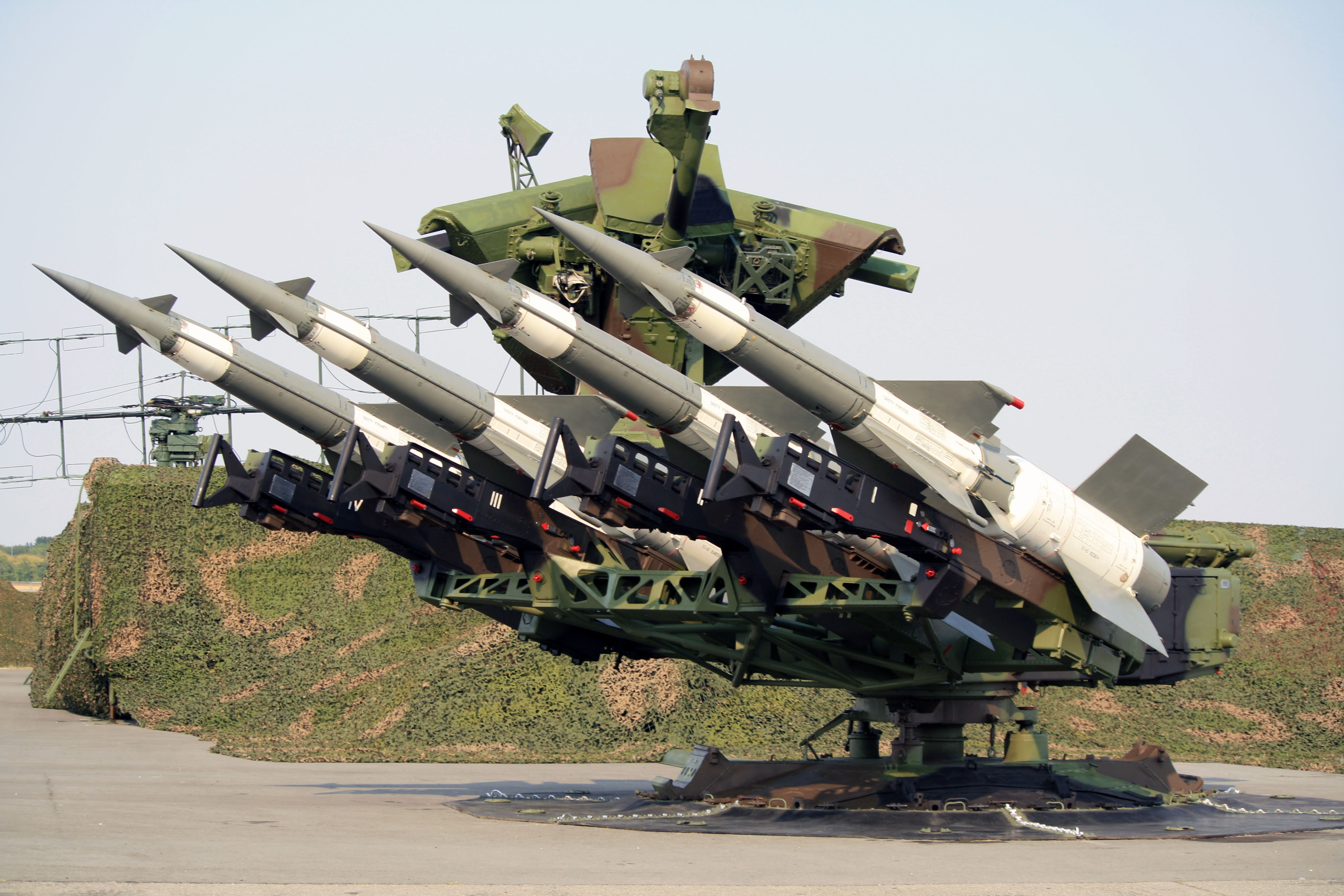
S-125 Neva air defense system, from the Serbian 250th Air Defense Brigade, on display at a public open day (2012)

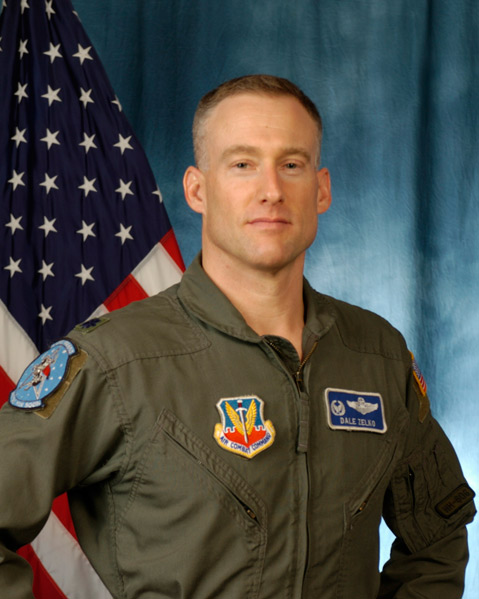
Lt. Colonel Darrell Patrick "Dale" Zelko was the pilot of the downed F-117A

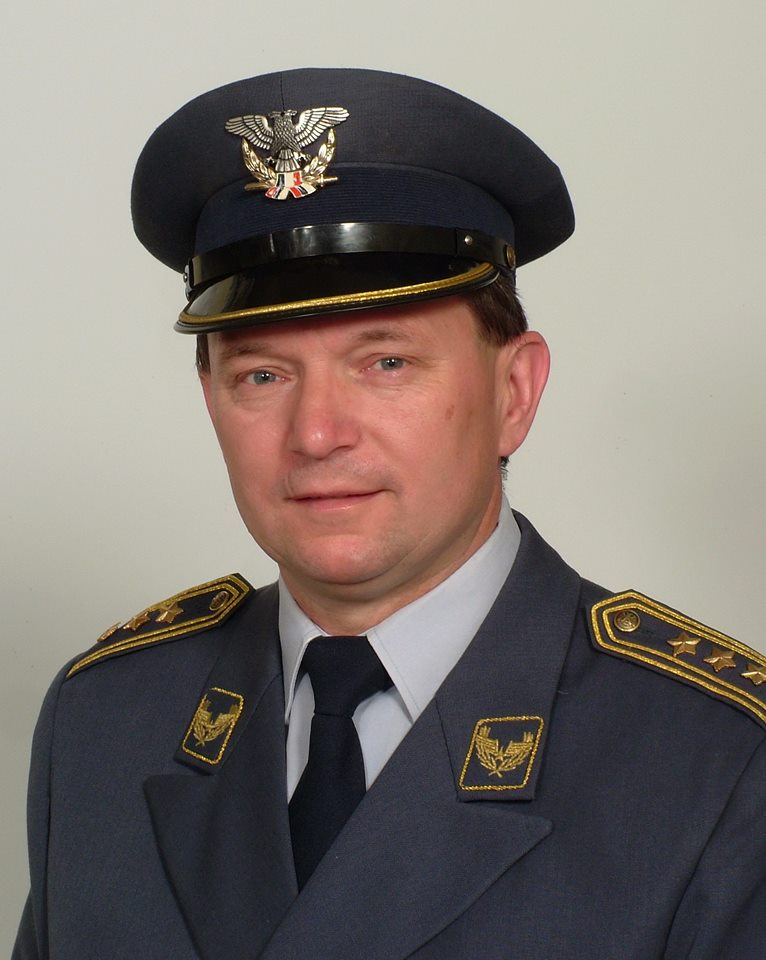
Colonel Zoltán Dani was the commander of the 3rd Battalion of the 250th Air Defense Missile Brigade of the Army of Yugoslavia

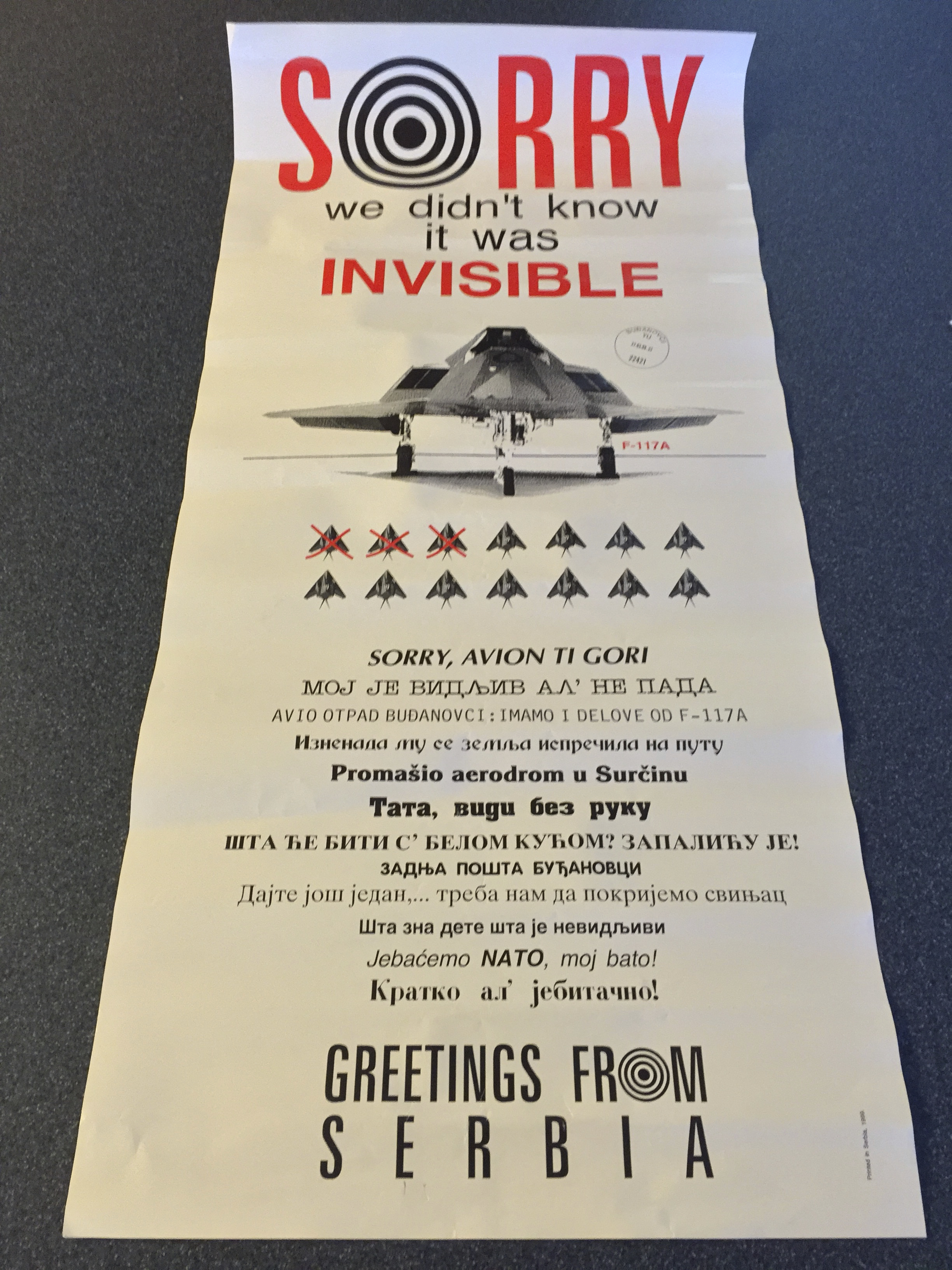
A poster celebrating the shootdown and listing unsubstantiated claims of two other F-117A shootdowns
