= Interference (communication) =

Disruptive modification of a signal

Sample of effects of interference (mobile phone)

In telecommunications, an interference is that which modifies a signal in a disruptive manner, as it travels along a communication channel between its source and receiver. The term is often used to refer to the addition of unwanted signals to a useful signal. Common examples include:

- Electromagnetic interference (EMI)
- Co-channel interference (CCI), also known as crosstalk
- Adjacent-channel interference (ACI)
- Intersymbol interference (ISI)
- Inter-carrier interference (ICI), caused by doppler shift in OFDM modulation (multitone modulation).
- Common-mode interference (CMI)
- Conducted interference

Noise is a form of interference but not all interference is noise. Noise can also have multiple causes, such as temperature and material makeup of nearby objects and electronics. Dithering is a form of noise that can be used on purpose. In CDMA channels, interference can specifically be linked to simultaneous accessing of a single, identical channel by multiple individuals.

Radio resource management aims at reducing and controlling the co-channel and adjacent-channel interference.

== Reducing interference ==
There are several methods of reducing the impact of interference depending on circumstance. This process is sometimes labeled 'interference suppression', which, ideally, reduces interference without distorting any original signals.

Reduction of interference is of high-priority among military channels which may be the target of jamming by enemies. Military channels have options to avoid this and also increase security. A channel can operate on a bandwidth more vast than what is necessary through spread spectrum communications; the idea behind this is that operating on more bandwidth lowers likelihood of jamming and detection.

Purposeful jamming is not always done against military channels. In fact, many departments may choose to jam their own signals to increase privacy and security. These can include law enforcement and police, who may want to keep local broadcasts hidden or prevent other broadcasts from aiding prisoners and possible enemies. On the other hand, civilian use of jammers is typically restricted. In the United States, selling jammers is regular individuals is unlawful. Similarly, attempting to connect to federal channels protected by interference may incur consequences.

Having several options between available frequencies and bandwidths can allow for avoidance of interference rather than direct suppression. For small stations such as ham radio, which can be powered in a single home, suppression may be more effective. In the case of one-way transmission, drop filters, which prevent certain frequencies, can be used. However, having a large presence of electronics nearby can have the side effect of creating increased noise and electromagnetic interference.

== Interference alignment ==
A solution to interference problems in Wireless communication networks is interference alignment, which was crystallized by Syed Ali Jafar at the University of California, Irvine. A specialized application was previously studied by Yitzhak Birk and Tomer Kol for an index coding problem in 1998. For interference management in wireless communication, interference alignment was originally introduced by Mohammad Ali Maddah-Ali, Abolfazl S. Motahari, and Amir Keyvan Khandani, at the University of Waterloo, for communication over wireless X channels. Interference alignment was eventually established as a general principle by Jafar and Viveck R. Cadambe in 2008, when they introduced "a mechanism to align an arbitrarily large number of interferers, leading to the surprising conclusion that wireless networks are not essentially interference limited." This led to the adoption of interference alignment in the design of wireless networks.

Jafar explained:

My research group crystallized the concept of interference alignment and showed that through interference alignment, it is possible for everyone to access half of the total bandwidth free from interference. Initially this result was shown under a number of idealized assumptions that are typical in theoretical studies. We have since continued to work on peeling off these idealizations one at a time, to bring the theory closer to practice. Along the way we have made numerous discoveries through the lens of interference alignment, which reveal new and powerful signaling schemes.

According to New York University senior researcher Paul Horn:

Syed Jafar revolutionized our understanding of the capacity limits of wireless networks. He demonstrated the astounding result that each user in a wireless network can access half of the spectrum without interference from other users, regardless of how many users are sharing the spectrum. This is a truly remarkable result that has a tremendous impact on both information theory and the design of wireless networks.

== See also ==
- Distortion
- Degradation (telecommunications)
- Inter-flow interference
- Intra-flow interference
- Meaconing
- Signal-to-interference ratio (SIR)
- Signal-to-noise plus interference (SNIR)
