= David L. Goldfein =

US Air Force general (born 1959)

David Goldfein
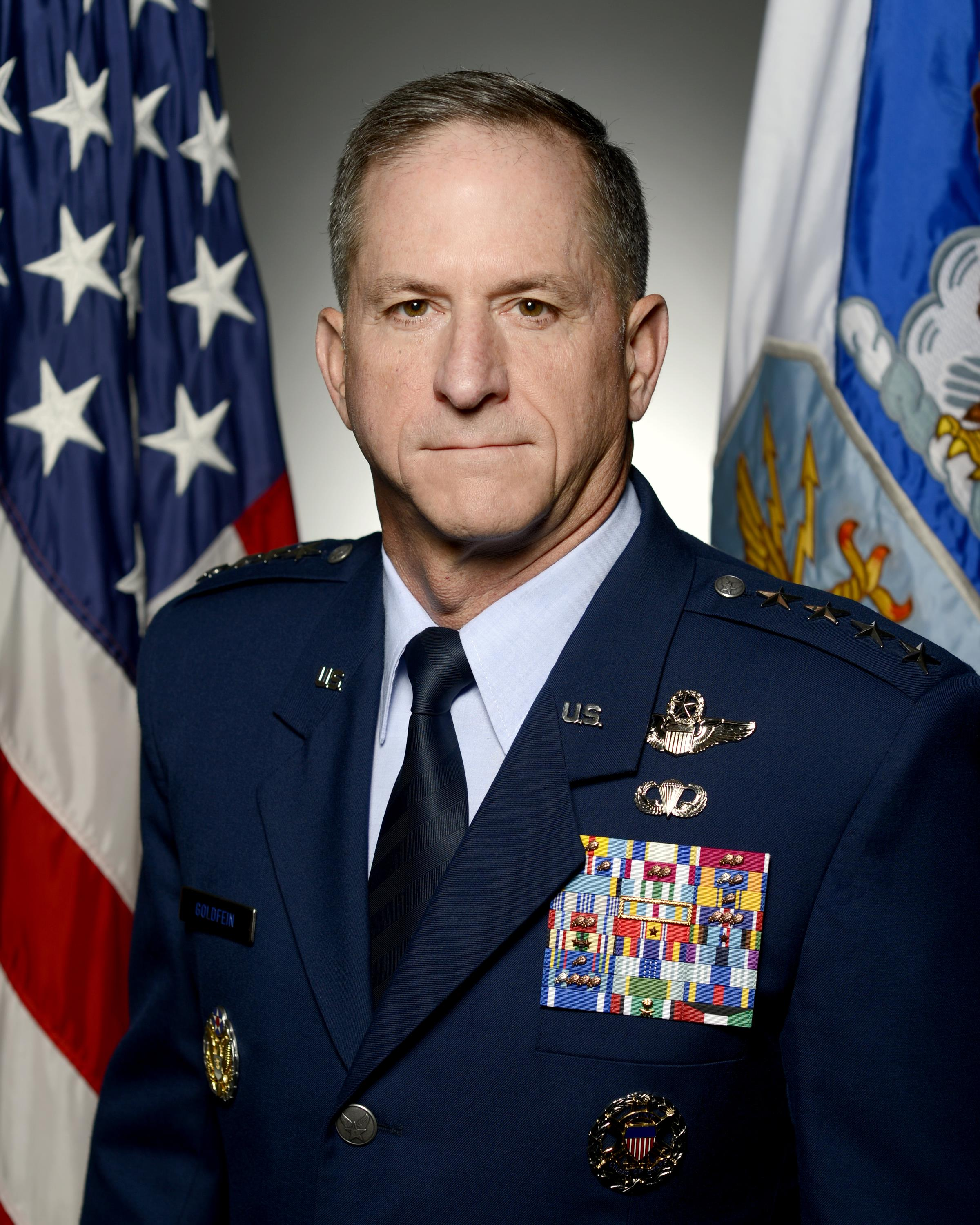
- Born: December 21, 1959 (age 66); Laon-Couvron Air Base, France
- Allegiance: United States
- Branch: United States Air Force
- Service years: 1983–2020
- Rank: General
- Commands: Chief of Staff of the United States Air Force; United States Air Forces Central Command; 49th Fighter Wing; 52nd Fighter Wing; 366th Operations Group; 555th Fighter Squadron
- Conflicts: Gulf War; Operation Allied Force; (shot down)
- Awards: Defense Distinguished Service Medal (3); Air Force Distinguished Service Medal; Legion of Merit (3)
- Education: United States Air Force Academy (BS); Oklahoma City University (MBA)

David Lee Goldfein (born December 21, 1959) is a retired United States Air Force four-star general who last served as the 21st Chief of Staff of the United States Air Force. He previously served as the vice chief of staff of the Air Force and, prior to that, he served as the director of the Joint Staff, a position within the Joint Chiefs of Staff who assists the chairman of the Joint Chiefs of Staff. Goldfein retired from the Air Force on October 1, 2020, after over 37 years of service.

== Early life and education ==
Born at Laon-Couvron Air Base in France, Goldfein is the son of William Michael "Goldie" Goldfein (November 26, 1931 – June 19, 2019) and Mary Vanni. His paternal grandfather, Boatswain's mate second class Joseph William Goldfein (June 25, 1896 – June 19, 1974), served in World War I with the United States Navy, and his father was a colonel in the Air Force from 1949 to 1982 and fought in the Vietnam War. After his retirement, Goldfein's father worked for the Combined Federal Campaign in Las Vegas for 5 years and then the Link Aviation Devices in Binghamton, New York for 5 years. His elder brother, Stephen M. Goldfein also served in the Air Force from 1978 to 2008, retiring as a major general; Stephen Goldfein also served as Director of the Joint Staff, a position his brother David would later hold. David Goldfein received his commission from the United States Air Force Academy, where he received a B.S. degree in philosophy in 1983. He is also a graduate of the U.S. Air Force Weapons School at Nellis AFB. He is a Distinguished Eagle Scout and former ranger at the Philmont Scout Ranch.

== Military career ==
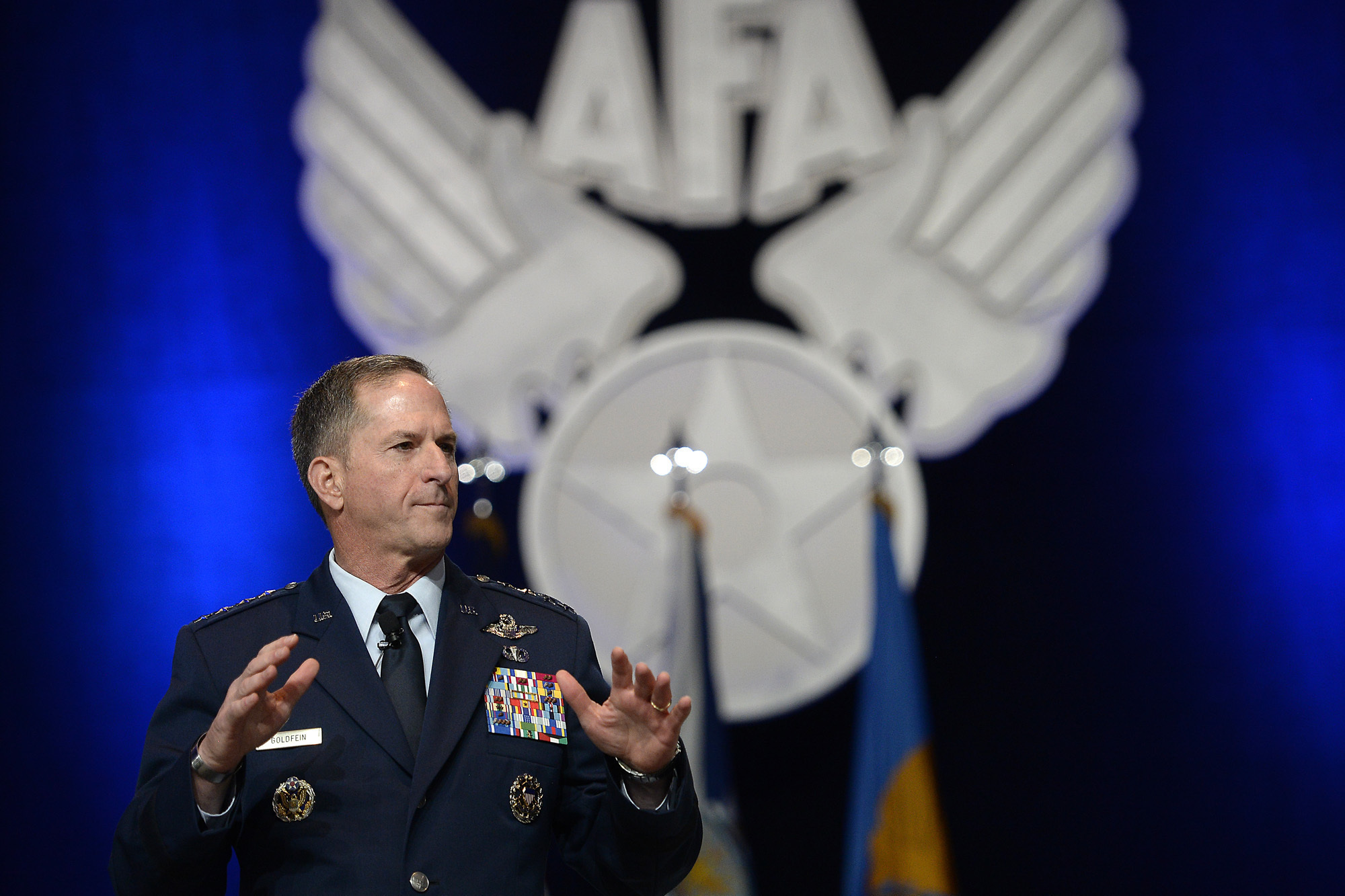
Goldfein gives his first "Air Force Update" at the Air Force Association in September 2016.

Goldfein is a Command Pilot with more than 4,200 flying hours with the T-37, T-38, F-16C/D, F-117A, MC-12W, and MQ-9.

Goldfein commanded United States Air Forces Central, Shaw AFB, SC and Al Udeid AB, Qatar; 49th Fighter Wing, Holloman AFB, NM; 52d Fighter Wing, Spangdahlem AB, Germany; 366th Operations Group, Mountain Home AFB, ID; and the 555th Fighter Squadron, Aviano AB, Italy.

Goldfein flew combat missions during the Gulf War, and later deployed to the Vicenza Combined Air Operations Center for Operation Deliberate Force. As commander of the 555th Fighter Squadron, he led his squadron flying an F-16 fighter in Operation Allied Force. During the operation, on 2 May 1999, Goldfein's F-16 was shot down over western Serbia by a S-125 surface-to-air missile fired by officer (future Lt. General) Tiosav Janković from the 3rd Battery of the 250th Air Defense Missile Brigade of the Yugoslav Air Force. Goldfein successfully ejected, and was subsequently rescued by NATO helicopters. This was one of only two crewed NATO aircraft shot down during the operation, the other was an F-117A in March.

=== Chief of Staff of the Air Force ===
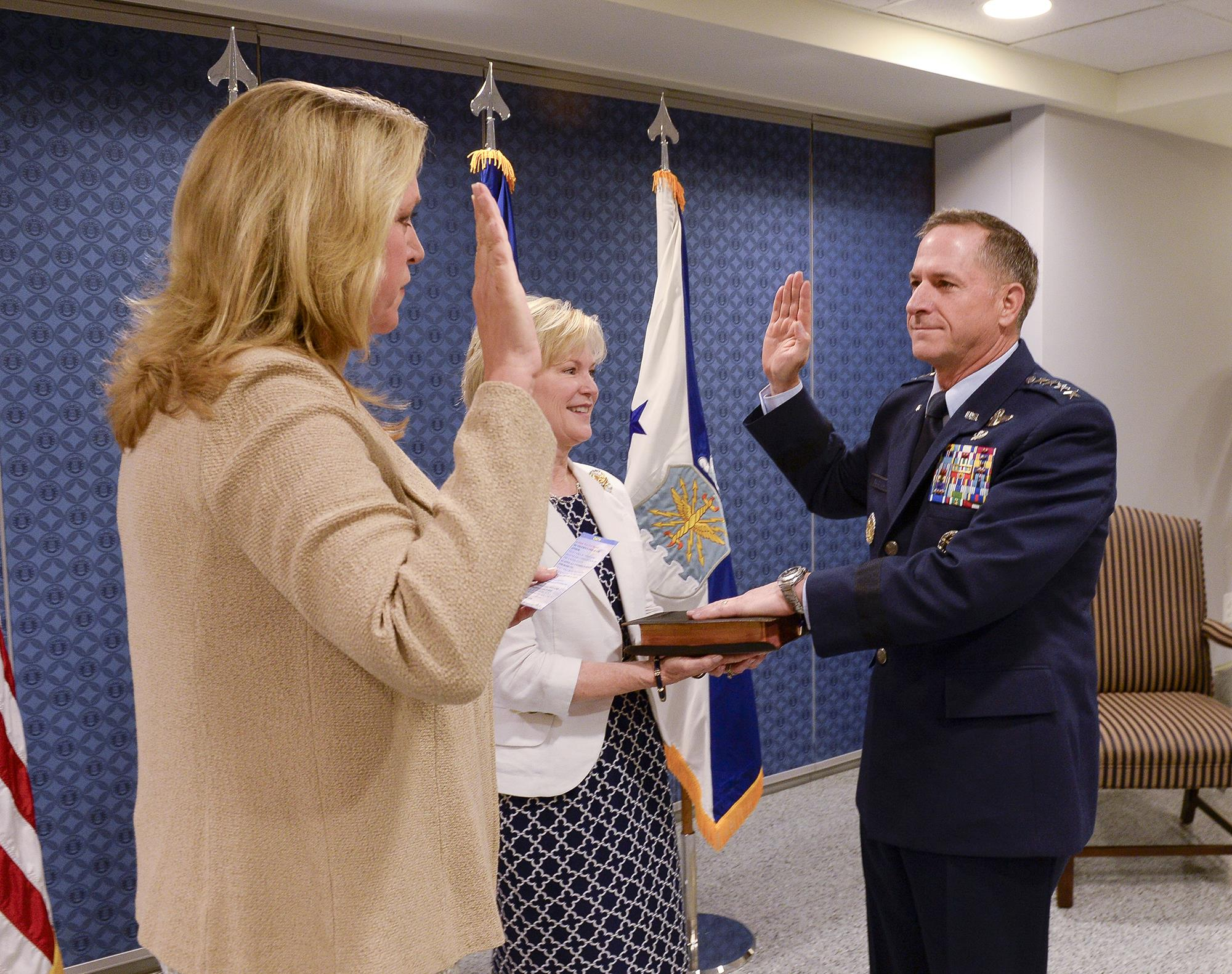
Goldfein is sworn in as the 21st chief of staff of the Air Force by Secretary of the Air Force Deborah Lee James, July 1, 2016.

On April 26, 2016, Defense Secretary Ash Carter announced that President Obama had nominated Goldfein to succeed General Mark Welsh as the 21st Chief of Staff of the Air Force. Goldfein's experience as a consensus builder, as well as his role in formulating the Air Force's contributions to the Defense Department's third offset strategy were cited by Carter and Secretary of the Air Force Deborah Lee James as reasons for his selection. His confirmation hearing took place on June 16, and he succeeded Welsh on July 1, two days after his confirmation.

As CSAF, Goldfein spearheaded the Joint All-Domain Command and Control (JADC2) and Advanced Battle Management (ABMS) systems, designed to connect service-level networks, platforms and sensors into a network for communicating battle information across the joint force. The aim of rapidly connecting all aircraft data and sensors to each other, as well as, to other military assets was a special focus of the subject as he led the service. He prioritized restoring the squadron as the principal warfighting unit of the Air Force, giving squadron commanders greater autonomy over their units, standardizing squadron command responsibilities and delegating more financial resources to squadron-level activities. Goldfein also led a proposal to increase from 312 to 386 operational squadrons. In September 2016, Goldfein personally selected the name "Raider" from more than 2000 naming submissions for the prototype B-21 bomber, in honor of the Doolittle Raiders.

Goldfein initially opposed the creation of an independent space force, concerned that the creation of a new service branch would, through competition for a larger share of the Defense budget, compromise joint warfighting capability in the space domain. He remarked that establishing the Space Force would create a "balancing act" of building a service branch based on joint warfighting capability while simultaneously developing its own service culture. He eventually became supportive of the plan upon engagement with field commanders at Maxwell Air Force Base, many of whom supported the need for a separate service branch. Goldfein said in an interview with National Defense that "a service chief singularly focused on space, space operations and space integration" could expedite military profitability in the space domain more efficiently than under the umbrella of the Air Force.

In August 2017, Goldfein joined other members of the Joint Chiefs of Staff in condemning racism in the wake of the Unite the Right rally in Charlottesville, which was organized by an ex-Marine. In June 2020, Goldfein publicly denounced the murder of George Floyd in a memo, calling it a "national tragedy" and adding that Americans "should be outraged" at the brutality shown during the incident. He supported his senior enlisted advisor, Chief Kaleth O. Wright, who responded to Floyd's murder on social media. Alongside Air Force secretary Barbara Barrett, Goldfein subsequently directed an inspector general investigation into racial inequality and advancement opportunities for African-Americans in the Air Force.

Goldfein's term as Air Force chief of staff ended on August 6, 2020, and he was succeeded by General Charles Q. Brown Jr., who was confirmed in June. He retired in October of the same year.

=== Candidate for Chairman of the Joint Chiefs of Staff ===
Goldfein was a candidate to replace General Joseph Dunford as Chairman of the Joint Chiefs of Staff in 2019. He was favored for the appointment by both Dunford and Secretary of Defense Jim Mattis. President Donald Trump, who was feuding with Mattis, nominated General Mark Milley instead. Goldfein did not express any rancor over not being selected, stating that the president had "the absolute right and responsibility to pick the principal military adviser that he wants."

== Post-retirement ==
Three and a half months after retiring, Goldfein joined the investment firm Blackstone. He also began serving as a Senior Fellow at the Johns Hopkins Applied Physics Laboratory in March 2021. In March 2023, Goldfein joined Shield Capital's National Security Advisory Board, alongside H. R. McMaster, Letitia Long, James G. Stavridis and Sean Stackley. Goldfein chairs the board of Google Public Sector, focused on applying Google solutions to government. He also chairs the board of Draken International LLC, a company focused on increasing the combat readiness of US and allied/partner forces. He chairs the National Board of Governors of the USO, the premier service organization that supports military troops and families both deployed and at home. Goldfein is a Distinguished Visiting Fellow at the Hoover Institute at Stanford alongside former SecDEF Jim Mattis and Adm (ret) Jim Ellis. He also serves as an advisor for Anduril. Goldfein was selected as a Distinguished Graduate of the USAF Academy in 2022.

== Assignments ==
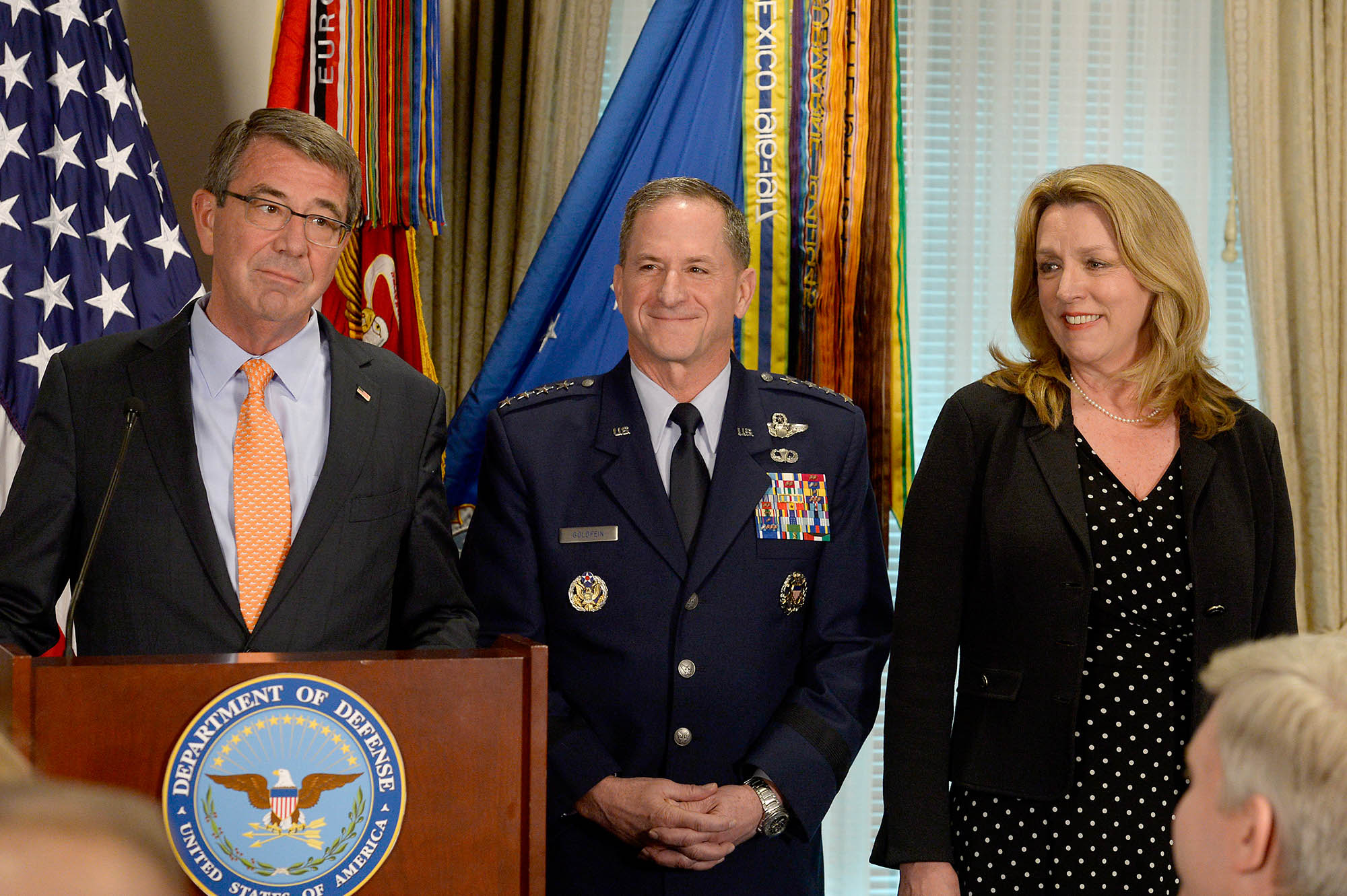
Goldfein with Secretary of Defense Ash Carter and Secretary of the Air Force Deborah Lee James at the Pentagon, April 2016.

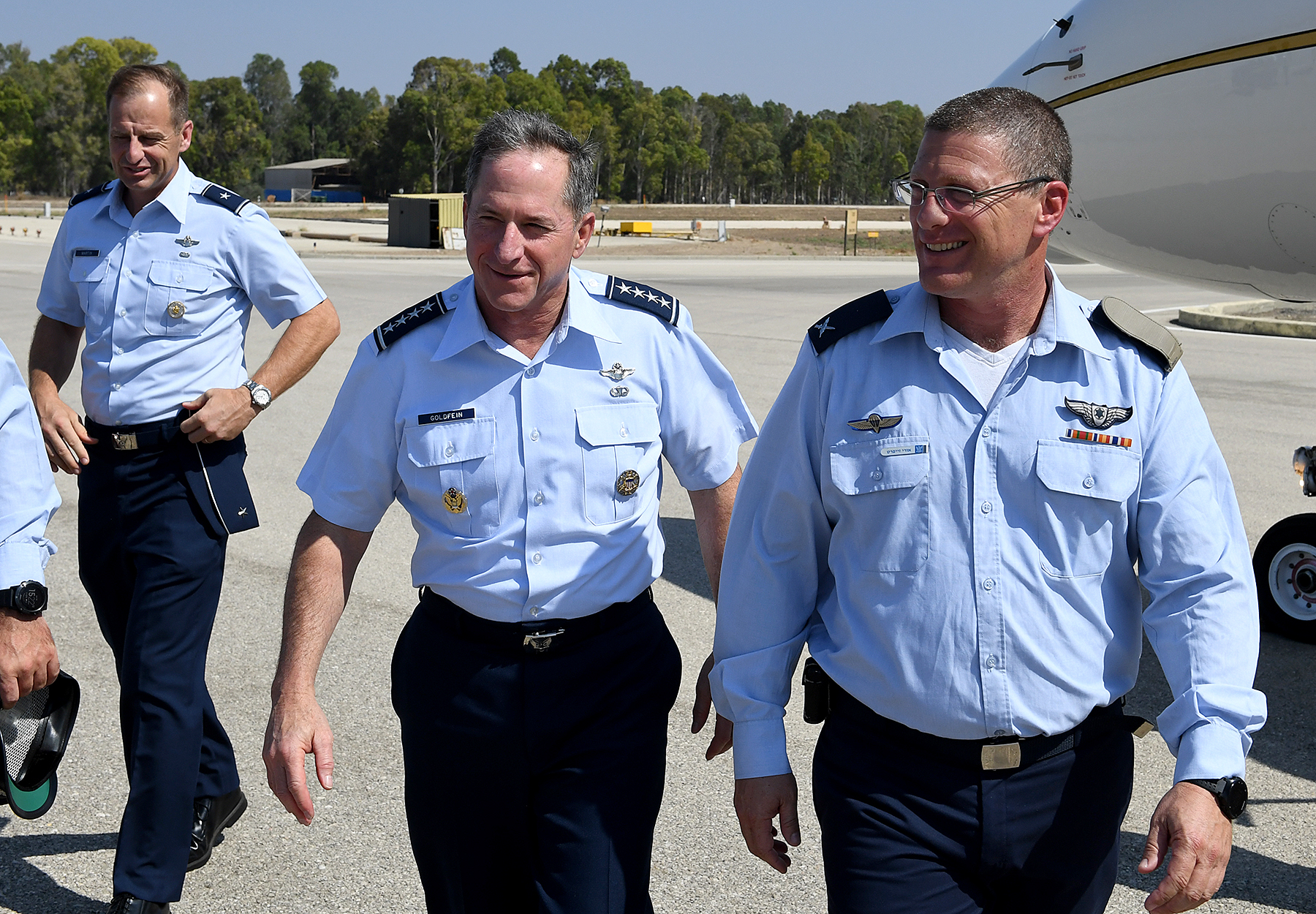
Goldfein during a visit to Israel in August 2017.

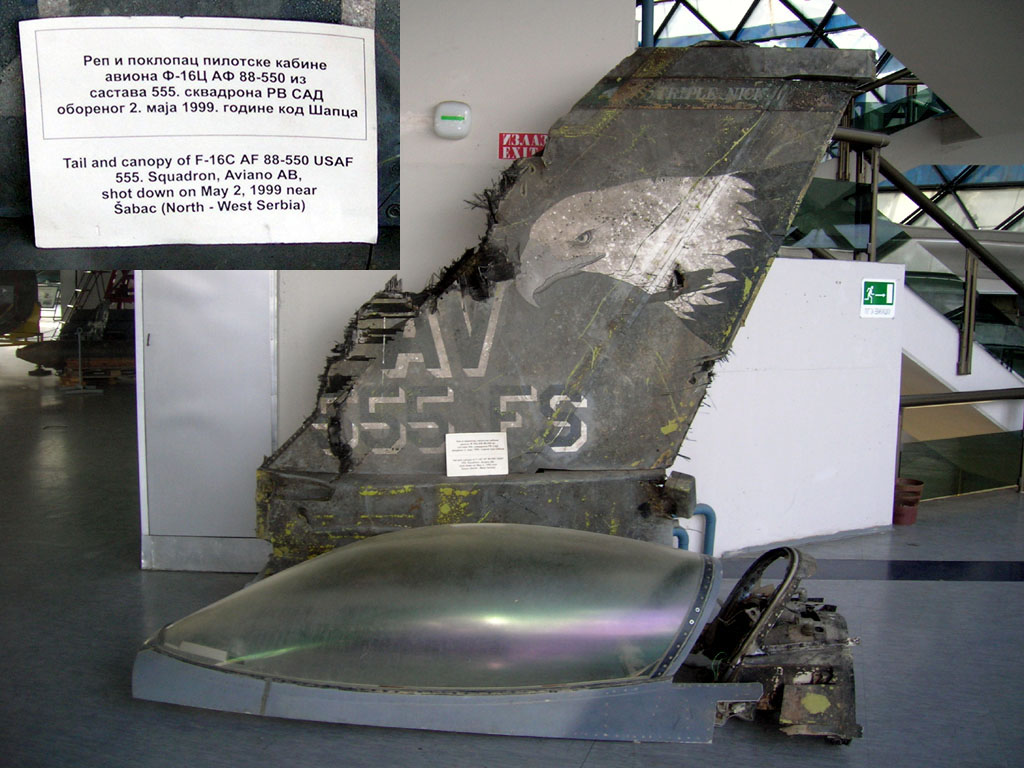
Tail and canopy of Goldfein's F-16CG, shot down during Operation Allied Force, at the Museum of Aviation, Belgrade

1. October 1983 – October 1984, student, undergraduate pilot training, Sheppard AFB, Texas
2. October 1984 – February 1988, T-38 instructor pilot, 90th Flying Training Squadron, Sheppard AFB, Texas
3. February 1988 – January 1992, F-16 instructor pilot and flight commander, 17th Tactical Fighter Squadron, Shaw AFB, S.C.
4. January 1992 – June 1992, student, USAF Fighter Weapons Instructor Course, Nellis AFB, Nev.
5. June 1992 – July 1994, squadron weapons officer and Chief, Wing Weapons and Tactics, 366th Composite Wing, Mountain Home AFB, Idaho
6. July 1994 – June 1995, student, Air Command and Staff College, Maxwell AFB, Ala.
7. June 1995 – May 1996, special assistant to the Commander, Allied Air Forces Southern Europe and Sixteenth Air Force, Naples, Italy
8. May 1996 – August 1997, executive officer to the Commander, U.S. Air Forces in Europe, Ramstein Air Base, Germany
9. August 1997 – June 1998, operations officer, 555th Fighter Squadron, Aviano AB, Italy
10. June 1998 – July 2000, Commander, 555th Fighter Squadron, Aviano AB, Italy
11. July 2000 – June 2001, student, National Defense Fellow, State Department Senior Seminar, Arlington, Va.
12. July 2001 – July 2002, Deputy Division Chief, Combat Forces, Headquarters U.S. Air Force, Washington, D.C.
13. August 2002 – July 2004, Commander, 366th Operations Group, Mountain Home AFB, Idaho
14. July 2004 – June 2006, Commander, 52d Fighter Wing, Spangdahlem AB, Germany
15. June 2006 – January 2008, Commander, 49th Fighter Wing, Holloman AFB, N.M.
16. January 2008 – August 2009, Deputy Director of Programs, Office of the Deputy Chief of Staff for Strategic Plans and Programs, Headquarters U.S. Air Force, Washington D.C.
17. August 2009 – August 2011, Director of Operations, Air Combat Command, Joint Base Langley-Eustis, Va.
18. August 2011 – July 2013, Commander, U.S. Air Forces Central Command, Southwest Asia
19. August 2013 – August 2015, Director, Joint Staff, the Pentagon, Washington, D.C.
20. August 2015 – July 2016, Vice Chief of Staff of the U.S. Air Force, Washington, D.C.
21. July 2016 – August 2020, Chief of Staff of the U.S. Air Force, Washington, D.C.

== Awards and decorations ==
Personal decorations
	Defense Distinguished Service Medal with two bronze oak leaf clusters
	Air Force Distinguished Service Medal
Width-44 crimson ribbon with a pair of width-2 white stripes on the edges	Legion of Merit with two bronze oak leaf clusters
	Distinguished Flying Cross with Valor device and oak leaf cluster
Width-44 crimson ribbon with two width-8 white stripes at distance 4 from the edges.	Meritorious Service Medal with two bronze oak leaf clusters
	Air Medal with one silver and one bronze oak leaf clusters
	Aerial Achievement Medal with oak leaf cluster
	Joint Service Commendation Medal
	Air Force Commendation Medal with oak leaf cluster
	Air Force Achievement Medal
Unit awards
	Joint Meritorious Unit Award
	Air Force Outstanding Unit Award with three bronze oak leaf clusters
Service Awards
	Combat Readiness Medal with two bronze oak leaf clusters
Campaign and service medals
Width=44 scarlet ribbon with a central width-4 golden yellow stripe, flanked by pairs of width-1 scarlet, white, Old Glory blue, and white stripes	National Defense Service Medal with bronze service star
	Armed Forces Expeditionary Medal with one service star
	Southwest Asia Service Medal with two service stars
	Global War on Terrorism Service Medal
	Humanitarian Service Medal
	Nuclear Deterrence Operations Service Medal with oak leaf cluster
Service, training, and marksmanship awards
	Air Force Overseas Short Tour Service Ribbon
	Air Force Overseas Long Tour Service Ribbon
	Air Force Longevity Service Award with silver and three bronze oak leaf clusters
	Air Force Longevity Service Award (second ribbon to denote tenth award)
	Small Arms Expert Marksmanship Ribbon
	Air Force Training Ribbon
Foreign awards
	Order of Australia, Honorary Officer (AO) in the Military Division
	Air Force Cross of Aeronautical Merit, Grand Cross (Colombia)
ribbon bar	Grand Cordon of the Order of the Rising Sun (Japan)
	Chief of Staff Medal of Appreciation (Israel)
	NATO Medal for Former Yugoslavia
	Kuwait Liberation Medal (Saudi Arabia)
	Kuwait Liberation Medal (Kuwait)

Other accoutrements
US Air Force Command Pilot Badge
Basic Parachutist Badge
Office of the Joint Chiefs of Staff Identification Badge
Headquarters Air Force Badge

== Effective dates of promotion ==
Promotions
Insignia	Rank	Date
	General	August 17, 2015
	Lieutenant General	August 3, 2011
	Major General	July 3, 2010
	Brigadier General	October 1, 2007
	Colonel	April 1, 2001
	Lieutenant Colonel	January 1, 1998
	Major	November 1, 1994
	Captain	June 1, 1987
	First Lieutenant	June 1, 1985
	Second Lieutenant	June 1, 1983

Military offices
Preceded by Kurt Cichowski	Commander of the 49th Fighter Wing; 2006–2008	Succeeded by Jeffrey L. Harrigian
Preceded by Frank Gorenc	Director of Operations of the Air Combat Command; 2009–2011	Succeeded by Charles Lyon
Preceded by Gilmary M. Hostage III	Commander of the United States Air Forces Central Command; 2011–2013	Succeeded by John Hesterman
Preceded by Curtis M. Scaparrotti	Director of the Joint Staff; 2013–2015	Succeeded by William C. Mayville Jr.
Preceded by Larry O. Spencer	Vice Chief of Staff of the United States Air Force; 2015–2016	Succeeded by Stephen W. Wilson
Preceded by Mark Welsh	Chief of Staff of the United States Air Force; 2016–2020	Succeeded by Charles Q. Brown Jr.
