= 555th Fighter Squadron =

US fighter squadron

555th Fighter Squadron

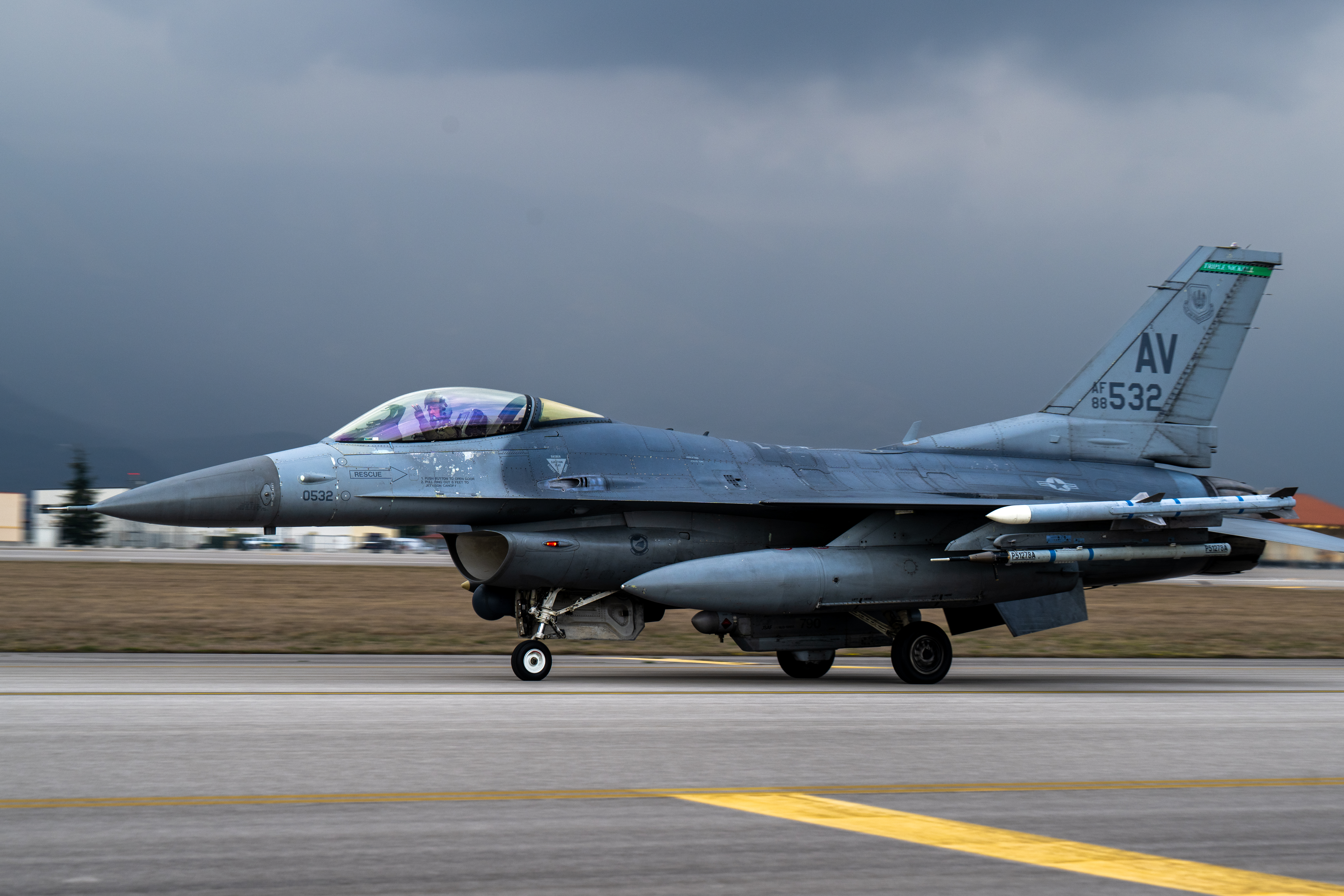
- 555th Fighter Squadron F-16C Fighting Falcon at Aviano Air Base, Italy, 11 March 2025
- Active: 1942–1945; 1964–1994; 1994–present
- Country: United States
- Branch: United States Air Force
- Role: Fighter
- Part of: United States Air Forces in Europe – Air Forces Africa
- Garrison/HQ: Aviano Air Base, Italy
- Nicknames: Triple Nickel; World Famous Highly Respected
- Mottos: Once Green, Always Green
- Colors: Green
- Engagements: European Theater of Operations; Vietnam War; *Operation Bolo; Operation Deny Flight; Operation Deliberate Force; Operation Deliberate Guard; Operation Allied Force; Operation Northern Watch; Operation Southern Watch; Operation Enduring Freedom; Operation Iraqi Freedom; Operation Freedom's Sentinel; Operation Inherent Resolve
- Decorations: Distinguished Unit Citation; Presidential Unit Citation; Air Force Outstanding Unit Award with Combat "V" Device; Air Force Outstanding Unit Award; Republic of Vietnam Gallantry Cross with Palm

Commanders
- Current commander: Lt Col Zane Taylor / The LPA
- Notable commanders: Joseph Kittinger; David L. Goldfein

Insignia
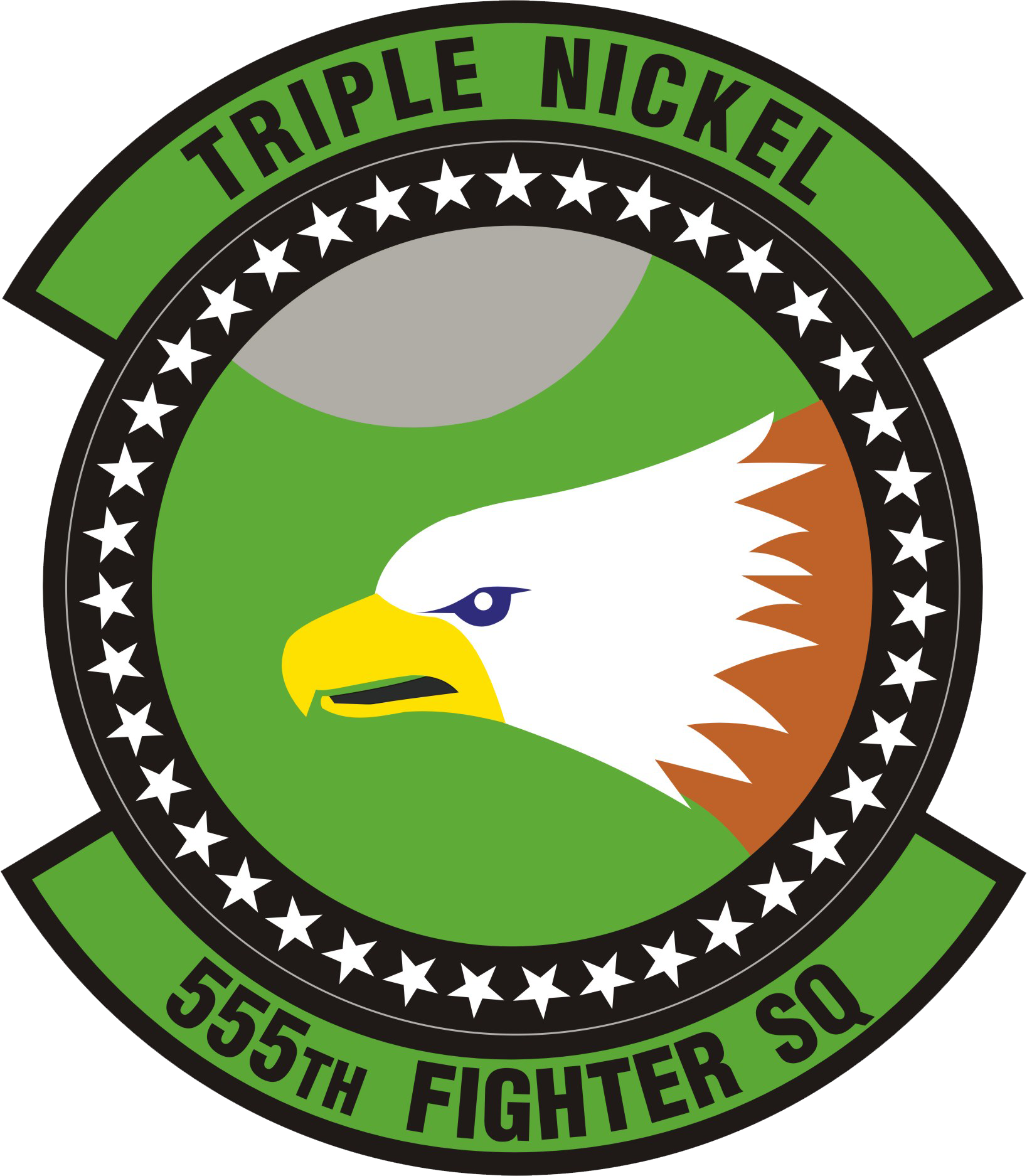
- 555th Fighter Squadron emblem (Note: Approved 29 August 2007.)

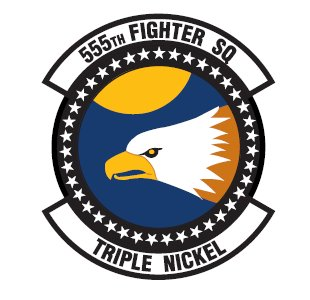
- 555th Tactical Fighter Squadron emblem (Note: Approved 13 March 1975.)

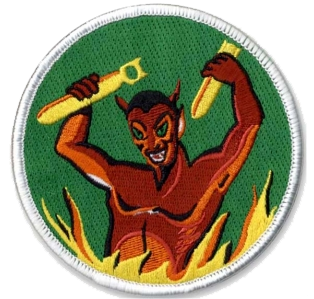
- 555th Bombardment Squadron emblem

The 555th Fighter Squadron is part of the 31st Operations Group at Aviano Air Base, Italy. It operates General Dynamics F-16 Fighting Falcon aircraft conducting multirole air and ground missions.

The squadron was first activated during World War II as the 555th Bombardment Squadron. After training in the United States, it deployed to European Theater of Operations, where it participated in the campaign against Germany. It earned a Distinguished Unit Citation for its missions flown in preparation for the invasion of France. It returned to the United States following V-E Day and was inactivated.

== Mission ==
The 555th Fighter Squadron provides combat airpower on demand to U.S. and NATO Combatant Commanders as well as the National Command Authority in order to meet National Security objectives.

It also performs air and space control and force application roles of counterair, strategic attack and counterland, including interdiction and close-air support, with 26 F-16CM Vipers employing state of the art munitions in support of the joint, NATO, and combined operations.

== History ==
=== World War II ===
The squadron was first activated at MacDill Field, Florida in December 1942 as the 555th Bombardment Squadron, one of the four original squadrons of the 386th Bombardment Group. After training at MacDill and Lake Charles Army Air Field, Louisiana with the Martin B-26 Marauder, it departed for the European Theater of Operations in early May 1943. The ground echelon sailed on the RMS Queen Elizabeth on 27 May, while the air echelon ferried their Marauders to Europe via both the North Atlantic and South Atlantic ferry routes.

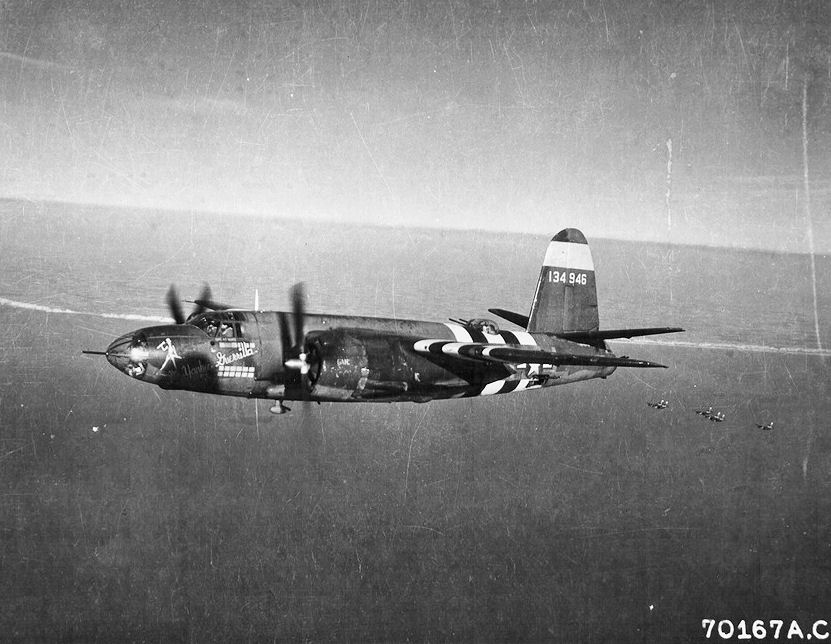
"The Yankee Guerilla" a Martin B-26C of the 555th BS (Note: The Yankee Guerilla was a Martin B-26C-15-MO Marauder, serial 41-34946. On 5 October 1944, returning from a mission in the area of Duren Barracks in Southwestern Germany, the plane crashed into a vacant farm house 5 miles northwest of Compeigne, France.Baugher, Joe (1 April 2023). "1941 USAF Serial Numbers". Joe Baugher. Missing Air Crew Report 15252.)

Upon arrival in England, the squadron was stationed at RAF Snetterton Heath. However, Eighth Air Force had decided to transfer its B-26 units from VIII Bomber Command to VIII Air Support Command and move them to stations closer to the European continent, so a week after its arrival, the squadron moved to RAF Boxted. This move also put the squadron's base in an area where it was planned to locate a future tactical air force. The squadron's entry into combat was delayed by the fact that its training in the United States had concentrated on low level attacks, while Eighth Air Force had determined to use the Marauders in medium level attacks to avoid light flak. This required additional training. Although some diversionary missions were flown, the squadron did not fly its first combat mission, an attack on Woensdrecht Airfield, until 30 July.

During its first month of combat the squadron concentrated on attacks on enemy air bases, although it also attacked gun positions and marshalling yards. In an effort to improve accuracy, the squadron participated in the 386th Group's first use of "drop on leader" tactics and revised formations in the European Theater on 2 September. The following month, the squadron flew its last mission with Eighth Air Force on 8 October when it attacked an airfield near Lille.

Shortly after its transfer to Ninth Air Force, the squadron began participating in an extensive campaign against V-1 flying bomb and V-2 rocket sites in Operation Crossbow. During Big Week, the squadron attacked airfields in Belgium and the Netherlands to weaken enemy air defenses against the heavy bombers striking the German aircraft industry in Operation Pointblank. In preparation for Operation Overlord, the invasion of the continent, it attacked airfields, marshalling yards and gun positions. In late May, just before the landings, it concentrated on bombing bridges across the Seine to interfere with possible enemy reinforcement of the landing areas. On D-Day it hit coastal defenses, and during the fighting in Normandy, struck fuel and supply depots, lines of communication and enemy positions.

The squadron provided air support for Allied forces attacking Caen and on 25 July supported Operation Cobra, the breakout at Saint Lo. For its efforts against enemy opposition since entering combat the previous summer, the squadron was awarded the Distinguished Unit Citation. During August, the squadron supported ground forces closing the Falaise gap to prevent surrounded German forces from escaping. September saw the squadron conducting attacks in the area of Brest.

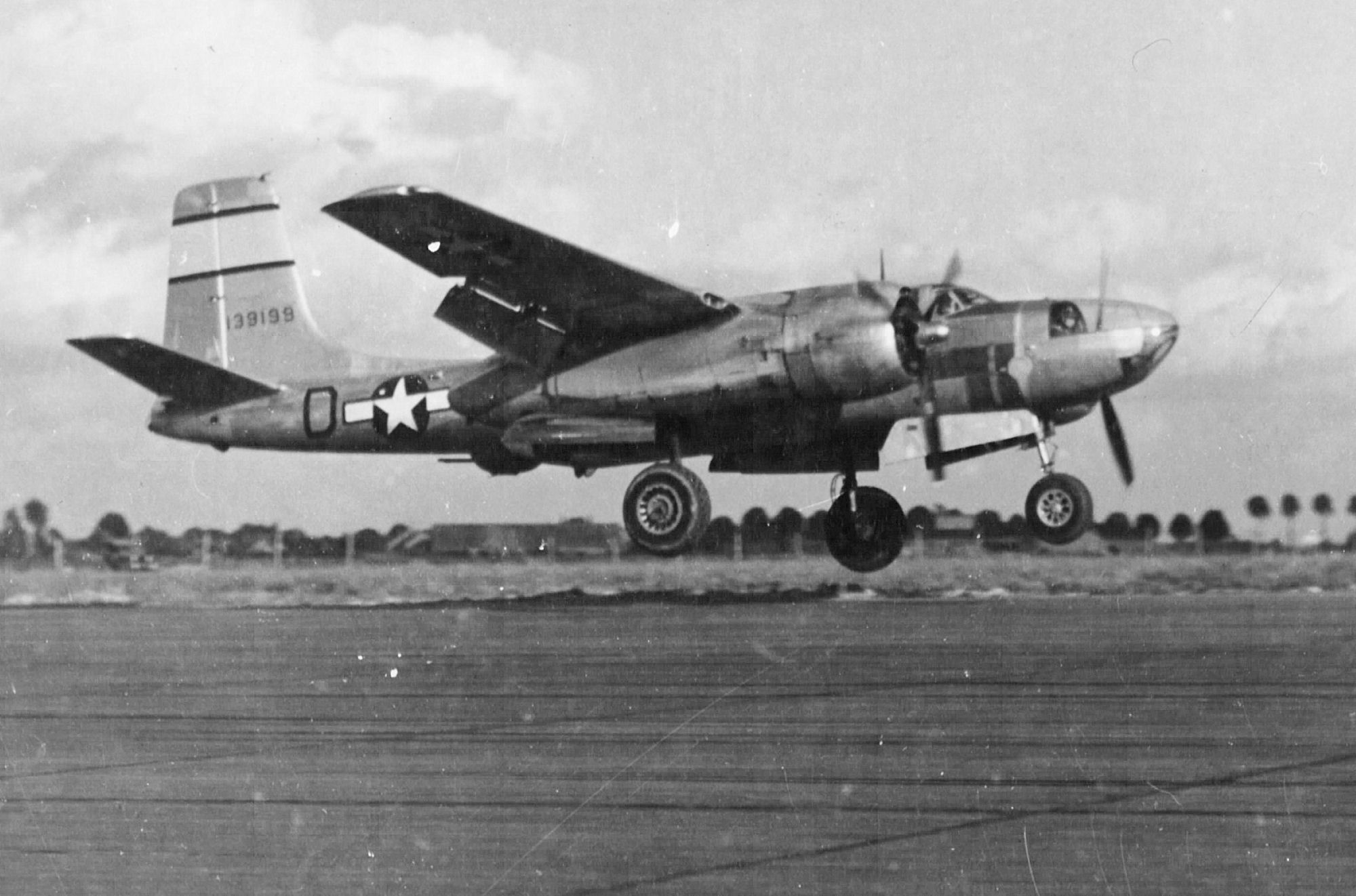
Squadron A-26 Invader at Beaumont-sur-Oise Airfield (Note: Aircraft is Douglas A-26C-2-DL Invader, serial 41-39199.Baugher, Joe (1 April 2023). "1941 USAF Serial Numbers". Joe Baugher. Taken on 2 December 1944.)

In October, the squadron moved to Beaumont-sur-Oise Airfield, an advanced landing ground in France to be closer to allied forces advancing through northern Europe. From its location on the continent, it attacked Metz, targets in the Netherlands, and depots and defended areas in Germany. During the Battle of the Bulge in December 1944 and January 1945, it concentrated on attacks on bridges.

Shortly after the fighting in the Ardennes, the squadron was withdrawn from combat to convert from the Marauder to the Douglas A-26 Invader. It flew missions with its new plane from Sint-Truiden Airfield, Belgium through May 1945. The squadron's last mission was on 3 May, an attack on the Stod Ammunition Plant in Czechoslovakia. After V-E Day the squadron remained in Belgium until July, when it returned to the United States, inactivating at Westover Field, Massachusetts on 7 November 1945.

=== Vietnam Era & Late Cold War Era ===
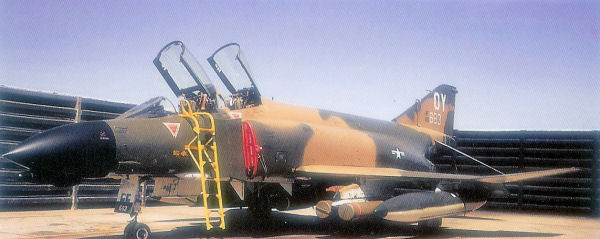
Squadron McDonnell F-4D Phantom II (Note: Aircraft is McDonnell F-4D-28-MC Phantom II, serial 65-0683, circa January 1972. This aircraft was retired to AMARC at Davis-Monthan AFB on 6 May 1988 and scrapped on 2 January 1997.Baugher, Joe (9 February 2023). "1965 USAF Serial Numbers". Joe Baugher.)

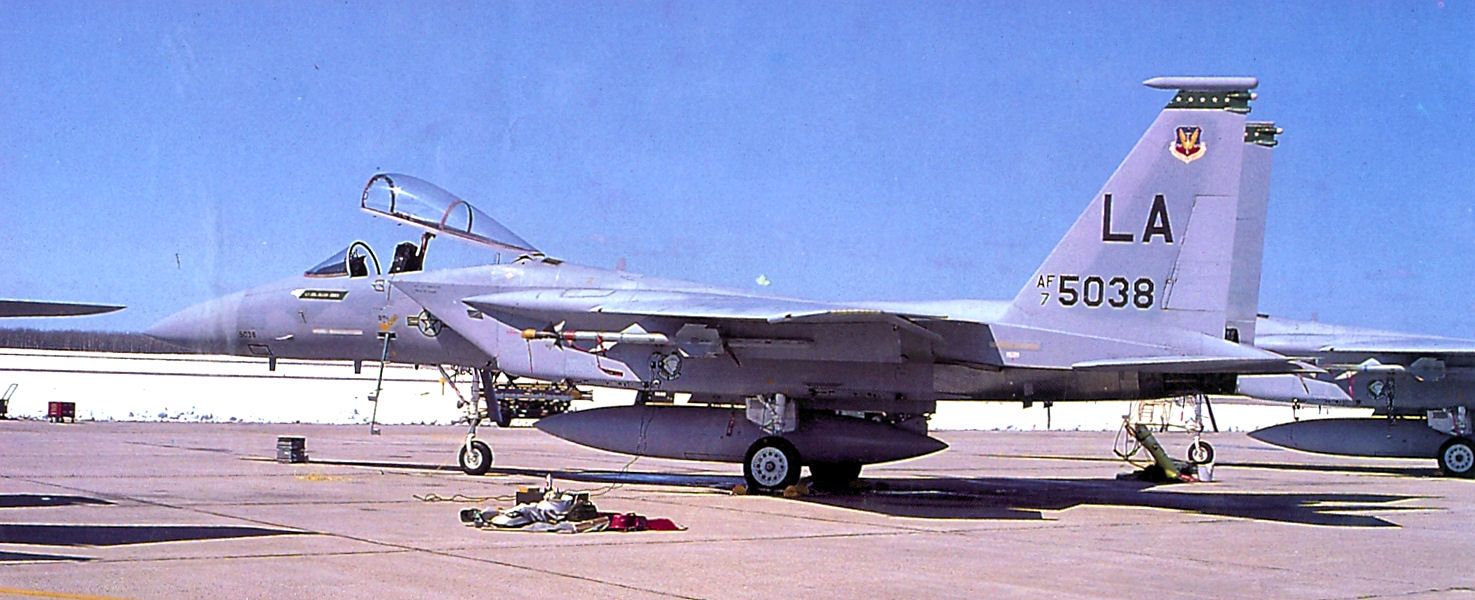
555th TFTS F-15A Eagle (Note: Aircraft is F-15A-13-MC Eagle, serial 75-0038. The plane was sent to AMARC on 15 January 2008 and scrapped on 14 July 2009.Baugher, Joe (9 April 2023). "1975 USAF Serial Numbers". Joe Baugher. Taken 1979.)

On 8 January 1964, the 555th re-emerged at MacDill Air Force Base, Florida as the 555th Tactical Fighter Squadron (555 TFS), operating the McDonnell F-4C Phantom II. The squadron was organized from elements of the 557th, 558th and 559 TFS at MacDill, when the parent 12th Tactical Fighter Wing (12 TFW) reduced the number of aircraft from three squadrons of 25 aircraft each to four squadrons of 18 aircraft.

The conflict in Southeast Asia was escalating and throughout 1965 the wing supported Pacific Air Forces (PACAF) Contingency Operations by rotating combat squadrons quarterly to Naha Air Base, Okinawa, in the Ryukyu Islands. At Naha AB, the squadrons were part of the 51st Fighter Interceptor Wing (51 FIW) and performed as air defense interceptor squadrons for the Ryukyu Islands. The 555th had flown its planes to Naha AB in December 1964 on the first three-month rotation. Later, the 555th was chosen to return to Naha AB and left MacDill AFB on 6 November 1965 via Boeing C-135 Stratolifter transports. The 555th relieved the 559th at Naha and assumed control of its F-4 aircraft and other assets. The 12 TFW was slated to open Cam Ranh Base, South Vietnam (RVN). The air defense mission in Okinawa could not be abandoned and a decision was made to keep the 555th there until a replacement unit could be identified. The remainder of the 12 TFW deployed to Cam Ranh beginning in November 1965.

A Convair F-102 Delta Dagger fighter-interceptor squadron at Travis Air Force Base, California was picked to replace the 555th at Naha. The F-102 was not able to air refuel, so the F-102s were modified to a U.S. Navy and NATO style probe and drogue refueling configuration and the pilots trained to perform air refueling, a new concept for a fighter-interceptor squadron. The F-102s arrived at Naha in late February 1966. A decision was made to send the 555th to Udorn Royal Thai Air Force Base in northeastern Thailand, near Vientiane, Laos, and not to join the other three 12 TFW squadrons at Cam Ranh. Cam Ranh could hold only four F-4C squadrons. 391 TFS had arrived at Cam Ranh awaiting runway construction at Phan Rang Air Base, RVN. Until the 391st rejoined 366 TFW, the 12th could not accommodate the 555th (lack of space). The decision to assign 555th at Udorn was validated in April 1966 when the 555th downed five North Vietnamese Vietnam People's Air Force MiG fighters. A sixth MiG was downed by an F-4C from Danang Air Base, RVN.

Udorn was small and when a squadron of USAF Lockheed F-104A Starfighters was brought there, it was decided to send two flights, half of the 555th, to Ubon Royal Thai Air Force Base. There was not enough billeting for the entire 555th at Ubon and what was available was not adequate for daytime rest. The 8 TFW was the resident unit at Ubon and were flying only night missions (Night Owl) into North Vietnam. During the first two weeks at Ubon, the 555th flew day strikes into North Vietnam. A barracks-type building was hastily constructed to house the entire 555th and the remaining half of the squadron was brought to Ubon in July 1966, at which time the entire squadron began flying Night Owl missions. However, the new building was not air conditioned, so the 555th flew from sunset to about 23:00 hours local time. The two squadrons of the 8 TFW flew the missions from 23:00 to sunrise. Later in 1966, the 555th was transferred from the 12 TFW to the 8 TFW.

The 8 TFW later became known as the "Wolfpack" and the 555th led the first strike against MiG airfields in North Vietnam. The 555 TFS launched night bombing attacks against North Vietnam on 29 September 1967. While at Ubon, the 555th downed additional MiGs, including four Mikoyan-Gurevich MiG-21s on 2 January 1967 in Operation Bolo. The unit thus became the only "Quad Ace" fighter squadron to that point, with 20 MiGs to its credit. In 1968, the 555th participated in the campaign against the Ho Chi Minh Trail and the Linebacker campaigns against the North Vietnam heartland in 1972. During Linebacker I and Linebacker II, the 555th returned to its air superiority role and brought its MiG tally to 39 confirmed victories with ten MiG-17s, three MiG-19s, and 26 MiG-21s, producing the first and second USAF aces, and earning the motto, "World's Largest Distributor of MiG Parts". From 1966 to 1973, the 555th earned three more Presidential Unit Citations, five Air Force Outstanding Unit Awards with Combat "V" device, the Republic of Vietnam Gallantry Cross with palm, and the 1973 Hughes achievement award.

After nine years of combat operations, the 555th returned to the United States. In 1974, the squadron moved to Luke Air Force Base, Arizona, where it transitioned to the McDonnell Douglas F-15 Eagle and became part of the 405th Tactical Training Wing, training pilots transitioning to the F-15 Eagle.

The squadron was redesignated the 555th Fighter Squadron (555 FS) on 1 November 1991 and inactivated on 25 March 1994.

=== Reactivation in Italy ===
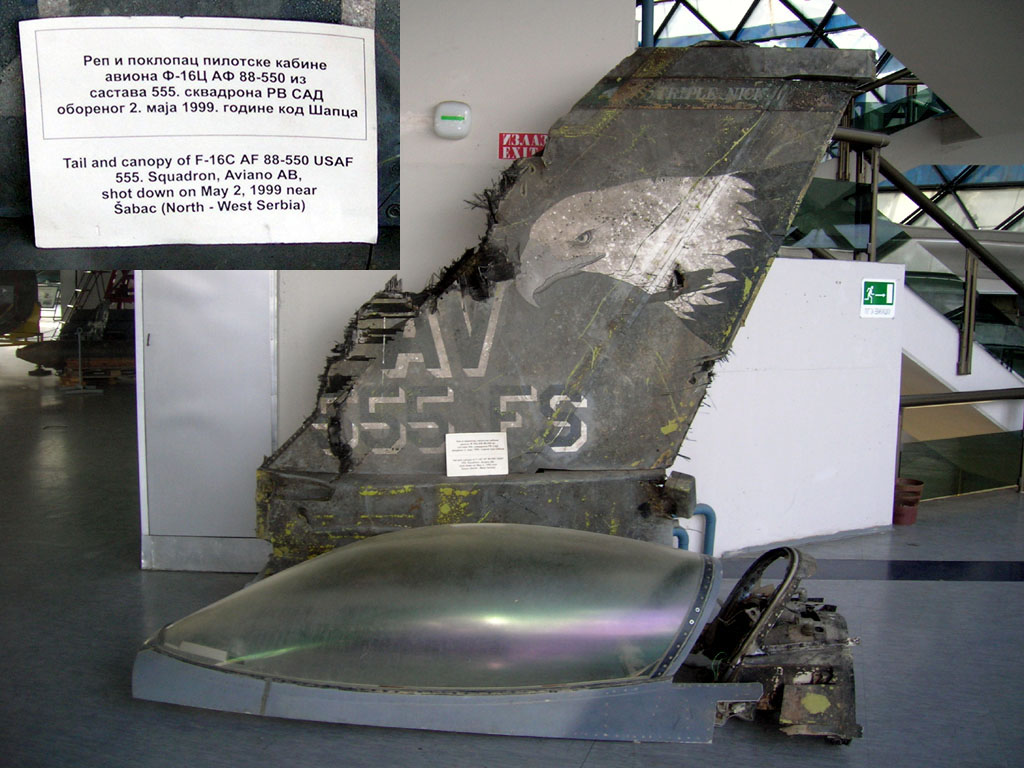
Tail and canopy of then commander Goldfein's F-16CG, shot down during Operation Allied Force, at the Museum of Aviation, Belgrade

On 1 April 1994, the unit was reactivated and reassigned to U.S. Air Forces in Europe (USAFE) and NATO and stationed at Aviano Air Base, Italy, absorbing the General Dynamics F-16 Fighting Falcon and equipment of the inactivated 526th Fighter Squadron, which had been inactivated at Ramstein Air Base, Germany when the 86 FW became an airlift wing (86 AW) following the inactivation of the 435th Airlift Wing and the downsizing of its former installation, Rhein-Main Air Base, Germany. At Aviano, the squadron returned to its previous mission as an operational combat fighter squadron.

==== 2013 Sequestration ====
Air Combat Command (ACC) officials announced a stand down and reallocation of flying hours for the rest of the fiscal year 2013 due to mandatory budget cuts. This also impacted USAF tactical flying units in USAFE, PACAF, the Air Force Reserve Command and the Air National Guard. The across-the board spending cuts, called sequestration, took effect 1 March 2013 when Congress failed to agree on a deficit-reduction plan.

Squadrons either stood down on a rotating basis or kept combat ready or at a reduced readiness level called "basic mission capable" for part or all of the remaining months in fiscal year 2013. This affected the 555th Fighter Squadron with a stand-down grounding from 9 April to 30 September 2013.

=== Operations ===
- World War II
- Vietnam War
- Operation Deny Flight
- Operation Deliberate Force
- Operation Deliberate Guard
- Operation Allied Force
- Operation Northern Watch
- Operation Southern Watch
- Operation Enduring Freedom
- Operation Iraqi Freedom
- Operation Freedom's Sentinel
- Operation Inherent Resolve

== Lineage ==
- Constituted as the 555th Bombardment Squadron (Medium) on 25 November 1942

Activated on 1 December 1942
Redesignated 555th Bombardment Squadron, Medium on 9 October 1944
Redesignated 555th Bombardment Squadron, Light on 23 June 1945
Inactivated on 7 November 1945

- Redesignated 555th Tactical Fighter Squadron, activated and organized on 8 January 1964

Redesignated 555th Tactical Fighter Training Squadron on 5 July 1974
Redesignated 555th Fighter Squadron on 1 November 1991
Inactivated on 25 March 1994

- Activated on 1 April 1994

=== Assignments ===
- 386th Bombardment Group, 1 December 1942 – 7 November 1945
- 12th Tactical Fighter Wing, 8 January 1964 (attached to 51st Fighter Interceptor Wing, 12 December 1964 – 9 March 1965, 11 December 1965 – 21 February 1966, 8th Tactical Fighter Wing, c. after 22 February 1966)
- Thirteenth Air Force, 4 March 1966 (attached to 8th Tactical Fighter Wing until 24 March 1966)
- 8th Tactical Fighter Wing, 25 March 1966
- 432d Tactical Reconnaissance Wing, 1 June 1968
- 58th Tactical Fighter Training Wing (later 58 Tactical Training Wing), 5 July 1974
- 405th Tactical Training Wing, 29 August 1979
- 58th Operations Group, 1 October 1991 – 25 March 1994
- 31st Operations Group, 1 April 1994 – present

=== Stations ===
- MacDill Field, Florida, 1 December 1942
- Lake Charles Army Air Field, Louisiana, 9 February – 8 May 1943
- RAF Snetterton Heath (AAF-138), England, 4 June 1943
- RAF Boxted (AAF-150), England, 10 June 1943
- RAF Great Dunmow (AAF-164), England, 24 September 1943
- Beaumont-sur-Oise Airfield (A-60), France, 2 October 1944
- Sint-Truiden Airfield (A-92), Belgium, 9 April – 27 July 1945
- Seymour Johnson Field, North Carolina, 11 August 1945
- Westover Field, Massachusetts, 29 September – 7 November 1945
- MacDill Air Force Base, Florida, 8 January 1964 (deployed to Naha Air Base, Okinawa, 12 December 1964 – 9 March 1965 and 11 December 1965 – c. 21 February 1966
- Udorn Royal Thai Air Force Base, Thailand, c. 25 February 1966
- Ubon Royal Thai Air Force Base, Thailand, 20 July 1966
- Udorn Royal Thai Air Force Base, Thailand, 28 May 1968 – 5 July 1974
- Luke Air Force Base, Arizona, 5 July 1974 – 25 March 1994
- Aviano Air Base, Italy, 1 April 1994 – present

=== Aircraft ===
- Martin B-26 Marauder (1943–1945)
- Douglas A-26 Invader (1945)
- McDonnell Douglas F-4 Phantom II (1964–1974)
- McDonnell Douglas F-15 Eagle (1974–1994)
- F-16C/D Block 40 Fighting Falcon (1994 – present)
