= Buđanovci =

Buđanovci Буђановци (Serbian)
- Village (Selo)
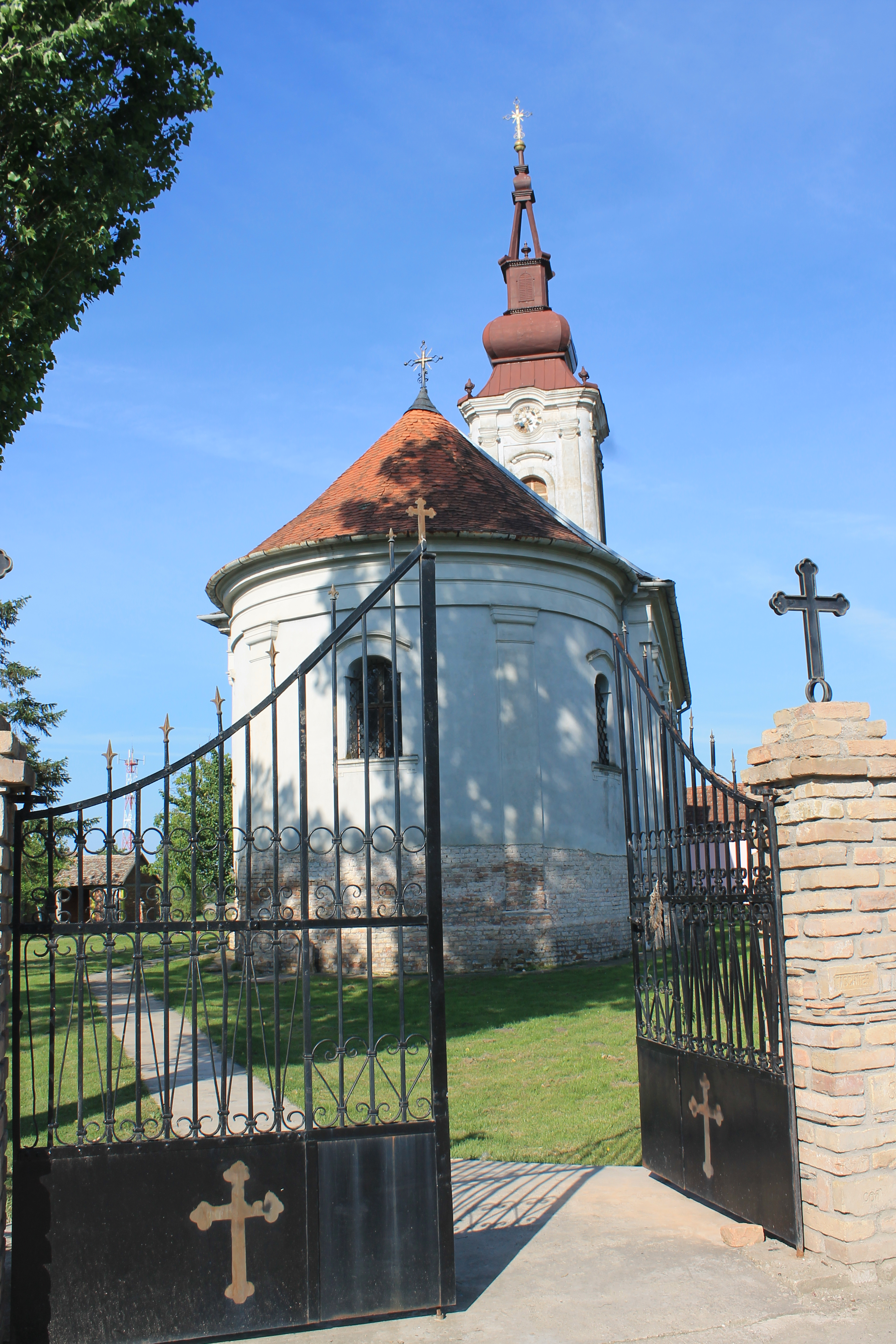

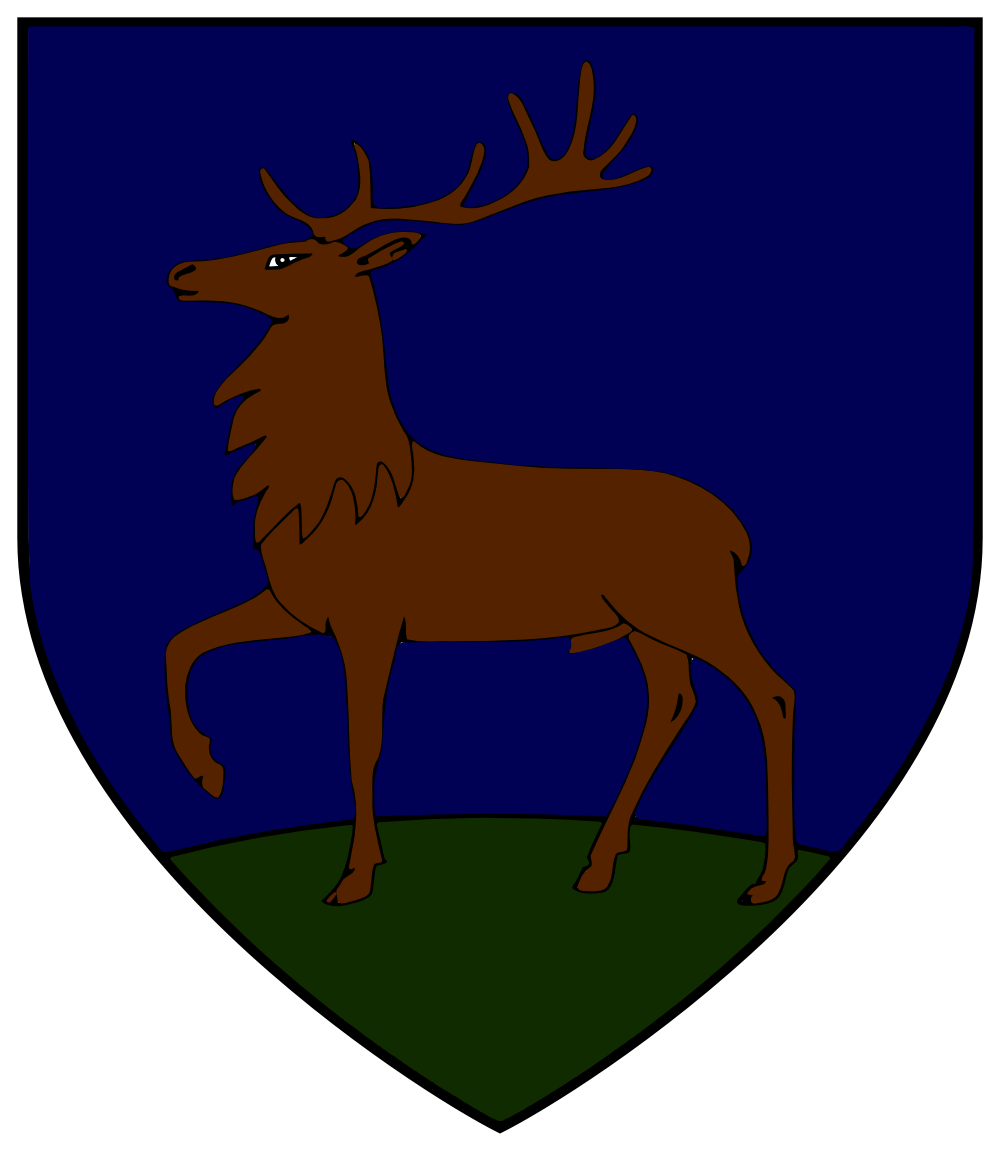
- Seal

- Location within Vojvodina Location within Serbia Location within Europe
- Coordinates: 44°54′N 19°52′E
- Country: Serbia
- Province: Vojvodina
- Region: Syrmia
- District: Srem
- Municipality: Ruma

Population (2022)
  - Total: 1,244
- Time zone: UTC+1 (CET)
  - Summer (DST): UTC+2 (CEST)

Buđanovci (Serbian Cyrillic: Буђановци) is a village in Serbia. It is situated in the municipality of Ruma, Srem District, Vojvodina province. The village has a Serb ethnic majority and its population numbering 1,244 residents (2022 census).

== History ==
The village received a brief worldwide fame when the Yugoslav army shot down a NATO F-117A stealth bomber near the village during the 1999 NATO bombing of Yugoslavia.

== Historical population ==
Population of the village in various censuses:

- 1961: 2,392
- 1971: 2,260
- 1981: 1,991
- 1991: 1,848
- 2002: 1,757
- 2011: 1,496
- 2022: 1,224

== See also ==
- List of places in Serbia
- List of cities, towns and villages in Vojvodina
