= Paul Horn (computer scientist) =

American computer scientist

Paul M. Horn
- Born: August 16, 1946 (age 80); New York, New York
- Education: Clarkson University, BS; University of Rochester, PhD
- Scientific career
- Fields: Computer Science
- Workplaces: New York University, IBM

Paul M. Horn (born August 16, 1946) is an American computer scientist and solid state physicist who has made contributions to pervasive computing, pioneered the use of copper and self-assembly in chip manufacturing, and he helped manage the development of deep computing, an important tool that provides business decision makers with the ability to analyze and develop solutions to very complex and difficult problems.

Horn was elected a member of the National Academy of Engineering in 2007 for leadership in the development of information technology products, ranging from microelectronics to supercomputing.

== Early life and education ==
Horn was born on August 16, 1946, and graduated from Clarkson University in 1968 with a Bachelor of Science degree. He obtained his PhD from the University of Rochester in physics in 1973.

== Career ==
Horn has, at various times, been Senior Vice President of the IBM Corporation and executive director of Research. While at IBM, he initiated the project to develop Watson, the computer that competed successfully in the quiz show Jeopardy!.

He is currently a New York University (NYU) Distinguished Scientist in Residence and NYU Stern Executive in Residence. He is also a professor at NYU Tandon School of Engineering. In 2009, he was appointed as the Senior Vice Provost for Research at NYU.

== Awards ==
- Industrial Research Institute (IRI) Medal in honor of his contributions to technology leadership, 2005
- American Physical Society, George E. Pake Prize, 2002
- Hutchison Medal from the University of Rochester, 2002
- Distinguished Leadership award from the New York Hall of Science, 2000
- Bertram Eugene Warren Award from the American Crystallographic Association, 1988
