= List of aircraft shootdowns =

This is a list of aircraft shootdowns, dogfights and other incidents during wars since World War II. An aircraft shootdown occurs when an aircraft is struck by a projectile launched or fired from another aircraft or from the ground (anti-aircraft warfare) which causes the targeted aircraft to lose its ability to continue flying normally, and then subsequently crashing into land or sea, often resulting in severe injury or death of the occupants on board. This list does not cover aircraft destroyed during the Korean War, the Vietnam War, or Gulf War.

== Military aircraft ==
=== Cold War (1945–1991) ===
- 9 August 1946 – A USAAF Douglas C-47 Skytrain was shot down by two Yugoslav Yakovlev Yak-3s over Slovenia, northern Yugoslavia and crash landed. All crew and passengers survived.
- 19 August 1946 – A USAAF Douglas C-47 Skytrain was shot down by a Yugoslav Yakovlev Yak-3 over Slovenia, northern Yugoslavia. All five crew killed.
- 9 February 1948 – Two Turkish Supermarine Spitfires were shot down by Bulgarian small arms fire.
- 27 October 1948 – An Italian Lockheed P-38 Lightning was shot down over Yugoslavia.
- 8 April 1950 – A US Navy PB4Y-2 Privateer of VP-26 which had departed from Wiesbaden, West Germany was shot down during a patrol mission over the Baltic by four Soviet Air Force La-11 "Fangs" off of Liepāja, Latvia.
- 9 August 1950 – A PLAAF Tu-2 "Bat" was shot down near Shanghai by a Soviet pilot that mistook it for a B-25 Mitchell.
- 4 September 1950 – A US Navy F4U-4B Corsair from the carrier USS Valley Forge shot down a Soviet Naval Aviation Douglas A-20 over the Yellow Sea, southeast of Port Arthur Naval Base.
- 4 December 1950 – A USAF RB-45C Tornado was shot down by a Soviet Air Force MiG-15 "Fagot" east of Andong, China.
- 26 December 1950 – A USAF RB-29 Superfortress was shot down by two Soviet Air Force MiG-15 "Fagots".
- 13 October 1951 – An Italian Lockheed P-38 Lightning was shot down over Yugoslavia.
- 6 November 1951 – A US Navy P2V-3W Neptune of VP-6 was shot down by a Soviet Air Force La-11 "Fang" over the Sea of Japan near Vladivostok.
- 13 June 1952 – A USAF RB-29 Superfortress was shot down by Soviet Air Force MiG-15 "Fagots" over the Sea of Japan near Soviet coastline.
- Catalina affair (13 June 1952)
- 7 October 1952 – A USAF RB-29 Superfortress was shot down by two Soviet Air Force La-11 "Fangs" over the Kuril Islands.
- 29 November 1952 – A Civil Air Transport C-47 Skytrain operated by CIA was shot down over Jilin Province, China.
- Air battle over Merklín (10 March 1953)
- Avro Lincoln shootdown incident (12 March 1953)
- 27 January 1954 – An engagement over the Yellow Sea between eight Chinese PLAAF MiG-15 "Fagots" and a flight of USAF F-86 Sabres escorting an RB-45 Tornado ended in the downing of one of the attacking MiG-15 by first lieutenant Bertram Beecroft.
- 26 July 1954 – Off Hainan island two PLAAF La-11 "Fangs" attacked two USN AD-4 Skyraiders from VF-54 launched off the USS Philippine Sea (CV 47) while they were searching for survivors of the Cathay Pacific DC-4 shot down by the PLAAF four days earlier. Under attack, pilots William Alexander and John Zarious were soon aided by more AD-4 Skyraiders of their own squadron as well as one F4U-5N of VC-3. One Lavochkin was downed by two AD-4 piloted by Roy Tatham and Richard Cooks, the other by F4U pilot Edgar Salsig and AD-4 pilots John Damien, John Rochford, Paul Wahlstrom and Richard Ribble.
- 5 February 1955 – 60 km west of Pyongyang over the Yellow Sea an RB-45 Tornado of the 91st Strategic reconnaissance squadron escorted by eight USAF F-86 Sabres found themselves under attack by twelve KPAF MiG-15 "Fagots", the engagement resulted in the downing of two of the attacking Mikoyan by Sabre pilots Charles Salmon and George Williams.
- 17 April 1955 – A USAF RB-47E Stratojet of the 4th Strategic Reconnaissance Squadron took off from Eielson AFB and was later shot down off Kamchatka by two Soviet MiG-15 "Fagots" flown by Korotkov and Sazhinwith. All crew of Lacie C. Neighbors, Robert N. Brooks and Richard E. Watkins Jr were reported missing presumed dead.
- 10 May 1955 – Over the Yellow Sea eighty kilometers southwest of Sinuiju a group of eight USAF F-86 Sabres finds itself under attack by twelve PLAAF MiG-15 "Fagots", pilot Xizhong Ni claims the downing of one Sabre. USAF pilots Robert Fulton and Burt Phythyon each claim to have downed a MiG themselves.
- 18 August 1955 – After accidentally flying above the Korean Demilitarized Zone, a USAF LT-6 Texan Trainer was downed by North Korean ground fire killing the pilot and observer on board.
- 1 September 1955 – Two Egyptian de Havilland Vampires were shot down by an Israeli Gloster Meteor.
- 12 April 1956 – An Egyptian de Havilland Vampire was shot down by an Israeli Dassault Ouragan.
- 23 June 1956 – A ROCAF RB-17G Flying Fortress of the Air Force Special Mission Group, flown by Yeh Cheng-min, was shot down by PLAAF MiG-17 "Fresco" over Jiangxi Province, China, killing all 11 crew members onboard.
- 10 April 1959 – 1959 Canberra shootdown
- 1 May 1960 – U-2 shootdown incident
- 26 August 1960 – An Indian Air Force Dakota DC-3 registered HJ233 trying to drop relief materials and ammunitions to a besieged post was shot down by the Naga Army. All on board were captured alive and were later released unharmed.
- 4 March 1961 – A Cuban Liberation Air Force Beechcraft AT-11 Kansan was shot down by a Cuban Revolutionary Air Force Lockheed T-33 over the sea. All crew recovered by friendly ship.
- (2) 16 August 1962 – two Turkish Air Force F-84F Thunderstreaks shot down two Iraqi Air Force Il-28 "Beagle" bombers that crossed the Turkish border by mistake during a bombing operation against Iraqi Kurdish insurgents.
- 27 October 1962 – in the morning, a U-2F (the third CIA U-2A, modified for air-to-air refueling) piloted by USAF Major Rudolf Anderson, departed its forward operating location at McCoy AFB, Florida. At approximately 12:00 pm EDT, the aircraft was struck by a S-75 Dvina (NATO designation SA-2 Guideline) surface-to-air missile launched from Cuba. The aircraft was shot down, and Anderson was killed.
- 17 May 1963 – A US Army OH-23 Raven helicopter was shot down over the Korean DMZ.
- 28 January 1964 – 1964 T-39 shootdown incident
- 15 April 1969 – 1969 EC-121 shootdown incident
- 28 November 1973 – Soviet MiG-21 pilot Captain Gennadii N. Eliseev was killed after ramming an IIAF RF-4C intruding into Soviet airspace on behalf of CIA Project Dark Gene. The Iranian aircraft was flown by IIAF Major Shokouhnia, and USAF Colonel John Saunders was in the rear seat. Both ejected and were captured by Soviet authorities.
- 16 July 1975 – 1975 An-2 shootdown incident
- (2) 21 June 1978 – 1978 Iranian Chinook shootdown
- 14 September 1983 – a pair of Turkish Air Force F-100F Super Sabre fighter jets of 182 Filo "Atmaca" penetrated Iraqi airspace. A Mirage F-1EQ of the Iraqi Air Force intercepted the flight and fired a Super 530F-1 missile at them. One of the Turkish fighter jets (s/n 56-3903) was shot down and crashed in Zakho valley near the Turkish-Iraqi border. The plane's pilots reportedly survived the crash and were returned to Turkey. The incident was not made public by either side, although some details surfaced in later years. The incident was revealed in 2012 by Turkish Defence Minister İsmet Yılmaz, in response to a parliamentary question by Republican People's Party (CHP) MP Metin Lütfi Baydar in the aftermath of the downing of a Turkish F-4 Phantom II in Syria, in 2012.
- 25 May 1982 – 1982 Royal Air Force Jaguar shootdown incident
- (2) In 1988, Soviet MiG-23MLDs using R-23s downed two Iranian AH-1J Cobras that had intruded into Afghan airspace.
- 21 October 1989 – a Turkish land registry BN-2 Islander photographic mapping plane was shot down by a Syrian Air Force MiG-21bis, piloted by Hussam Mezien. All four on board died in the crash.

=== Indonesian National Revolution (1945–1949) ===
- 17 December 1945 – An RAF Republic Thunderbolt Mk II was shot down by anti-aircraft fire during a tactical reconnaissance over Surabaya, East Java. The pilot bailed out and captured by Indonesian authorities.
- 4 May 1946 – An ML-KNIL Curtiss P-40 Warhawk was hit by anti-aircraft fire and crash landed in Surabaya, East Java.
- 14 May 1947 – An MLD Fairey Firefly was shot down by anti-aircraft fire during a reconnaissance over Mount Anjasmoro, East Java. The pilot was killed and the observer was captured by Indonesian forces.
- 21 July 1947 – An MLD Fairey Firefly was hit by ground fire during a close air support mission and crash landed in Pasuruan, East Java. The pilot was killed.
- 21 July 1947 – An ML-KNIL North American B-25 Mitchell was shot down by ground fire over Palembang, South Sumatra, killing all five crew.
- 23 July 1947 – An ML-KNIL Curtiss P-40 Warhawk was hit by anti-aircraft fire over Maguwo and crash landed near Boyolali, Central Java. The pilot was killed.
- 4 August 1947 – An MLD Fairey Firefly was shot down by anti-aircraft fire over Madura near Surabaya, East Java. The pilot was killed.
- 22 December 1948 – An ML-KNIL Curtiss P-40 Warhawk was shot down by ground fire over Magelang, Central Java. The pilot was killed.
- 26 January 1949 – An RNLAF Taylorcraft Auster was shot down by ground fire during a reconnaissance over Tasikmalaya, West Java, killing all two crew.

=== Greek Civil War (1946-1949) ===
- 10 May 1948 – A North American T-6 Texan from the Royal Hellenic Air Force was shot down by ground fire over Grevena Province. Both crew killed.
- 22 January 1949 – A USAF North American T-6 Texan was shot down by Communist guerrillas over Greece killing the pilot.

=== Internal conflict in Myanmar (1948–present) ===
- 20 January 1949 – A Burmese Air Force Auster AOP.5 was shot down by insurgents in Pantanaw, killing two.
- 15 April 1953 – A Burmese Air Force Douglas C-47 was shot down by ROC Army in Burma, killing twelve.
- 20 September 1958 – A Burmese Air Force Hawker Sea Fury was shot down by Karen rebels during ground attack mission near Papun, pilot killed.
- 15 February 1961 – A ROCAF PB4Y-2 Privateer carrying supplies for the ROC Army in Burma was shot down by a Burmese Air Force Hawker Sea Fury near Mae Sai, Thailand near the border with Burma.
- date unknown, 1978 – A Burmese Air Force de Havilland Vampire was shot down by rebels during ground attack mission in northern Burma.
- 29 August 1997 – A Royal Thai Army Bell 206B-3 JetRanger either crashed or was shot down by Myanmar Army within a small Myanmar territory which juts into Thailand, south of the Thai city of Mae Sot, six killed.
- 4 January 2012 – A Myanmar Air Force Mi-2 was shot down by Kachin Independence Army rebels and crashed at a paddy field in Momauk Township, pilot killed.
- 11 January 2013 – A Mi-35P either crashed or was shot down by Kachin Independence Army rebels south of Myitkyina, killing three.
- 3 May 2021 – A Myanmar Air Force Mi-35 was shot down by the Kachin Independence Army in Momauk Township, hit by a MANPADS during air raids involving attack helicopters and fighter jets. A video emerged showing the helicopter being hit while flying over a village.
- 13 February 2023 – A Myanmar Air Force Mi-17 was shot down by People's Defence Force rebels in Homalin Township.
- 30 June 2023 – A Myanmar Air Force Hongdu K-8 was shot down by Karenni National People's Liberation Front rebels in Bawlakhe Township, two killed.
- 11 November 2023 – A Myanmar Air Force Hongdu K-8 either crashed or was shot down by Karenni Nationalities Defence Force rebels in Hpruso Township.

=== First Arab–Israeli War (1948–1949) ===
- 15 May 1948 – An Egyptian Supermarine Spitfire was shot down by anti-aircraft fire over Sde Dov Airport.
- (6) 22 May 1948 – An RAF Douglas Dakota was intercepted and shot down by an Egyptian Spitfire. Four Egyptian Supermarine Spitfires were shot down by RAF Spitfires over Ramat David Airbase. Another Egyptian Spitfire was shot down by anti-aircraft fire.
- 29 May 1948 – An Israeli Avia S-199 was shot down during close air support over Isdud. The pilot was killed.
- 30 May 1948 – An Israeli Avia S-199 was shot down during close air support east of Netanya. The pilot bailed over friendly territory.
- (2) 3 June 1948 – Two Egyptian Douglas C-47 Dakota bombers were shot down by an Israeli Avia S-199 while attempting to bomb Tel Aviv.
- 4 June 1948 – An Israeli Fairchild Argus was shot down by an Egyptian Spitfire during a bombing run against Egyptian ships southwest of Tel Aviv. Another source mentioned that it was shot down by a Hawker Sea Fury instead.
- 7 June 1948 – An Israeli Taylorcraft Auster was shot down by an Egyptian Hawker Sea Fury.
- 8 June 1948 – An Egyptian Supermarine Spitfire was shot down by an Israeli Avia S-199 to the south of Tel Aviv.
- 9 July 1948 – An Egyptian Westland Lysander was attacked by an Israeli Avia S-199. The Lysander performed a maneuver kill that resulted in the latter crashing.
- (2) 10 July 1948 – Two Israeli Avia S-199s intercepted two Syrian North American Harvards in the north of the country. Each sides losing a single aircraft to the others.
- 18 July 1948 – An Egyptian Supermarine Spitfire was shot down by an Israeli Avia S-199. The pilot was killed.
- (3) 16 October 1948 – An Egyptian Supermarine Spitfire was shot down by an Israeli Avia S-199. In turn the Egyptian Spitfires managed to shot down two Israeli S-199s.
- 21 October 1948 – An Egyptian Supermarine Spitfire was shot down by an Israeli Spitfire.
- 4 November 1948 – An Egyptian Douglas C-47 Dakota was shot down by two Israeli North American P-51 Mustangs and crash landed at El Arish airbase.
- 17 November 1948 – An Egyptian Supermarine Spitfire was shot down by an Israeli Spitfire over Al-Faluja.
- 20 November 1948 – An RAF de Havilland Mosquito was shot down by an Israeli North American P-51 Mustang and crashed into the Mediterranean Sea.
- 28 December 1948 – An Israeli Piper Cub was shot down by an Egyptian Spitfire near Auja al-Hafir.
- 30 December 1948 – An Egyptian Macchi C.205 Veltro was shot down by an Israeli Spitfire.
- 31 December 1948 – An Egyptian Macchi C.205 Veltro was shot down by an Israeli Spitfire over Bir Hama airbase.
- 4 January 1949 – An Egyptian Macchi C.205 Veltro was shot down by an Israeli Spitfire over Rafah.
- 5 January 1949 – An Egyptian Macchi C.205 Veltro was shot down by an Israeli Spitfire.
- 7 January 1949 – An Egyptian Macchi C.205 Veltro was shot down by an Israeli North American P-51 Mustang over Deir al-Balah.
- (5) 7 January 1949 – Four RAF Supermarine Spitfire flying a recon mission flew over an Israeli troop convoy that were recently attacked by Egyptian aircraft. An RAF Spitfire was shot down by convoy's anti-aircraft fire. Two Israeli Spitfires were over the area and shot down the remaining RAF Spitfires. Later that day, the RAF sent four Spitfires and fifteen Hawker Tempests to look for the missing Spitfires. The 19 RAF fighters was attacked by four Israeli Spitfires, resulting in an RAF Tempest shot down by the Israelis.

=== Insurgency in Balochistan (1948–present) ===
- 3 August 2022 – Balochistan separatists of the BRA claimed to have shot down a military helicopter with an anti-aircraft weapon, killing six.

=== Darul Islam rebellion (1949–1962) ===
- 16 September 1961 – An Indonesian Air Force North American P-51 Mustang was shot down by ground fire over Garut, West Java. The pilot was killed.

=== Taiwan Straits Conflicts (1950–1967) ===
- 14 March 1950 – A RoCAF North American B-25 Mitchell was shot down by PLAAF aircraft, killing six.
- 16 March 1950 – A RoCAF North American P-51 Mustang was shot down by PLA ground fire, killing its pilot.
- 2 April 1950 – A RoCAF North American P-51 Mustang was shot down by Soviet aircraft near Shanghai, killing the pilot.
- 29 July 1950 – A RoCAF P-47N Thunderbolt was shot down by anti-air fire from Xiamen, killing its pilot.
- 16 June 1953 – A RoCAF P-47N Thunderbolt was shot down by anti-aircraft fire from Dongshan Island, killing its pilot.
- 17 December 1953 – A RoCAF P-47N Thunderbolt was shot down by anti-aircraft fire from Jejiang, killing its pilot.
- 22 May 1954 – In an engagement involving six PLAAF MiG-15 "Fagots", RoCAF pilots Chien and Yen shoot down one of the MiGs with machine gun fire from their P-47N Thunderbolts.
- 26 May 1954 – A RoCAF B-17 Flying Fortress was shot down by anti-aircraft fire from Fujian, with all of its four crewmen killed.
- 3 June 1954 – A RoCAF P-47N Thunderbolt was shot down by a La-11 "Fang" of the PLAAF, killing its pilot.
- 6 July 1954 – A RoCAF P-47N Thunderbolt was shot down by cannon fire from a MiG-15 "Fagot" of the PLAAF, killing its pilot.
- 12 September 1954 – A RoCAF PB4Y Privateer was shot down by anti-aircraft fire from Xiamen, killing all nine crew.
- 19 January 1955 – A RoCAF F-84G Thunderjet was shot down by anti-air fire over the PRC, killing its pilot.
- 21 January 1955 –A RoCAF P-47N Thunderbolt was shot down by anti-air fire over the PRC, killing its pilot.
- 9 February 1955 – During the evacuation of nationalist Chinese from the Tachen islands covered by aircraft launched from USS Wasp (CV-18), a USN AD-5W Skyraider of VAW-11 on antisubmarine patrol duty is heavily damaged by PRC Anti-aircraft fire and forced to ditch at sea, the crew of three were rescued by patrol boats of the ROC.
- 22 June 1955 – A RoCAF RT-33A was shot down by a MiG-17 "Fresco" of the PLAAF, killing its pilot.
- 4 July 1955 – A MiG-15 "Fagot", part of a group of four PLAAF MiGs was shotdown in combat with four F-84G Thunderjets of the RoCAF.
- 16 July 1955 – A RoCAF F-84G Thunderjet was shotdown by anti-aircraft fire from Kinmen, killing its pilot.
- 15 October 1955 – A PLAAF MiG-15 "Fagot" was shotdown by Tzu-Wan Sun of the RoCAF using an F-86 Sabre.
- 14 April 1956 – A MiG-15 "Fagot", part of a group of four PLAAF MiGs was shotdown in combat with four F-84G Thunderjets of the RoCAF.
- 22 June 1956 – A RoCAF B-17 Flying Fortress was shotdown during a nighttime mission by cannon fire from an intercepting MiG-17 "Fresco" of the PLAAF. All eleven crew on board were killed.
- 20 July 1956 – A MiG-15 "Fagot" among a group of four PLAAF Mikoyan was shotdown in combat with four F-84G Thunderjets of the RoCAF.
- (2) 21 July 1956 – Two MiG-17 "Frescos", part of a group of four PLAAF MiGs were shot down by pilot I-Fang Ouyang flying as part of a group of four RoCAF F-84G Thunderjets.
- 10 November 1956 – During an airdrop over Jejigxi, a C-46 Commando of the RoCAF was shotdown by a PLAAF MiG-19 "Farmer" killing its nine crewmen.
- 1 July 1957 – A RoCAF P-47N Thunderbolt was shotdown by anti-aircraft fire over the PRC, killing its pilot.
- 18 February 1958 – A RoCAF RB-57D was shot down by a MiG-15 "Fagot" of the PLANAF above Shandong, killing the pilot.
- (2) 29 July 1958 – Two RoCAF F-84G Thunderjets were shot down after four MiG-17 "Frescos" engaged them near Nan Ao Island.
- (3) 14 August 1958 – Three PLAAF MiG-17 "Frescos" were shot down by a group of four RoCAF F-86 Sabres, With pilots Ping-Chun Chin and Chung-Li Li each shooting down one themselves. A third MiG being brought down by two other Sabres flown by Hsien-Wu Liu and Fu-The Pan. Sabre No. 307 involved in the shootdown failed to return to base.
- (2) 25 August 1958 – Two PLAAF MiG-17 "Frescos" were engaged and shot down by RoCAF F-86 Sabres piloted by Tien-En Chiang and Hsu-Hsiang Ku
- 1 / 7 (8) 8 September 1958 – Seven PLAAF MiG-17 "Frescos" were shot down by numerous F-86 Sabres of the RoCAF. Five pilots, Ping-Chun Chin, Yi-Chien Li, Chin-Chung Liang, Chung-Tsi Yu and Wai-Ming Chu each being credited one kill, Hsien-Wu Liu being credited with two. On the PLAAF side pilot Zhang Yi destroys one F-86 Sabre in his MiG-17 "Fresco"
- 1 /6 (7) 18 September 1958 – Above Haicheng Guangdong Six PLAAF MiG-17 "Frescos" were shot down by a number of RoCAF F-86 Sabres flown by Wan-Li Lin, Yang-Chung Lu, Che-Shing Mao, Tzu-Wan Sun, Kuang-Hsing Tung and Hsin-Yeh Liu with each downing one Mikoyan. One Sabre is brought down by cannon fire from a PLAAF MiG-17 "Fresco" piloted by Chang Zhu You.
- (11) 24 September 1958 – Shortly after their aircraft had been retrofitted by technicians of the United States Marine Corps to carry the AIM-9B Sidewinder air to air missile, Numerous missile-armed RoCAF F-86 Sabres took off and gave chase to a group of PLAAF MiG-17 "Frescos" that had cruised above them. Due to the superior rate of climb, vertical maneuverability, thrust to weight ratio and service ceiling of the MiG-17 the Fresco pilots did not perceive any danger in doing this, as they were unaware of the newly installed armament. Sabre pilots began to fire their missiles at the MiGs, destroying some. Others broke into a dive and entered a horizontal turning engagement with their pursuers who held an advantage in horizontal turn-rate, allowing them to engage with guns shooting down more PLAAF jets. Pilots Jing-Chuen Chen, Chun-Hsein Fu, Jie-Tsu Hsia, Shu-Yuen Li, Ta-Peng Ma and Hong-Yan Sung shot down one MiG-17 each, Yi-Chiang Chien shot down two himself and two pairs of pilots Tasi-Chuen Liu with Tang Jie-Min and Hsin-Yung Wang with Yuen-Po Wang shared in the downing of one MiG by each duo. During this engagement one further Fresco sustained notable damage being impacted by an AIM-9 that did not detonate. It escaped with an intact missile within the airframe. The missile was extracted after the MiG returned to base and was later hesitantly transferred to the Soviet Union for reverse engineering, being developed into the K-13 (AA-2 Atoll).
- 2 October 1958 – A RoCAF C-46 Commando was shotdown by anti-aircraft fire from Kinmen, killing all five crewmen.
- 1 / 4' ('5) 10 October 1958 – Over the PRC, four RoCAF F-86F Sabre Pilots engage and shoot down four MiG-17 "Frescos" of the PLAAF. One of the destroyed MiGs explodes, launching debris that strikes one of the Sabres, causing heavy damage. A RoCAF pilot ejected and was held captive until 30 June 1959.
- 29 May 1959 – A RoCAF B-17 Flying Fortress is intercepted and shot down above Guandong by a PLAAF MiG-17 "Fresco", killing all 14 on board.
- (2) 5 July 1959 – Above the Taiwan Straits twenty four PLAAF MiG-17 "Frescos" were engaged by four F-86 Sabres of the RoCAF ending in the destruction of two Frescos.
- 7 October 1959 – Above Beijing a RoCAF RB-57D piloted by Wang Ying Chin was shotdown by an SA-2 Guideline missile. It was first plane to ever be shot down by a surface to air missile.
- 6 November 1961 – Above Shantung province an RB-69A Neptune is destroyed by an SA-2 Guideline missile killing all 13 aboard.
- 9 September 1962 – Fifteen Kilometers south of Nunchang an RoCAF Lockheed U-2A was shotdown by an SA-2 Guideline missile. Pilot Chen Huai Sheng bails out and is captured after landing but dies some time later in a PRC hospital.
- 14 June 1963 – Above Nanchang a RoCAF RB-69A Neptune was shotdown by 23 mm NR-23 cannon-fire from a PLAAF MiG-17PF "Fresco" killing all 14 crew aboard
- 1 November 1963 – Above Jiagxi an SA-2 Guideline shoots down an RoCAF Lockheed U-2C. Pilot Yeh Chang Yi was returning from an intelligence mission where he took aerial photos of Jiayuguan missile test site and Lanzhou nuclear weapons plant. After detecting the first Guideline had been launched at him he made evasive maneuvers and avoided the first only to be struck by a second missile moments later knocking off his right wing. after bailing out and falling into captivity of the PRC he was held until 10 November 1982 when he was released into Hong Kong. He was eventually admitted into the United States after ROC officials denied his attempts to be repatriated.
- 11 June 1964 – A RoCAF RB-69A Neptune was shotdown at night near Yantai on the Shantung Peninsula, after a coordinated effort by a MiG-17F "Fresco" and an Iluyshin Il-28 "Beagle" of the PLAAF, in which the Il-28 dropped illumination flares to help the MiG acquire its target.
- 7 July 1964 – Flying above Fujian, RoCAF pilot Lee Nan Lee was shotdown and killed after his Lockheed U-2G is targeted and struck by an SA-2 Guideline missile.
- 18 December 1964 – Above Wenzhou, an RoCAF RF-101A Voodoo piloted by Hsieh Hsiangho was shotdown by a PLANAF Shenyang J-6. He is captured by fishermen when he ejects above the ocean and is detained until July 1985.
- 10 January 1965 – A RoCAF U-2 was shotdown by an SA-2 Guideline missile on a mission to capture aerial photos of the Baotou uranium enrichment plant using an infrared camera. The pilot, Chang Liyi survives the crash with both legs broken, he is held captive until his release on 10 November 1982. He was eventually admitted into the United States after ROC officials denied his attempts to be repatriated.
- 18 March 1965 – A RoCAF RF-101C Voodoo flown by Chang Yupao was shotdown by a PLAAF MiG-19 "Farmer" piloted by Gao Chang Ji above Guangdong, near Shantou,
- 10 January 1966 – A RoCAF HU-16 Albatross was shot down by a PLAAF MiG-17 "Fresco" while attempting to carry defectors to Taiwan.
- 10 January 1966 – A HU-16 of the Republic of China Air Force was shot down by People's Republic of China PLAAF MiG-17 over Matsu whilst transporting defectors to Taiwan.
- / (2) 13 January 1967 – Four F-104G Starfighters of the RoCAF were engaged by Twelve MiG-19 "Farmers" of the PLAAF. Two Farmers were claimed shot by Hu Shih-Lin and one by Bei-Puo Shih. F-104G No. 64-17779 involved in the engagement does not return and is believed to have been shot down.

=== Bombing of Plaza de Mayo (1955) ===
- 16 June 1955 – A rebel North American AT-6 Texan belonging to the Argentine Naval Aviation was shot down by a loyalist Gloster Meteor of the Argentine Air Force over the Río de la Plata. The pilot was rescued by a Coast Guard boat and captured.
- 16 June 1955 – A rebel North American AT-6 Texan belonging to the Argentine Naval Aviation was hit by anti-aircraft fire over the Ezeiza Airport and crash landed near Tristán Suárez. The pilot was captured.
- 16 June 1955 – A rebel Gloster Meteor belonging to the Argentine Air Force was hit by anti-aircraft fire, puncturing its fuel tank and crash landed at a beach in Carmelo, Uruguay.

=== Suez Crisis (1956) ===
- 29 October 1956 – An Egyptian Ilyushin Il-14 on a flight from Damascus to Cairo was shot down by an Israeli Gloster Meteor NF.13.
- 30 October 1956 – An Egyptian Mikoyan-Gurevich MiG-15 was shot down by an Israeli Dassault Mystère IV over Kabrit.
- 30 October 1956 – An Israeli Piper Cub was shot down by an Egyptian Mikoyan-Gurevich MiG-15.
- 30 October 1956 – An Egyptian Mikoyan-Gurevich MiG-15 performed a maneuver kill that lead an Israeli Gloster Meteor to crash.
- (4) 31 October 1956 – Four Egyptian de Havilland Vampires were shot down by two Israeli Dassault Mystère IVs over Mitla Pass.
- 31 October 1956 – An Egyptian Mikoyan-Gurevich MiG-15 was shot down by an Israeli Dassault Mystère IV. The MiG-15 managed to belly land at Bardawil, northern Sinai and later the aircraft was captured by the Israelis.
- 31 October 1956 – An Egyptian Mikoyan-Gurevich MiG-17 was shot down by an Israeli Dassault Mystère IV.
- (7) 31 October 1956 – Five Israeli North American P-51 Mustangs and two North American Harvards were shot down by Egyptian anti-aircraft fire.
- (3) 1 November 1956 – Three Israeli North American P-51 Mustangs were shot down by Egyptian anti-aircraft fire.
- (2) 2 November 1956 – An Israeli Dassault Mystère IV was shot down by Egyptian anti-aircraft fire. Another North American P-51 Mustang was also shot down by anti-aircraft fire and crash landed in Ras Nasrani.
- 3 November 1956 – A French Navy Vought F4U-7 Corsair was hit by Egyptian anti-aircraft fire at Almaza Air Base and crash landed.
- 3 November 1956 – A Royal Navy Westland Wyvern was hit by Egyptian anti-aircraft fire west of Port Said and the pilot bailed at sea near friendly ships.
- 5 November 1956 – A Royal Navy Westland Wyvern was hit by Egyptian anti-aircraft fire at El Gamil airfield during close air support mission. The pilot bailed at sea near friendly ships.
- 6 November 1956 – A Royal Navy Hawker Sea Hawk was hit by Egyptian anti-aircraft fire near Port Said, causing the fuel tank to catch fire. The pilot bailed safely.
- 6 November 1956 – An RAF English Electric Canberra on a photo-recon mission was shot down by two Syrian Gloster Meteors over Syrian territory. One of the crew member was killed while the other two bailed and landed inside Lebanese territory.
- 7 November 1956 – A Royal Navy Hawker Sea Hawk was hit by Egyptian anti-aircraft fire off Port Said and crashed. The pilot bailed safely.

=== Permesta rebellion (1958–1961) ===
- Allen Lawrence Pope's B-26 Invader shootdown (18 May 1958)

=== Bay of Pigs Invasion (1961) ===
- 15 April 1961 – A Cuban Liberation Air Force Douglas B-26 Invader was shot down by anti-aircraft fire and crashed at sea north of Cuba. All two crew killed.
- 17 April 1961 – A Cuban Revolutionary Air Force Douglas B-26 Invader was shot down by anti-aircraft fire from the invasion fleet over the Bay of Pigs.
- 17 April 1961 – A Cuban Liberation Air Force Douglas B-26 Invader was shot down by a Cuban Revolutionary Air Force Lockheed T-33 and crash landed at an airstrip in Playa Girón.
- 17 April 1961 – A Cuban Liberation Air Force Douglas B-26 Invader was shot down by a Cuban Revolutionary Air Force Lockheed T-33.
- 17 April 1961 – A Cuban Liberation Air Force Douglas B-26 Invader was shot down by a Cuban Revolutionary Air Force Hawker Sea Fury.
- 17 April 1961 – A Cuban Liberation Air Force Douglas B-26 Invader was heavily damaged by a Cuban Revolutionary Air Force Hawker Sea Fury and crashed at sea near Nicaragua.
- 17 April 1961 – A Cuban Liberation Air Force Douglas B-26 Invader was shot down by a Cuban Revolutionary Air Force Lockheed T-33.
- (2) 19 April 1961 – Two Cuban Liberation Air Force Douglas B-26 Invaders was shot down by two Cuban Revolutionary Air Force Lockheed T-33s.

=== West New Guinea dispute (1961–1962) ===
- 17 May 1962 – An Indonesian Air Force Douglas C-47 Skytrain was shot down by a Dutch Navy (MLD) Lockheed P2V Neptune and ditched at sea to the west of Kaimana, Dutch New Guinea. All crew survived and were taken prisoner.

=== Colombian conflict (1964–present) ===
- 9 December 1990 - A police helicopter was shotdown by FARC rebels during clashes in La Uribe.
- 6 July 1997 - A Mil Mi-17 helicopter was shotdown by FARC rebels in Arauca, killing 20.
- 4–7 August 1998 - During the FARC invasion of La Uribe, a Bell UH-1 helicopter was shotdown.
- 2 September 2000 - On mount Montezuma in Pueblo Rico a Douglas AC-47 Spooky airplane was shotdown by FARC rebels during an attack.
- 18–20 October 2000 - During a battle in Dabeiba, a Black Hawk helicopter was shotdown by FARC rebels.
- 4 August 2015 – A Black Hawk helicopter was reportedly shot down by Clan del Golfo during an operation against the criminal organization in northwestern Colombia, killing 16 and injuring 2.
- 21 August 2025 – A Sikorsky UH-60 Black Hawk helicopter was shot down by FARC dissidents during an anti-narcotics mission, killing 13 and injuring 3.

=== Indonesia–Malaysia confrontation (1963–1966) ===
- 18 December 1963 – A British Army Auster AOP.9 was hit by ground fire during a supply drop on Indonesian-Sarawak border and crashed landed in Kandai. One of the crew was killed.
- 16 September 1965 – An Indonesian Air Force Lockheed C-130 Hercules carrying paratroopers was heavily damaged by friendly AAA fire and crashed landed at Long Bawan, North Kalimantan. The paratroopers was forced to bail out. All crew and paratroopers survived.
- 17 November 1965 – An RAF Westland Whirlwind helicopter was shot down by ground fire when it strayed into Indonesian border during a supply drop mission in Sarawak border area. All crew presumably killed.

=== Aden Emergency (1963–1967) ===
- 20 February 1967 – An RAF Hawker Hunter was hit by ground fire over Aden. The pilot bailed.
- 20 June 1967 – The pilot of a British Army Bell Sioux AH.1 was hit by a bullet during take off near Crater, Aden. The helicopter crashed and burnt. All three onboard survived.

=== South African Border War (1966–1990) ===
- 22 September 1975 – A South African Aérospatiale SA 330 Puma helicopter is hit by Cuban Anti-aircraft fire during Operation Savannah. Two crew members die, the remaining 4 survive and avoid capture.
- 4 January 1976 – Another South African Aérospatiale SA 330 Puma helicopter was shotdown by friendly fire during Operation Savannah. Both crew members and 3 passengers die in the crash.
- 13 March 1976 – A Fokker F-27 Friendship parked on the ground offloading arms at UNITA's Gago Coutinho aerodrome is caught by surprise by a group of four Cuban Air Force MiG-21FM. Pilot Rafael Del Pino fires an S-24 unguided rocket destroying it.
- 14 March 1979 – A South African Canberra medium bomber crashes after the pilot is killed by enemy fire during an attack on Cahama, south of Ongiva.
- 6 July 1979 – A South African Dassault Mirage III ID number 856 was shotdown in Cunene, Angola.
- 18 October 1979 – A South African Atlas Impala MKII was shotdown by anti-aircraft fire; the pilot survives and is rescued.
- 12 September 1980 – A South African Atlas Impala MKII from 8th SAAF Squadron was shotdown in Angola, the pilot is declared MIA.
- 10 October 1980 – A South African Atlas Impala MKII was shotdown over South West of Mupa in Southern Angola by SA-7, the pilot, Lautenslager V.P. is killed by SWAPO rebels.
- 1 June 1981 – A South African Atlas Impala MKII was shotdown in Cuvelai, the pilot died in the crash.
- 6 November 1981 – South African Air Force Major Johan Rankin flying a Mirage F-1CZ engaged a Cuban MiG-21FM flown by Major Leonel Ponce, downing his MiG with a burst of 30 mm cannon.
- 5 January 1982 – A South African Aérospatiale SA 330 Puma helicopter is downed by small arms fire, causing a hydraulic pipe to rupture. The helicopter crashed inverted. All 3 occupants died.
- 9 August 1982 – A South African Aérospatiale SA 330 Puma helicopter is hit by 23 mm anti-aircraft fire, causing it to crash inverted, the crew of 3 and 12 Paratroopers were killed.
- 5 October 1982 – Flying his Mirage F-1CZ, Major Johan Rankin engages two Cuban MiG-21FM flown by Lieutenants Raciel Marrero Rodríguez and Gilberto Ortiz Pérez over Angola. Rankin downs the lead MiG with 30 mm cannon-fire followed by a launch of an Matra 550 missile, taking down the wingman. Cuba contests this claim, reporting that the two pilots returned to their base at Lubango airport with some battle damage.
- 25 November 1985 – One Soviet Antonov An-12 was shot down in Cuando Cubango, Angola. Likely by a 9K31 Strela-1 system captured by South African Armed Forces.
- 25 July 1986 – An Angolan Air Force MiG-23ML was shotdown near Menongue, Angola. Pilot Captain Jorge González Pérez is killed.
- 28 October 1987 – UNITA ground fire near Luvuei, Angola shoots down a Cuban MiG-21UM a two-seat variant of the type. Both Cuban crew eject and were captured by UNITA forces.
- 14 November 1987 – A South African Atlas Impala MKII was shotdown by Anti-aircraft fire in Cuvelai during a night mission.
- 20 February 1988 – A South African Dassault Mirage F1 was shotdown by an SA-13 fired by Cuban forces during a raid in Cuando Cubango, Angola.
- 2 March 1988 – A Cuban Air Force MiG-21 piloted by Captain Juan Perez was shotdown by friendly Anti-aircraft fire near Menongue.
- 19 March 1988 – A South African Dassault Mirage F1 ID number 223 was shotdown by a missile in Longa, north of Cuito Cuanavale during a night raid. The pilot, Captain Willie Van Coopehagen, dies in the crash.
- 27 April 1988 – A Cuban Air Force AN-26 was shotdown by friendly fire from 9K32 Strela-2 (SA-7) missiles and anti-aircraft cannons.
- 4 May 1988 – A Cuban Air Force MiG-21 piloted by Carlos Rodriguez Perez was shotdown by a UNITA missile.

=== Naxalite-Maoist insurgency (1967–present) ===
- 17 January 2013 – A helicopter Mil Mi-17 of Indian Air Force was shot down by Naxalites using a light machine gun and other rifles, in the crash there were some injured.

The helicopter was later repaired and flown back to base

=== War of Attrition (1967-1970) ===
- An Israeli F-4 Phantom II was shot down over Syria (June 26, 1970)
- Two Israeli F-4 Phantoms IIs were downed by Egyptian/Soviet SA-2 and SA-3 missile fire (June 30, 1970)
- Another Israeli Phantom IIs was downed by an Egyptian/Soviet surface-to-air missile (Sometime in July, 1970)
- Two Israeli Phantom IIs were downed by Egyptian/Soviet surface-to-air missiles (July 18, 1970)
- An Israeli A-4 Skyhawk was damaged by a Soviet-piloted, Egyptian-flagged MiG-21 after being pursued across the Suez Canal (June 26, 1970)
- / Five Soviet-piloted, Egyptian-flagged MiG-21s were shot down by IAF F-4 Phantom IIs and Dassault Mirage IIIs (July 30, 1970)
- An IAF Super Mystere was destroyed over Israeli territory after sustaining anti-aircraft gunfire (July 31, 1970)
- One IAF Phantom II was destroyed and other damaged by Egyptian/Soviet SA-3 missiles. Moshe Dayan later said that 3 Phantoms were lost in this incident. (August 3, 1970)

These are all the documented cases of shootdowns during the War of Attrition. This adds up to a total of five Soviet aircraft lost (all MiG-21s) and 8 Israeli aircraft lost (7 Phantoms, 1 Super Mystere), with 2 damaged (1 Phantom, 1 Skyhawk). However, many sources claim that Israel lost more aircraft than this. For one example, Israeli historian Benny Morris claims 14 total aircraft lost. Comparing different databases would seem to confirm this number: SIPRI's Arms Transfers database records a transfer of 88 Phantoms to Israel through 1971, however, The Military Balance lists 75 Phantoms in service as of July 1971. Subtracting those numbers leaves 13 unaccounted for, of which seven were confirmed lost in the War of Attrition. If six additional Phantoms were lost, that would equal 14, squaring Morris's number with The Military Balance.

=== Football War (1969) ===
- (3) 17 July 1969 – Honduran Air Force Corsair pilots Captain Fernando and his wingman Captain Edgardo Acosta Soto engaged two Salvadoran TF-51D Cavalier Mustang IIs who were attacking another Corsair while it was strafing ground targets south of Tegucigalpa. Soto entered a turning engagement with one Mustang and blew off its left wing with three bursts of 20 mm cannon, killing pilot Captain Douglas Varela when his parachute did not fully deploy. Later that day the pair spotted two Salvadoran FG-1D Corsairs. They jettisoned hard point stores before climbing and made a diving attack, Soto set one Corsair on fire only to find its wingman on his tail. An intense dogfight between them ended when Soto entered a Split-S giving him a firing solution which he used to shoot down Captain Guillermo Reynaldo Cortez, who died when his FG-1 exploded.

=== The Troubles (Late 1960s–1998) ===
- British Army Gazelle downing (17 February 1978)
- British Army Lynx shootdown (23 June 1988)
- British Army Gazelle shootdown (11 February 1990)
- British Army Lynx shootdown (13 February 1991)
- British Army Lynx shootdown (19 March 1994)
- RAF Puma shootdown (12 July 1994)

=== Yom Kippur War (1973) ===
- (7) 6 October 1973 – Ofira Air Battle
- (6), (17 (EAF claim)/2 (IAF claim)) 14 October 1973 – Al Mansoura Air Battle

=== Cyprus Conflict (1963–1974) ===
- 8 August 1964 – On 8 August 1964, during the Battle of Tylliria, a Turkish F-100 Super Sabre piloted by Captain Cengiz Topel was hit by 40 mm anti-aircraft fire while strafing the Arion, a Greek Cypriot patrol boat. The pilot was able to eject from his aircraft and made a safe parachute jump over land, where he was allegedly tortured to death by Greek Cypriot soldiers.
- (2) 20 July 1974 – During the first day of the conflict, F-100D 55-3756 of 171.Filo and F-100C 54-2042 of 132.Filo were shot down by Greek Cypriot anti-aircraft fire.
- (3) 20 July 1974 – During the first day of the Turkish air campaign, three transport planes – C-47 No.6035, a C-130 of 222.Filo and a C-160 of 221.Filo were damaged by Greek Cypriot anti-aircraft fire. All three salvaged, but played no further part in the conflict.
- 20 July 1974 – During the first day of the conflict, RF-84F 52-7327 of 184.Filo was shot down by Greek Cypriot anti-aircraft fire.
- 20 July 1974 – During the first day of the conflict, a Dornier Do-28D of the Turkish Air Force was shot down north-west of Nicosia.
- (3) 21 July 1974 – F-100D 55-2825 of 111.Filo, F-100C 54-2083 of 112.Filo and F-104G 64-17783 of 191.Filo were shot down by Turkish Navy destroyers.
- (2) 22 July 1974 – Turkish F-100D Super Sabres 54-2238 of 172.Filo and 54-22?? of 171.Filo were lost in action on 22 July over Cyprus due to enemy fire.
- (2) 22 July 1974 – Two transport aircraft (53-234 and 52-144) were accidentally damaged by Greek Cypriot anti-aircraft fire. They managed to land safely in Crete but played no further part in the conflict.

=== Western Sahara War (1975–1991) ===
- 21 January 1976 – A Moroccan Northrop F-5 was shot down by the Polisario Front using SA-7 Strela missiles.
- 18 February 1978 – A Moroccan Northrop F-5 was shot down by the Polisario Front.
- 10 October 1978 – A Moroccan Northrop F-5 was shot down by the Polisario Front using SA-7 Strela missiles.
- 10 February 1979 – A Moroccan Northrop F-5 was shot down by the Polisario Front.
- 12 October 1981 – A Moroccan Dassault Mirage F1 was shot down by the Polisario Front.
- (2) 13 October 1981 – A Moroccan Lockheed C-130 Hercules and Northrop F-5 a were shot down by the Polisario Front using Soviet-made missiles.
- 26 September 1982 – A Moroccan Dassault Mirage F1 was shot down by the Polisario Front. Pilot Ten Mohamed Hadri was captured.
- 12 January 1985– A Moroccan Dassault Mirage F1 was shot down by the Polisario Front near Mansoura Ahmed.
- (2) 13 January 1985 – Two Moroccan Northrop F-5 were shot down by the Polisario Front near the Algerian border.
- 21 January 1985 – A Moroccan North American Rockwell OV-10 Bronco was shot down by the Polisario Front using a 9K32 Strela-2 near Dakhla, Western Sahara.
- 21 August 1987 – A Moroccan Northrop F-5 was shot down by the Polisario Front.

=== Cabinda War (1975–present) ===
- May 18, 2005 – FLEC rebels shot down a military helicopter of the National Air Force of Angola.

=== Mozambican Civil War (1977–1994) ===
- November 1979 – A Rhodesian helicopter was shot down by Mozambican troops while returning from a trip to Gorongossa.
- January 1987 – RENAMO claimed to have shot down an unknown Mozambican helicopter.

=== Ogaden War (1977–1978) ===
- July 1977 – An Ethiopian F-5E was shotdown by a SA-7 Grail MANPADs near Gode.
- July 1977 – An Ethiopian Douglas DC-3 cargo plane from Ethiopian Airlines was shotdown.
- July 1977 – An Ethiopian Douglas C-47 was shotdown by a pair of Somali MiG-17s.
- 24 July 1977 – A Somali MiG-21 was shotdown by an Ethiopian F-5E.
- (2) 25 July 1977 – Two Somali MiG-21s were shot down by Ethiopian F-5Es, another two MiG-21s involved in collisions in the same engagement.
- 26 July 1977 – A Somali MiG-21 was shotdown by an Ethiopian F-5E.
- 19 August 1977 – A Somali MiG-21 was shotdown by an Ethiopian F-5E.
- 21 August 1977 – A Somali MiG-21 was shotdown by an Ethiopian F-5E.
- (2) 1 September 1977 – Two Somali MiG-21s were shot down by a pair of Ethiopian F-5Es.

=== Kurdish–Turkish conflict (1978–present) ===
- 23 February 2008 – a Turkish Army AH-1 Cobra helicopter crashed with PKK militants claiming the downing and posting a video. Turkey confirmed this later in the day, saying that the incident happened "due to an unknown reason".
- 13 May 2016 – PKK militants shot down a Turkish Army AH-1W SuperCobra using a 9K38 Igla (SA-18 Grouse) MANPADS. In the published video, the missile severed the tail section from the rest of the helicopter, causing it to spin, fragment in midair and crash, killing the two pilots on board. The Turkish government initially claimed that it fell due to technical failure, it later became obvious that it had been shot down.
- 10 February 2018 – YPG militants shot down a Turkish Air Force TAI/AgustaWestland T129 ATAK over Kırıkhan district of Hatay province killing two soldiers.
- 18 October 2019 – A Turkish army Sikorsky UH-60 Black Hawk was shot down by a RPG during operations against the SDF near the border city of Ras Al-'Ayn in Syria's Al-Hasakah Governorate.

=== Chadian-Libyan conflict (1978–1987) ===
- 25 January 1984 – A French Air Force SEPECAT Jaguar was shotdown by machine-gun fire from GUNT rebels, its pilot is killed.
- 7 September 1987 – A Libyan Air Force Tupolev Tu-22 with an East German crew was shot down by a MIM-23 Hawk missile fired by the French army while trying to bomb N'Djamena airport.

=== Salvadoran Civil War (1979–1992) ===
- 26 January 1981 – An Aero Commander operated by Aerolineas del Pacifico that was air-dropping arms and ammunition for rebels was destroyed by the Salvadoran Air Force at a small airstrip killing the co-pilot. The pilot was captured by the army.
- 11 May 1981 – A Bell UH-1 Iroquois was hit by machinegun fire and crashed.
- (22) late January 1982 – Battle of Ilopango Airport
- 17 June 1982 – A MD Helicopters MD 500 was shot down by the Farabundo Martí National Liberation Front (FMLN).
- 19 October 1984 – A Cessna O-2A was shot down by the FMLN.
- 12 April 1986 – A Bell UH-1 Iroquois was shot down by the FMLN near San Miguel Air Base.
- 18 November 1989 – A Cessna A-37 Dragonfly was shot down near San Miguel.
- (6) 17 October 1990 – Six Bell UH-1 Iroquois were destroyed in a FMLN attack.
- 23 November 1990 – A Cessna A-37 Dragonfly was shot down using a surface to air missile.
- 2 January 1991 – A Bell UH-1 Iroquois was shot down near Lolotique.
- 19 December 1991 – A Bell UH-1 Iroquois was shot down by the FMLN.

=== Internal conflict in Peru (1980-present) ===
- 2 October 1999 - A Peruvian Army helicopter was shot down by Shining Path guerrillas near Satipo (killing 5).
- 2 September 2009 - Shining Path militants shot down a Peruvian Air Force Mi-17 helicopter, later killing the two pilots with small arms fire.
- 9 May 2012 - A Police Mil Mi-17 helicopter crashed after a Shining Path sniper killed its pilot, with 4 soldiers being wounded by the crash.

=== Iran–Iraq War (1980–1988) ===
- 20 February 1986 – An Iranian Air Force Fokker F27 Friendship is shot down by an Iraqi Air Force MiG-23 with a total of 49 killed including crew and passengers.
- 17 January 1987 – An Iraqi MiG-23ML of unit 63FS shot down a F-14A piloted by Assl-e-Davtalab.
- 19 July 1988 – Two Iraqi Dassault Mirage F1s of unit 115FS shot down two F-14A Tomcats with Super 530 missiles.

=== Falklands War (1982) ===
- Argentine air forces shot down in the Falklands War: a total of 45 aircraft including 4 helicopters (Sea Harrier 21, Sea Dart missile 7, Sea Wolf missile 4, Stinger missile 2, Sea Cat missile 1, Rapier missile 1, Blowpipe missile 1, combination/gunfire 6, friendly fire 2), April 3 – June 14, 1982
- On 4 May 1982, a Sea Harrier FRS.1 was hit by anti-aircraft fire at Goose Green.
- (2) On 21 May 1982, two Gazelle AH.1s were hit by small-arms fire at San Carlos.
- On 21 May 1982, a Harrier GR.3 was hit by a Blowpipe missile at Port Howard.
- On 27 May 1982, a Harrier GR.3 was hit by an anti-aircraft fire at Goose Green.
- On 28 May 1982, a Scout AH.1 was shot down by an IA-58 Pucara at Goose Green.
- On 30 May 1982, a Harrier GR.3 was hit by anti-aircraft fire at Stanley.
- On 1 June 1982, a Sea Harrier FRS.1 hit by a Roland missile at Stanley.
- 6 June 1982, British Army Gazelle friendly fire incident at Bluff Cove.

=== Libyan Gulf of Sidra territorial water dispute ===
- (2) 19 August 1981 – Gulf of Sidra incident (1981): Two Su-22 Fitters of the Libyan Air Force attempted to intercept two American F-14 Tomcats over the Gulf of Sidra, off the coast of Sirte. Both Su-22s were shot down.
- 15 April 1986 – One F-111F of the 48th Fighter Wing of the United States Air Force was shot down over Libya by ground fire during the 1986 United States bombing of Libya.
- (2) 4 January 1989 – 1989 air battle near Tobruk

=== Sri Lankan Civil War (1983–2009) ===
- 13 September 1990 – A Sri Lanka Air Force SIAI-Marchetti SF.260 was shot down near Palaly killing the pilot.
- 5 July 1992 – A Sri Lanka Air Force Shaanxi Y-8 was shot down with a surface to air missile near Palaly killing 19.
- 14 July 1992 – A Sri Lanka Air Force SIAI-Marchetti SF.260 was shot down killing the pilot.
- 2 August 1994 – A Sri Lanka Air Force Bell 212 was shot down by small arms fire.
- (2) 28 April 1995 – two Sri Lanka Air Force Hawker Siddeley HS 748 were shot down near Palay by SA-7 anti-aircraft missiles, the shot downs cost the lives of 43 in the first shootdown and 52 in the second shootdown.
- 14 July 1995 – A Sri Lanka Air Force FMA IA 58 Pucará (tail number CA-601) was shot down by a MANPADS killing the pilot. Pilot Flight Lieutenant Dilhan Perera was killed; his body was recovered by an Air force rescue team.
- (2) 18 November 1995 – A Sri Lanka Air Force Shaanxi Y-8 and a Mil Mi-24 were shot down near Palaly killing four in the Y-8.
- 22 November 1995 – A Sri Lanka Air Force Antonov An-32 charted from Kazakhstan was shot down near Jaffna killing 63 troops.
- 22 January 1996 – A Sri Lanka Air Force Mi-17-1V was shot down by LTTE killing 34.
- 19 March 1996 – A Sri Lanka Air Force Mi-24 was shot down off the coast of Mullaitivu killing seven.
- 20 July 1996 – A Sri Lanka Air Force Mil Mi-8 was shot down.
- (2) 10 November 1997 – A Sri Lanka Air Force Mi-24 was shot down killing two and a Mil Mi-17 crashed landed after being hit.
- 7 January 1998 – A Sri Lanka Air Force Mil Mi-17 was hit with an RPG and mortars and was destroyed.
- 26 June 1998 – A Sri Lanka Air Force Mi-24 was shot down south of Vavuniya killing four.
- 17 December 1999 – A Sri Lanka Air Force Mi-24 was shot down near Paranthan killing four.
- 18 February 2000 – A Sri Lanka Air Force Bell 412 was shot down over Thenmaradchi killing two.
- 30 March 2000 – A Sri Lanka Air Force Antonov AN-26 was shot down near Anuradhapura by SAM killing 40.
- 24 May 2000 – A Sri Lanka Air Force Mi-24 was shot down near Kodikamam killing two.
- 19 October 2000 – A Sri Lanka Air Force Mi-24 was shot down near Nagar Kovil.
- 23 October 2000 – A Sri Lanka Air Force Mi-24 was shot down near the Trincomalee harbour.
- 22 October 2007 – Raid on Anuradhapura Air Force Base: One Bell 212 gunship of the Sri Lankan Air Force either suffered a mechanical failure or was shot down during the attack, killing all four of its crew members.
- (2) 20 February 2009 – 2009 suicide air raid on Colombo: Two Zlin Z-143 light aircraft laden with explosives and flown by two LTTE suicide pilots were shot down by anti-aircraft fire. One impacted a building and detonated; the other crashed before it could reach its target.

=== Lord's Resistance Army insurgency (1987–present) ===
- 25 December 2008 – LRA claimed the downing of an Ugandan military helicopter in the Democratic Republic of Congo.

=== First Nagorno-Karabakh War (1988–1994) ===
- 20 November 1991 – 1991 Azerbaijani Mil Mi-8 shootdown
- 28 January 1992 – 1992 Azerbaijani Mil Mi-8 shootdown – A civilian Azerbaijani helicopter of Azal airlines was shotdown by MANPADs fire from Armenian forces.
- 3 March 1992 – a Russian Federation Mi-26 cargo helicopter and a Mi-24 attack helicopter designed as an escort delivered food to an Armenian village in Polistan. On the way back evacuating civilians and wounded the cargo helicopter is attacked by an Azerbaijani Mi-8, the escort thwarted the attack back. However, MANPADS fire launched from the ground shot down the Mi-26 near the Azerbaijani village of Seidilyar. Of the 50 people on board, 12 were killed.
- 12 May 1992 – A Russian Federation Mi-26 was shotdown by Armenian MANPAD fire in Tavush province, Armenia. Six crewmen died.
- 8 August 1992 – An Azerbaijani Mi-24 was shotdown by Armenian ZU-23-2 anti-aircraft guns, one Armenian 57 mm S-60 gun was destroyed in the same engagement.
- 20 August 1992 – An Azerbaijani two seat MiG-25PD was shotdown, one of the pilots was Alexander Belichenko a Ukrainian national, after being captured by Armenian authorities he is sentenced to death by the Constitutional Court of Armenia. However, diplomatic negotiations by the presidents of Russia, Armenia and Azerbaijan allowed the pardon of Belichenko and other mercenary pilots of Azerbaijan.
- 4 September 1992 – An Azerbaijani MiG-21 was shotdown by Armenian fire, the pilot is captured.
- 12 September 1992 – An Armenian Mi-24 was shotdown by Azerbaijani fire.
- 18 September 1992 – An Azerbaijani Mi-24 was shotdown by Armenian anti-aircraft gunners.
- 10 October 1992 – An Azerbaijani Su-25 was shotdown by Armenian fire in Malibeyli, the pilot could not managed to eject and perished.
- 12 November 1992 – An Armenian Mi-24 was shotdown by Azerbaijani fire.
- 7 December 1992 – An Azerbaijani Mi-24 was shotdown by Armenian fire the Martuni region.
- 7 December 1992 – An Azerbaijani Su-25 was shotdown by Armenian fire the Martuni region.
- 13 June 1992 – An Azerbaijani Su-25 piloted by Vagif Gurbanov was shot down. Gurbanov was killed and awarded the title National Hero of Azerbaijan.
- 15 January 1993 – An Azerbaijani MiG-21 was shot down by Armenian fire.
- 1 September 1993 – An Azerbaijani Mi-24 was shot down by Armenian fire.
- 18 January 1994 – An Armenian Su-25 was shotdown by Azerbaijani fire.
- 17 February 1994 – An Azerbaijan MiG-21 was shotdown in Vedenis region of Armenia, the pilot is captured.
- 17 March 1994 – Iranian Air Force C-130 was shot down by Armenian forces en route from Moscow to Iran.
- 23 April 1994 – An Azerbaijani attack by 7 Su-25s in Stepanakert ends with one Su-25 shot down by air defense. The Azerbaijani side acknowledged the loss but described it as an accident.

=== Later Nagorno-Karabakh conflict (1994–2024) ===
- 12 September 2011 – A UAV was reportedly shot down by the ARDA over the airspace of the unrecognized Republic of Artsakh. Preliminary investigations carried out by the ARDA have determined the model to be a Hermes 450 drone.
- 12 November 2014 – An Armenian Mil Mi-24 was shotdown by Azerbaijani forces, killing the crew of three.
- 2 April 2016 – During a clash between Azerbaijani and Armenian forces, an Azerbaijani Mil Mi-24 helicopter was shot down by Artsakh Republic forces. The downing was confirmed by the Azerbaijani defense ministry.
- 21 April 2020 – An Azerbaijani Orbiter-3 UAV was shot down by an Armenian 9K33 Osa missile system over the Artsakh.
- (2) 27 September 2020 – The Defense Ministry of Azerbaijan confirmed the loss of one helicopter but said that the crew survived the crash. On late December 2020 Armenian social media published footage of an Azerbaijani Mi-17 helicopter crashing in Nagorno Karabakh. Lt. Coronel Ramiz Gasimov, the pilot, is seen ejecting the helicopter; however, he died by wounds after being in coma on 22 October 2020. During the war Azerbaijan officially recognized losing two helicopters.
- 28 September 2020 – An Azerbaijani Antonov An-2 was shot down by Armenian anti-aircraft artillery near the town of Martuni, Nagorno-Karabakh.
- 29 September 2020 – Armenian Defense Ministry claimed that an Armenian Air Force Su-25 was shot down by a Turkish Air Force F-16 killing the pilot. However, Turkey denied the event.
- 4 October 2020, An Azerbaijani Air force Su-25 attack aircraft was shotdown by Armenian forces while targeting Armenian positions in Fuzuli. The pilot, Col. Zaur Nudiraliyev died in the crash. Azerbaijani officials acknowledged the loss in December 2020.
- 19 October 2020, A Turkish-made Bayraktar TB2 operated by Azerbaijan is reported shot down by air defense weapons of Armenian Army over the skies of Nagorno-Karabakh.
- 8 November 2020, another Azerbaijani Bayraktar TB2 was shot down by air defense weapons on southeastern Nagorno Karabakh.
- 9 November 2020 – A Russian Mi-24 combat helicopter was shot down by Azerbaijani forces near the border with Armenia. Two crewmembers died and a third was wounded. The government of Azerbaijan stated the shootdown was an accident and offered an apology.

=== Iraqi no-fly zones (1991–2003) ===
- 20 March 1991 – USAF F-15C vs. IQAF Su-22 – In accordance with the ceasefire, an F-15C shot down an Iraqi Su-22 fighter-bomber with an AIM-9M Sidewinder missile.
- 27 December 1992 – USAF F-16D vs. IQAF MiG-25 – A MiG-25 was shot down by an F-16D using an AIM-120 AMRAAM missile after crossing the no-fly zone. It is the first kill with an AIM-120, and also the first USAF F-16 kill.
- 17 January 1993 – USAF F-16C vs. IQAF MiG-23 – A USAF F-16C shot down an IQAF MiG-23. It was the second kill made with an AIM-120 AMRAAM.
- (2) 14 April 1994 – UH-60 Black Hawk friendly fire shootdown incident
- 23 December 2002 – USAF RQ-1 Predator vs. IQAF MiG-25 – In what was the last aerial victory for the Iraqi Air Force before Operation Iraqi Freedom, an Iraqi MiG-25 shot down an American RQ-1 Predator UAV after the drone opened fire on the Iraqi aircraft with a Stinger missile.

=== Croatian War of Independence (1991–1995) ===
- Battle of Šibenik: on 19 September 1991 a Yugoslavian J-21 Jastreb ground-attack aircraft was shot down by a Croatian 9K32 Strela-2 missile over Šibenik. The aircraft fell to the sea and the action was recorded by what became an iconic video of the Croatian War of Independence.
- (2) Battle of the Dalmatian Channels: on 15 November 1991, Croatian forces claim that their anti-aircraft artillery shot down two Yugoslavian J-21 Jastreb ground-attack aircraft (one confirmed).
- 1992 European Community Monitor Mission helicopter downing (7 January 1992): A Yugoslav MiG-21 shot down an Italian Army Agusta-Bell AB-206L helicopter on an EU mission at Podrute, south west of Varaždin, Croatia.
- 14 September 1993: A Croatian MiG 21 was hit by a SA-6 missile over Gvozd (then Vrginmost) after a successful strike on Serb positions at Vranovina, south of Topusko: the pilot, Miroslav Peris, was killed in action when his aircraft exploded in flames near Stipan.
- 2 May 1995: a Croatian MiG 21 piloted by Rudolf Perešin was shot down while on air-to-ground support mission near Stara Gradiška by Serb anti-aircraft fire, in the course of Operation Flash. Perešin was killed in action.

=== First Abkhazia War (1992–93) ===
- – 5 September 1992: A Georgian Army helicopter was shotdown by 14.5 mm heavy machine-gun fire from Abkhazian fighters.
- – 14 December 1992: Georgian forces shot down a Russian Mi-8 helicopter using SA-14 MANPADs, killing 3 crew members and 56 passengers, mostly Russian refugees.
- – December 1992: Russian and Abkhazian force shot down a Georgian Mi-8 with a SA-7 or SA-14 missile.
- – 15 January 1993: Georgian forces shot down a Russian Su-25 ground attack fighter near Tkvarcheli.
- – 15 January 1993: A Georgian Mi-8 helicopter was shotdown in the area as well.
- – 19 March 1993: A Russian Air Force Su-27S flew to intercept two Georgian Su-25s approaching the Sokhumi area, the Russian Su-27 was destroyed by a SA-2 missile. The Pilot, Maj. Schipko was killed.
- – 3 July 1993: Georgian forces shot down a Russia Su-25 over Sokhumi.
- – 4 July 1993: Georgian forces shot down two Russian aircraft, one Yak-52 reconnaissance aircraft and a Mi-8T during the Siege of Tkvarcheli.
- – 4 July 1993: Russian and Abkhazian forces shot down a Georgian Su-25 with a SA-14 missile over Nizhnaya Eshera.
- – 5 July 1993: Georgian forces reported the loss of a Su-25 to friendly fire.
- – 7 July 1993: Abkhazians shot down a Georgian Mi-8 while evacuating refugees from Sokhumi, killing 20 persons.
- – 30 September 1993: Abkhazians shot down another Georgian Mi-8 near Racaka.
- – 4 October 1993: Abkhazians shot down another Georgian Mi-8 transporting 60 refugees en route from Abkhazia to Svaneti.
- – December 1993: Abkhazians shot down a Georgian helicopter, likely a Mi-24 before OSCE Ceasefire.

=== Bosnian War (1992–1995) ===
- 3 September 1992 – An Italian Air Force (Aeronautica Militare Italiana) G.222 transport aircraft was shot down when approaching Sarajevo airfield, while conducting a United Nations relief mission. It crashed 18 miles (29 km) from the airfield; a NATO rescue mission was aborted when 2 USMC CH-53 helicopters came under small arms fire. The cause of the crash was determined to be a surface-to-air missile, but it was not clear who fired it. Everyone on board – four Italian crew members and four French passengers – died in the crash.
- (4) 28 February 1994 – Banja Luka incident: four USAF F-16s shot down four Serb J-21 Jastrebs after the latter bombed a Bosnian ammunition factory in Novi Travnik, in violation of the no-fly zone established by NATO.
- 16 April 1994 – A Sea Harrier of the 801 Naval Air Squadron, operating from the aircraft carrier HMS Ark Royal, was brought down by an Igla-1 surface-to-air missile fired by the Army of Republika Srpska while attempting to bomb two Bosnian Serb tanks over Gorazde. The pilot, Lieutenant Nick Richardson, ejected and landed in territory controlled by friendly Bosnian Muslims.
- 2 June 1995: A USAF F-16 piloted by Captain Scott O'Grady was shot down by a Serb SA-6 missile. The pilot was rescued by Marines seven days after shoot-down.
- 30 August 1995 – one French Air Force Mirage 2000N-K2 was shot down over Bosnia by a 9K38 Igla MANPADS, fired by air defence units of Army of Republika Srpska during operation Deliberate Force. Both pilots were captured by Serbian forces.

=== United Nations Operation in Somalia (1992–1995) ===
- (2) 3 October 1993 – Battle of Mogadishu (1993)

=== Venezuelan coup d'état attempt (November 1992) ===
- (3) 27 November 1992 – Three OV-10 Bronco aircraft flown by rebel pilots were shot down over Caracas, at least one by a loyalist F-16.

=== Aegean dispute ===
- On 18 June 1992, a Greek Mirage F1CG crashed near the island of Agios Efstratios in the Northern Aegean, during a low-altitude dogfight with two Turkish F-16s. Greek pilot Nikolaos Sialmas was killed in the crash.
- Οn 8 February 1995, a Turkish F-16C crashed on the sea after being intercepted by a Greek Mirage F1CG. The Turkish pilot Mustafa Yildirim bailed out and was rescued by a Greek helicopter. After brief hospitalization in Rhodes, the pilot was handed over to the Turkish side.
- On 27 December 1995, a pair of Greek F-16Cs intercept a pair of Turkish F-4E. During the dogfight that followed, one of the Turkish aircraft went into a steep dive and crashed into the sea, killing its pilot Altug Karaburun. The co-pilot Ogur Kilar managed to bail out safely and was rescued by a Greek ΑΒ-205 helicopter. He was returned to Turkey after receiving first aid treatment in Lesbos.
- On 8 October 1996 – 7 months after the escalation of the dispute with Turkey over the Imia/Kardak islands, a Greek Mirage 2000 fired an R.550 Magic II missile and shot down a Turkish F-16D over the Aegean Sea. The Turkish pilot died, while the co-pilot ejected and was rescued by Greek forces. In August 2012, after the downing of a RF-4E on the Syrian Coast, Turkish Defence Minister İsmet Yılmaz confirmed that the Turkish F-16D was shot down by a Greek Mirage 2000 with an R.550 Magic II in 1996 flying in the disputed airspace near Chios island. Greece denies that the F-16 was shot down. Athens says that Turkish pilot reported a control failure. It also claims that the jet was in disputed airspace because one of the Turkish pilots was rescued in the Greek flight information region. Both Mirage 2000 pilots reported that the F-16 caught fire and they saw one parachute.
- / On 23 May 2006, a Greek F-16 and a Turkish F-16 collided approximately 35 nautical miles south off the island of Rhodes, near the island of Karpathos during a Turkish reconnaissance flight involving two F-16Cs and a RF-4. Greek pilot Kostas Iliakis was killed, whereas the Turkish pilot Halil İbrahim Özdemir bailed out and was rescued by a cargo ship.
- In April 2018, Greek Air Force jet crashed into the Aegean Sea on Thursday, killing the pilot, as he returned from a mission to intercept Turkish aircraft that had violated the country's airspace, Greek officials said. Greek officials said nothing about what might have caused the crash, or whether it was connected to a confrontation with Turkish jets, though they stressed that the crash occurred several kilometers from the site of the interception mission.

=== Insurgency in Ogaden (1994–2018) ===
- 18 July 2006 – An Ethiopian airforce Mil Mi-8 was shot down by the Ogaden National Liberation Front near Gabo Gabo killing 26.

=== Cenepa War (1995) ===
- 29 January 1995 – A Peruvian Mil Mi-8 was shot down by Ecuadorian forces using a Blowpipe missile between Base Sur and Coangos, killing five.
- 7 February 1995 – A Peruvian Mil Mi-24 was shot down by Ecuadorian forces using a 9K38 Igla missiles at Base Sur, killing three.
- ("3") 11 February 1995 – Two Peruvian Sukhoi Su-22s and a Cessna A-37 Dragonfly were shot down by Ecuadorian Dassault Mirage F1s and IAI Kfir.
- 17 February 1995 – A Peruvian Mil Mi-8 was hit by AAA fire and crash landed.

=== Eritrean–Ethiopian War (1998–2000) ===
- 2 June 1998 – An Ethiopian MiG-23BN was shot down by Eritrean anti-aircraft fire while doing a bombing run on Asmara International Airport.
- 6 June 1998 – An Ethiopian MiG-21 was shot down by Eritrean anti-aircraft fire.
- 6 June 1998 – An Etrirean Aermacchi MB-339 was shot down by Ethriopia north of Mekelle.
- 14 February 1999 – An Ethiopian Mi-24 Attack helicopter ethier crashed or was shot down near Burre.
- 25 February 1999 – An Eritrean Mig-29 was shot down by a R-73 Air to air missile fired from a Su-27, the Mig-29 crashed near Badme.
- 26 February 1999 – An Eritrean Mig-29 was shot down near Badme by an Ethiopian Su-27 piloted by Aster Tolossa.
- (2) On 26 February 1999, Two Ethiopian MiG-21s were shot down by Eritrean MIG-29s.
- 15 May 2000 – An Ethiopian Mi-35 was shot down attacking a water tank near Barentu by Eritrean ZSU-23 fire.
- 16 May 2000 – An Eritrean MiG-29 was shot down my Ethiopian Su-27s.
- 16 May 2000 – An Eritrean MiG-29 was damaged by an Ethiopian Su-27s and later crash landed at Asmara.

=== NATO bombing of Yugoslavia (1999) ===
- (2) 24 March 1999 – two Yugoslav Air Force MiG-29 were shot down by two USAF F-15C with AMRAAM missiles.
- 24 March 1999 – During Operation Allied Force, Royal Netherlands Air Force F-16AM J-063 flown by Major Peter Tankink shot down one Yugoslavian MiG-29, flown by Lt. Colonel Milutinović, with an AMRAAM missile. The pilot of the stricken jet ejected safely. This marked the first air-to-air kill made by a Dutch fighter since WW2.
- (2) 26 March 1999 – two Yugoslavian MiG-29 were shot down by two USAF F-15C with AMRAAM missiles.
- 27 March 1999 – 1999 F-117A shoot-down – An American F-117A Nighthawk stealth bomber was shot down over Belgrade by a Yugoslav S-125E (NATO: SA-3 Goa). The pilot ejected safely and the plane's wreckage was recovered by Serbian special forces. It was the only stealth aircraft shot down by a surface to air missile.
- 2 May 1999 – a USAF F-16CG was shot down over Serbia. It was downed by an S-125 Neva SAM (NATO: SA-3) near Nakucani. Its pilot; Lt. Col David Goldfein, 555th Fighter Squadron commander, managed to eject and was later rescued by a combat search-and-rescue (CSAR) mission. The remains of this aircraft are on display in the Yugoslav Aeronautical Museum, Belgrade International Airport.
- 4 May 1999 – A lone Yugoslav MiG-29 flown by Lt. Col. Milenko Pavlović attempted to intercept a large NATO formation that was returning to base, having just bombed Valjevo (the pilot's home town). It was engaged by a pair of USAF F-16CJs from the 78th Fighter Squadron and was shot down with an AIM-120 AMRAAM, killing the pilot. The falling wreckage was also hit by a Strela-2M mistakenly fired by the Yugoslavian army.

=== India–Pakistan military confrontation (1992, 1996, 1999, 2019 and 2025) ===
- 1 August 1992- Two Pakistani Lama helicopters were detected by Indian forces which fired IGLA missiles upon them. One of the helicopters carrying commander of 323rd Brigade, Brigadier Masood Anwari got struck by a missile, killing him and two others.
- 26 August 1996 – During the Siachen conflict over the disputed Siachen Glacier region in Kashmir, an Indian Mi-17 helicopter was shot down by Pakistani forces with a surface to air missile. Four crew members died in the crash.
- 2 July 1997 – During the Siachen conflict over the disputed Siachen Glacier region in Kashmir, an Indian HAL Cheetah helicopter was shot down by Pakistani forces. Both pilots died in the crash.
- (2) 27 May 1999 – During the Kargil War in the Kashmir region, one Indian Air Force MiG-27 was shot down by Pakistani forces using an Anza missile. Its wingman, flying in a MiG-21 was shot down by a Pakistani Stinger missile while trying to locate the downed MiG-27 pilot.
- 28 May 1999 – An Indian Air Force strike formation composed by four Mi-17 helicopters came under fire by MANPADS, one was hit and shot down, killing all four on board.
- 10 August 1999 – Pakistan Naval Air Arm Atlantique shootdown. The Atlantique plane was shot down by an IAF MiG-21 of the 45th Indian Air Force Squadron using a R-60 infrared homing missile.
- 27 February 2019 – India confirmed that it lost one MiG-21 from the 51st fighter squadron in an air skirmish with Pakistan Air Force F-16s.
- 27 February 2019 – An Indian Air Force Mil Mi-17V-5 was shot down by friendly fire in Budgam district, Jammu and Kashmir. Six military personnel and one civilian were killed.
- (3) 7 May 2025 - During an Indian military operation in Kashmir three Indian aircraft, one Rafale EH, one Mirage 2000 and one Su-30MKI were shot down by PAF J-10c.

=== Second Chechen War (1999–2009) ===
- Khankala Mi-26 shootdown (19 August 2002)

=== Kivu conflict (2004–present) ===
- (2) 27 January 2017 – Two helicopters operated by mercenaries were shot down by M23 rebels near the town of Rutshuru.
- United Nations 28 March 2022 – A United Nations peacekeeping helicopter carrying eight was shot down by M23 Rebels.
- 17 June 2022 – A Congolese helicopter gunship was shot down by M23 Rebels in North Kivu.

=== Chadian Civil War (2005–2010) ===
- 28 November 2006 – Chadian Air Force plane was shot down by UFDD rebels near the town of Abeche. Rebels also claimed to have shot down a helicopter which was not confirmed by the government.

=== 2006 Lebanon War ===
- 12 August 2006 – Hezbollah fighters shot down an Israeli CH-53 Yas'ur with an anti-tank missile, killing five air crew members.

=== Mexican drug war (2006–present) ===
- 1 May 2015 – A Mexican airforce Eurocopter EC725 (sometimes incorrectly referred to as a Blackhawk) was shot down by Jalisco New Generation Cartel using RPG-7s. The helicopter crashed, killed eight on board.

=== Russo-Georgian War (2008) ===
- (3) 20 April 2008 – Georgian officials claimed a Russian MiG-29 shot down a Georgian Hermes 450 unmanned aerial vehicle and provided video footage from the ill-fated drone showing an apparent MiG-29 launching an air-to-air missile at it. Russia denies that the aircraft was theirs and says they did not have any pilots in the air that day. Abkhazia's administration claimed its own forces shot down the drone with an L-39 aircraft "because it was violating Abkhaz airspace and breaching ceasefire agreements". UN investigation concluded that the video was authentic and that the drone was shot down by a Russian MiG-29 or Su-27 using a R-73 heat seeking missile.
- 8 August 2008 – The first Russian Air Force loss of the campaign was a Su-25, piloted by Lieutenant Colonel Oleg Terebunsky of the 368th Attack Aviation Regiment. It was shot down over South Ossetia near the Zarsk pass, between Dzhava and Tskhinvali. It was hit by friendly fire, a MANPADS missile fired by South Ossetian militia at around 18:00. Earlier in the day, a flight of four Georgian Air Force Su-25 planes had attacked a Russian army convoy in the same area. This was one of the few missions conducted by Georgia's Su-25s during the brief conflict Georgia believed its aircraft would soon become easy targets for Russian interceptors. The Georgian aircraft returned to their bases and were hidden under camouflage netting to prevent them from being located.
- 9 August 2008 – a Russian Tu-22M3 was shot down in South Ossettia by a Georgian Buk-M1 surface-to-air-missile system during the Russo-Georgian War. Three of the four crew members were killed, while the co-pilot was taken POW by Georgian forces.
- 9 August 2008 – A Russian Su-24 was shot down by Georgian air defense forces with an anti-aircraft missile south of Tskhinvali during the morning. Both pilots ejected, but the co-pilot died impacting the ground when his parachute was damaged by fire. The wounded pilot was captured by Georgian forces. This loss was not initially acknowledged by Russia, while verified later by independent sources. The captured pilot, Major Igor Zinov, was shown on Georgian TV while being hospitalized together with the co-pilot of the downed Tu-22MR.
- 9 August 2008 – A Russian Su-25 piloted by Colonel Sergey Kobylash, commander of the 368th Attack Aviation Regiment, was hit by a Georgian MANPADS during a daylight strafing run on a Georgian military formation south of Tskhinvali, on the Gori-Tskhinvali road at 10:30: after making his initial approach, Kolybash's aircraft was struck by a missile that hit his left engine, destroying it. Not long after, as Kobylash was returning to base at an altitude of 1000 meters, a second MANPADS missile struck his right engine, leaving the plane without thrust. Kobylash was able to glide to Russian controlled territory before ejecting north of Tskhinvali in a South Ossetian village of the Georgian enclave in the Great Liakh gorge, where he was recovered by a Russian combat search-and-rescue team. Shortly after Kobylash was rescued, South Ossetian militants claimed they had downed a Georgian Su-25; however, Georgian Air Force did not operate since the day before, likely making the second fatal hit on this Su-25 another friendly fire incident.
- 9 August 2008 – A Su-24 was shot down in a friendly fire incident by a Russian SAM, while it was escorting a Russian column on the Tskhinvali-Gori highway. The crew ejected and was recovered by a search-and-rescue helicopter.

=== Boko Haram insurgency (2009–present) ===
- 11 September 2014 – One Nigerian Air Force Alpha Jet either crashed or was shot down while on operations against Boko Haram near the town of Yola. The two pilots were captured and later beheaded.
- 31 March 2021 – One Nigerian Air Force Alpha Jet 475 serial number 475 crashed. Boko Haram released footage purportedly showing themselves downing the plane.

=== Nigerian bandit conflict (2011–present) ===
- 19 July 2021 – In a rare case of a military jet being brought down by a criminal gang, one Nigerian Air Force Alpha Jet was shot down by bandits in Kaduna State after a combat mission against the gangs and coming under intense ground fire. The pilot ejected and evaded capture till reaching an Army base.

=== Central African Republic Civil War (2012–present) ===
- 23 March 2013 – Séléka rebels allegedly shot down a helicopter while advancing on Bangui.

=== Insurgency in Northern Chad (2016–present) ===
- 29 April 2021 – Rebels from the FACT claimed to have destroyed a helicopter near Nokou in Kanem. A military spokesman stated that the helicopter, claimed to have been shot down by rebels, crashed due to "technical failures" far from the battlefield.

=== Insurgency in Cabo Delgado (2017–present) ===
- 8 April 2020 – Mozambique Air Force Gazelle helicopter was damaged by small arms fire by ISIS and reportedly crashed down. ISIS released footage of the downed helicopter.
- 23 June 2021 – Mozambique Air Force Mil Mi-17 crashed after being hit by small arms fire near Afungi camp.

=== Persian Gulf crisis (2019) ===
- 20 June 2019 – The Iranian Revolutionary Guard Corps shot down an American RQ-4A Global Hawk over the Strait of Hormuz. The United States responded with cyberattacks against Iranian air defense infrastructure.

=== Tigray War (2020–2022) ===
- 29 November 2020 – An Ethiopian Air Force MiG-23 crashed during the Tigray conflict near Abiy Addi, 50 kilometers west of Mekelle. The pilot ejected and was captured by the Tigray People's Liberation Front who claimed they shot it down, showing the pilot with his Zsh-7 flying helmet (originally intended for Su-27 and MiG-29), a flight suit, a MiG-23 English manual and the crash site with charred metal parts.
- 6 December 2020 – An Ethiopian Air Force MiG-23 crashed 425 meters from Shire Inda Selassie airport.
- 20 April 2021 – An Ethiopian Mi-35 was lost near Guya killing three. The TDF claims to have shot it down and released a video of the crashed helicopter.
- 23 June 2021 – An Ethiopian Air Force Lockheed L-100 Hercules, serial number 5022 carrying explosives, military officers, and Eritrean camouflage uniforms was shot down near Gijet.
- 11 November 2021 – An Ethiopian Mi-35 helicopter was shot down by the TDF in the district of Mille.
- 24 August 2022 – The Ethiopian Air Force shot down a plane carrying weapons that suspected to transport arms to the Tigray People's Liberation Front in the Ethiopia–Sudan border. Sudanese officials denied the involvement in the incident.

=== Republican insurgency in Afghanistan (2021–present) ===
- 16 June 2022 – A Taliban airforce Mil Mi-17 was shot down by the NRF in the Arezoo valley, two crew were killed and four captured.

=== 2023 Chinese balloon incident ===
- On February 4, 2023, at 2:39 p.m. EST an F-22 Raptor, with Pilot Frank 01, fired an AIM-9X Sidewinder missile at a military spy balloon belonging to China that had traversed North America over the previous several days. The balloon was brought down six nautical miles off the coast of Myrtle Beach, South Carolina. US officials called the craft an "intelligence gathering" balloon, while Chinese authorities claimed it was a weather research device. (This is the first confirmed time since WWII that the United States has taken down a foreign military asset over US territory).

=== Gaza war ===
In Gaza:

- On 7 October 2023, an Israeli CH-53D Yas'ur helicopter was destroyed by Hamas militants hours after the attack at Be'eri kibutz.
- On 27 October 2023, an Israeli Skylark II drone was shot down above the Gaza Strip.
- On 30 November 2023, an Israeli Skylark II drone was shot down on central Gaza.

In Lebanon:

- On 5 November 2023 during the Lebanon Israeli clashes, Hezbollah shot down an Israeli Hermes 450 drone that was flying over Nabatieh south of Lebanon. Wreckage of the drone fell over houses in the towns of Zabdin and Harouf.
- On 18 November 2023 an Israeli drone was shot down by Hezbollah on the Lebanon-Israel border near al-Jalil Panhandle.
- On 26 February 2024, Hezbollah shot down a Hermes 450 drone with a surface to air missile.
- On 6 April 2024, Hezbollah shot down an Israeli Hermes 900 drone.
- On 22 April 2024, Hezbollah shot down an Israeli Hermes 450 drone in the town of Asichiyeh near the border. Israeli and Hezbollah sources reported.
- On 1 June 2024, Hezbollah shot down an Israeli drone in Lebanon, Israeli officials and Hezbollah reported. According to Hezbollah the drone shotdown was a Hermes 900 Kochav.
- On 22 October 2024, Hezbollah shot down another Israeli Hermes 450 drone in Tayr Harfa. Israeli Defense Forces confirmed the loss to The Times of Israel.
- On 29 October 2024, Hezbollah shot down another Israeli Hermes 900 Kochav drone in Marjayoun.

=== Iran war (2026–present) ===
- (2) 2 March 2026 - Two Iranian low-flying Sukhoi Su-24s were shot down over the Persian Gulf by a QEAF Boeing F-15EX Eagle II, after they failed to respond to radio warnings. The Su-24s were targeting the Al Udeid Air Base in Qatar. This shootdown marked the first aerial kills achieved by the Qatar Emiri Air Force.
- (3) 2 March 2026 - Three USAF McDonnell Douglas F-15E Strike Eagles were shot down over Kuwait by friendly fire from Kuwaiti air defences. The six crew members ejected safely into Kuwait. It was later confirmed that the three F-15Es were shot down by a Kuwaiti Air Force McDonnell Douglas F/A-18 Hornet after it made an incorrect Identification friend or foe. One F-15E crashed near Al Jahra in central Kuwait, while the other two crashed near Kuwait City.
- 4 March 2026 - An Iranian Yakovlev Yak-130 was shot down by an Israeli Lockheed Martin F-35 Lightning II over Tehran in air-to-air combat. The fate of the two Iranian pilots is unknown. This event was the first Israeli-Iranian dogfight of the war. It occurred at Latyan Dam near Lavasan city, Tehran province.
- (2) 3 April 2026 - A USAF McDonnell Douglas F-15E Strike Eagle was shot down over Iran by Iranian forces, both the pilot and the (WSO) ejected and landed inside Iranian territory, a massive CSAR operation was launched involving hundreds of U.S. special operations forces, aircraft and a temporary (FOB) airstrip was also established inside Iran. The pilot was rescued within 7 hours, while it took roughly 2 days to rescue the WSO. During this CSAR operation another USAF aircraft, this time a Fairchild Republic A-10 Thunderbolt II was shot down by Iranian forces, the A-10 made it to Kuwaiti airspace where the pilot ejected and was later rescued, while the A-10 crashed.

== Civilian aircraft ==
List of airliner shootdown incidents – dealing with civilian airliners

- 1996 shootdown of Brothers to the Rescue aircraft – Two civilian Cessna Skymasters operated by the activist group Brothers to the Rescue were engaged by the Cuban air force and shot down north of Havana.

=== Indonesian National Revolution (1945–1949) ===
- 1947 Yogyakarta Dakota incident – An Indian Douglas C-47 Dakota chartered by the Indonesian government to carry medical supplies was shot down by two Curtiss P-40 Warhawk operated by Royal Netherlands East Indies Army Air Force.

=== Colombian conflict (1964–present) ===
- Avianca Flight 203 - A Colombian domestic passenger flight from El Dorado International Airport in Bogotá to Alfonso Bonilla Aragón International Airport in Cali, Colombia was destroyed by a bomb over the municipality of Soacha on November 27, 1989. All 107 people on board as well as three people on the ground were killed. The bombing had been ordered by the Medellín drug cartel.
- 12 February 2003 - FARC rebels kidnapped three American contractors, Marc Gonsalves, Thomas Howes, and Keith Stansell, after their counternarcotics plane was shotdown by the rebels in the Colombian jungle. Two other individuals on the plane, American Thomas Janis and Colombian Sergeant Luis Alcides Cruz, were murdered by FARC members at the crash site. The three Americans were held for over five years before being rescued in 2008.
- May 20, 2011 - FARC attack in Cauca on a helicopter transporting money leaves one policeman and three civilians wounded.
- 13 May 2015 – A Hawker 800 carrying 1.2 metric tons of cocaine was intercepted by first the Venezuelan and then the Colombian air force. Venezuelan officials claimed to have shot down the jet, while Colombian officials claimed that it suffered an engine failure and crashed. The body of the aircraft's pilot was later recovered by the Colombian coast guard.
- 14 March 2016 – A police helicopter was shot down by ELN, killing all four police officers on board.

=== War on Drugs on Peru ===
- 2001 Peru Cessna 185 shootdown – A Cessna 185 floatplane flown by a Christian missionary was shot down by a Cessna A-37 Dragonfly operated by the Peruvian Air Force after it was mistaken for a drug smuggling plane during patrols conducted under the Air Bridge Denial Program, in cooperation with the CIA.

=== Sri Lankan Civil War (1983–2009) ===
- Lionair Flight 602

=== Somali Civil War (1991–present) ===
- 4 May 2020 – An Embraer EMB 120 Brasilia was shot down in a friendly fire incident by Ethiopian force; the aircraft crashed, killing six on board.

=== Rio de Janeiro drug war (1992–present) ===
- 17 October 2009 – A police helicopter of the Rio De Janeiro police force was shot down by gang members of Comando Vermelho during a shootout with police and exploded on a football field, killing two police officers; another died later. The event was captured on video by a television cameraman who was embedded with the police on the ground.
- 19 November 2016 – In a similar incident, another Rio de Janeiro police helicopter was shot down by small-arms fire during a clash with gang members of Comando Vermelho and crashed in a ditch. All four police officers on board were killed.

=== Mexican drug war (2006-present) ===
- September 6, 2016 – a Mexican cartel gang shoots down a helicopter in the western state of Michaocán. The helicopter was shot down in the region of Apatzingán, a city located in Tierra Caliente (Hot Land), a region that has been beset by drug violence and vigilante justice for years.

=== Nigerian bandit conflict (2011-present) ===
- 13 August 2023 - Bandits ambushed Nigerian security forces, killing 23 soldiers and three civilian vigilantes. A helicopter rescuing people from the scene also crashed due to gunfire from bandits.

=== Ukraine-Russia War (2014–present) ===
- Malaysia Airlines Flight 17
- Azerbaijan Airlines Flight 8243

=== Haitian conflict (2020–present) ===
- 12 May 2025 - A helicopter was targeted by gang members in the Carrefour Vincent area, where bandits opened fire on the aircraft as it flew overhead. Several bullets hit the helicopter, forcing it to crash a short distance away in the Bourdon neighborhood, there were no casualties.
- 14 November 2025 – A police helicopter was destroyed following an operation in Croix-des-Bouquets that left seven gang members dead.

== See also ==
- List of Russian aircraft losses in the Second Chechen War
- List of aviation shootdowns and accidents during the Iraq War
- List of combat losses of United States military aircraft since the Vietnam War

== Notes ==
=== Bibliography ===
- Aloni, Shlomo (2001). Arab-Israeli air wars 1947–82 (2001 ed.). Osprey Publishing. ISBN 1-84176-294-6.
- Polack, Peter. The Last Hot Battle of the Cold War: South Africa vs. Cuba in the Angolan. Casemate Publishers. ISBN 978-1-61200-195-1
