= Safa Akhundov =

National Hero of Azerbaijan

- Səfa Fətulla oğlu Axundov
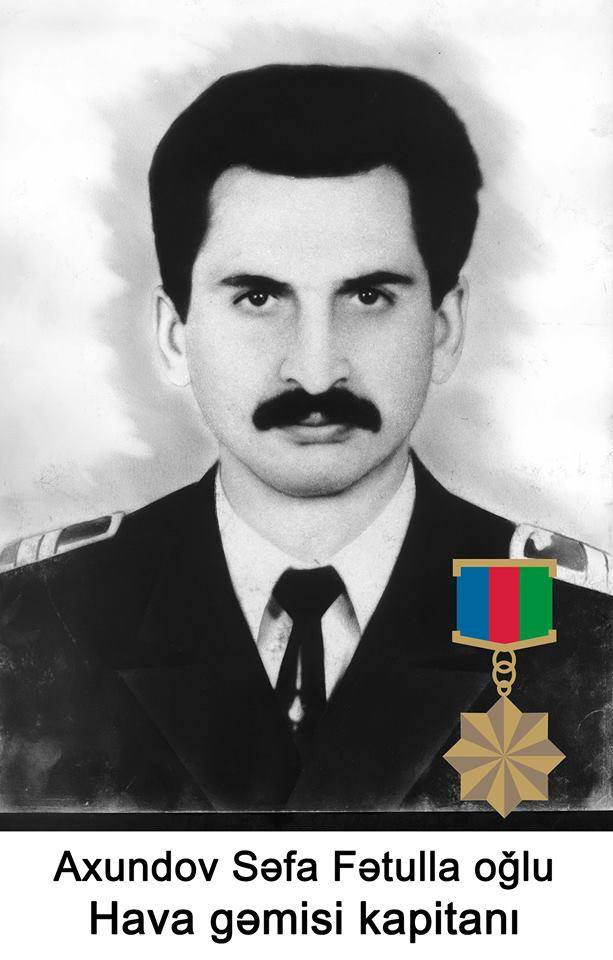
- Born: June 19, 1958; Masallı, Azerbaijan SSR
- Died: 1992; Shusha, Azerbaijan
- Military career
- Allegiance: Azerbaijan
- Branch: Azerbaijani Air and Air Defence Force
- Service years: 1991-1992
- Conflicts: First Nagorno-Karabakh War
- Awards: National Hero of Azerbaijan; 1992

Safa Fatulla oghly Akhundov (Azerbaijani: Səfa Fətulla oğlu Axundov) (19 June 1958, Masallı, Azerbaijan SSR - 1992, Shusha, Azerbaijan) was a National Hero of Azerbaijan and warrior during the First Nagorno-Karabakh War.

== Early life and education ==
Akhundov was born on June 19, 1958, in Masalli Rayon of Azerbaijan SSR. He received his first education in Saatli, then moved to Jalilabad, where he continued his education. In 1979 he graduated from Buquruslan Civil Aviation School.

=== Personal life ===
Akhundov was married and had two children.

== Nagorno-Karabakh war ==
In 1987, Akhundov returned to Azerbaijan from Riga when the initial conflicts started between Azerbaijan and Armenia. In 1989, he was appointed the first officer of Zabrat “Azalaero” Mi-8 Helicopter Company.

In January 1992, he carried out several flights to Shusha. His aircraft was hit by Armenians on January 28, 1992, during the next Aghdam-Shusha flight.

== Honors ==
Safa Fatulla oghly Akhundov was posthumously awarded the title of the "National Hero of Azerbaijan" by Presidential Decree No. 337 dated 25 November 1992.

He is buried at Martyrs' Lane cemetery in Baku.

== See also ==
- First Nagorno-Karabakh War
- List of National Heroes of Azerbaijan
- Azerbaijani Air and Air Defence Force
- 1992 Azerbaijani Mil Mi-8 shootdown

== Sources ==
- Əbədiyyət yolçuları //Səhər.- 1992.- 27 noyabr.- S.2.
- Əsgərov V. Axundov Səfa Fətulla oğlu //Əsgərov V. Azərbaycanın Milli Qəhrəmanları.- B., 2005.- S.16-17.
- Vüqar Əsgərov. "Azərbaycanın Milli Qəhrəmanları" (Yenidən işlənmiş II nəşr). Bakı: "Dərələyəz-M", 2010, səh. 27–28.
- Qəhrəmanın büstü açılmışdır: [Cəlilabadda] //Azərbaycan.-1996.- 15 may.-S.3.
- Mehdiyev S. Qorxmaz təyyarəçi //Odlar yurdu.- 1993.-11 fevral.- S.2.
- Səfərli M. Qəlblərdə yaşayır: [Şəhid təyyarəçi haqqında]//Azərbaycan.- 1998.- 11 iyul.- S.3.
- Süleymanov M. Sonuncu reys //Süleymanov M. Azərbaycanın səma şahinləri.- B., 1994.- S. 25.
- Şahmar E. İgidə el ağlayar //Şahmar E. Kövrək məhəbbətim Qubadlı.- B., 1994.- S.141-146.
- Zeynalov R. Axundov Səfa Fətulla oğlu: (1958-1992)//Zeynalov R. Azərbaycanın Milli Qəhrəmanları.- B., 1996.-S.11.
