= 1994 Iranian Air Force C-130 shootdown =

Aviation incident

Coordinates: 39°48′55″N 46°45′7″E

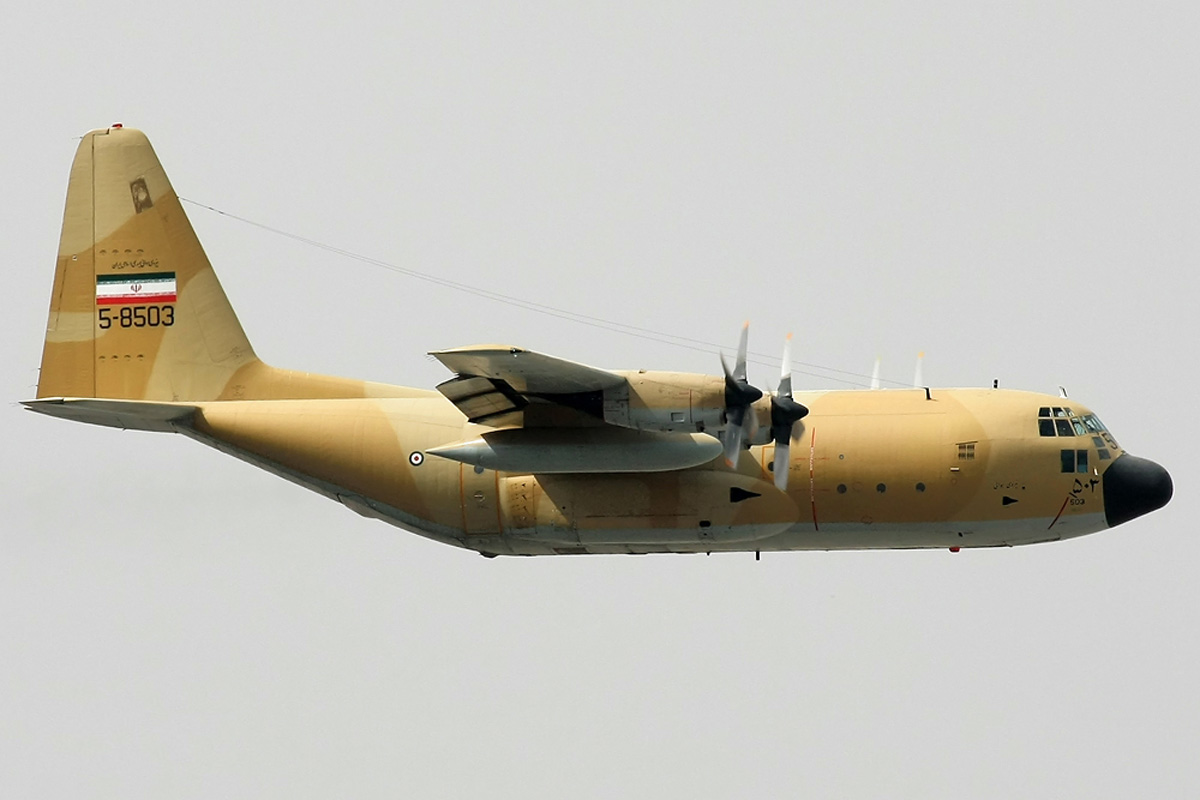
- An Iranian C-130 similar to that involved in the incident

Shootdown
- Date: March 17, 1994
- Summary: Shootdown
- Site: Ballıca, near Stepanakert, Nagorno-Karabakh

Aircraft
- Aircraft type: C-130E Hercules
- Operator: Islamic Republic of Iran Air Force
- Registration: 5-8521
- Flight origin: Moscow, Russia
- Destination: Tehran Mehrabad International Airport, Iran
- Occupants: 32
- Passengers: 19
- Crew: 13
- Fatalities: 32
- Survivors: 0

The 1994 Iranian Air Force C-130 shootdown occurred on March 17, 1994, when an Iranian Air Force C-130E military transport aircraft, carrying Iranian embassy personnel from Moscow to Tehran, was shot down by Armenian military forces near the city of Stepanakert in Nagorno-Karabakh, an area which had been under armed conflict since 1988. The 32 people (19 passengers and 13 crew) on board were killed in the crash.

== Shootdown ==
The C-130 Hercules departed from Moscow, taking relatives of Iranian embassy staff home for Novruz celebrations. The Iranian Embassy in Moscow said the aircraft was carrying 19 passengers, including nine children, and a crew of 13. The crew reported mechanical trouble before veering into and entering the Azerbaijani airspace over the region of Nagorno-Karabakh, where it crashed, killing everyone on board.

Armenia's first deputy foreign minister, Gerard Libaridian, told a news conference that the plane should have flown over Russia, Georgia and Armenia before reaching Iran. However it veered about 65 miles east of this corridor as it left Georgia and did not enter Armenian airspace as scheduled at 10:08 p.m. Instead, it flew into the war zone around Nagorno-Karabakh.

The remains of Iranians killed in the crash were transported to Armenia and flown from the Yerevan's Zvartnots International Airport to Tehran. The ceremony was attended by Armenian Vice-president Gagik Arutyunyan and Vice prime-minister Vigen Chitechyan.

Iran dispatched a special Air Force commission to investigate the causes of the tragedy. The chief of the commission Abdat Aminian dismissed the version offered by Armenian Vice President Gagik Arutyunyan who suggested that the C-130 lost control and plunged to the ground because of some malfunctions of the plane's flight systems. An official of Iran's Foreign Ministry stated that for "some unknown reasons the plane exploded in mid-air, after it veered off course."

Aminian declared that the plane was shot down by two missiles, launched by the Armenian forces. Aminian said that the Armenian side did not assume direct responsibility for the accident, however, it admitted that its troops took the Iranian plane for an Azerbaijani craft, and that the Armenian troops did not try to get in touch with the plane in order to identify it.

The Iranian Foreign Ministry announced the results of the investigation in a statement, which placed the blame for the shootdown with the Armenian forces. The statement said that "Iran reserves the right to take legal action and receive compensations for the victims of the crash, and calls on the Armenian government to identify and punish those guilty of downing the aircraft".

The Azerbaijani National Security Ministry supplied the Iranian side with a radio dispatch that was intercepted by Azerbaijani intelligence on the day of the catastrophe. One of the phrases in the intercepted dispatch was "We have just downed an Azerbaijani military plane". Azerbaijani intelligence claimed that a self-targeting "Osa" missile system was used to down the C-130.

Some Russian military experts suggested that the C-130 intentionally changed its flight course for reconnaissance purposes. However the Iranian Foreign Ministry rejected these allegations.

== Aftermath ==
In a meeting in Tehran with Armenia's vice president, Gagik Arutyunyan, Iranian President Ali Akbar Hashemi Rafsanjani demanded that those responsible for the shooting be punished. Before departing from Tehran, Arutyunyan admitted that the Iranian plane was shot down "by mistake", without specifying who committed the mistake.

In the opinion of Human Rights Watch, "under the rules of war, the Karabakh Armenians would be duty bound to ascertain the nature of the aircraft before firing. If they did not use every available means to identify the aircraft and still fired, this would constitute a serious violation of humanitarian law".

== See also ==
- List of accidents and incidents involving the Lockheed C-130 Hercules
- List of aircraft shootdowns during the Nagorno-Karabakh Conflict
