= List of combat victories of United States military aircraft since the Vietnam War =

This is a list of notable fixed-wing military air combat victories since the end of the Vietnam War grouped by the year that the victory occurred. This list is intended for military aircraft air to air victories during combat.

== Gulf of Sidra incident (1981) ==
- August 19, 1981 – A Grumman F-14A Tomcat (Bureau Number : 160390) shot down a Sukhoi Su-22 using an AIM-9 Sidewinder missile. The F-14 was piloted by Commander Lawrence "Music" Muczynski and Lieutenant JG James "Luca" Anderson.
- August 19, 1981 – A Grumman F-14A Tomcat (Bureau Number : 160403) shot down a Sukhoi Su-22 using an AIM-9 Sidewinder missile. The F-14 was piloted by Commander Henry "Hank" Kleeman and Lieutenant David "DJ" Venlet.

== Gulf of Sidra incident (1989) ==
- January 4, 1989 – A Grumman F-14A Tomcat (Bureau Number : 159437) shot down a Mikoyan-Gurevich MiG-23 using an AIM-7 Sparrow missile. The F-14 was piloted by Lieutenant Hermon C. Cook III and Lieutenant Commander Steven Patrick Collins.
- January 4, 1989 – A Grumman F-14A Tomcat (Bureau Number : 159610) shot down a Mikoyan-Gurevich MiG-23 using an AIM-9 Sidewinder missile. The F-14 was piloted by Commander Joseph Bernard Connelly and Commander Leo F. Enwright.

== Operation Desert Storm (1991) ==
- January 17, 1991 - A McDonnell Douglas F-15C Eagle (Serial Number : 85-107) shot down a Mikoyan-Gurevich MiG-29 aircraft using an AIM-7 Sparrow missile. The pilot was Captain Chuck "Sly" Magill.
- January 17, 1991 - A McDonnell Douglas F-15C Eagle (Serial Number : 85-125) shot down a Mikoyan-Gurevich MiG-29 aircraft using an AIM-7 Sparrow missile. The pilot was Captain Jon "JB" Kelk.
- January 17, 1991 - A McDonnell Douglas F-15C Eagle (Serial Number : 85-119) shot down a Mikoyan-Gurevich MiG-29 aircraft using an AIM-7 Sparrow missile. The pilot was Captain Rhory "Hoser" Draeger.
- January 17, 1991 - A McDonnell Douglas F-15C Eagle (Serial Number : 85-105) shot down a Dassault Mirage F1 aircraft using an AIM-7 Sparrow missile. The pilot was Captain Rob "Cheese" Graeter.
- January 17, 1991 - A McDonnell Douglas F-15C Eagle (Serial Number : 85-105) shot down a Dassault Mirage F1 aircraft when it flew into the ground. The pilot was Captain Rob "Cheese" Graeter.
- January 17, 1991 - A McDonnell Douglas F-15C Eagle (Serial Number : 83-017) shot down a Dassault Mirage F1 aircraft using an AIM-7 Sparrow missile. The pilot was Captain Steve "Tater" Tate.
- January 17, 1991 - A McDonnell Douglas F/A-18C Hornet (Bureau Number : 163508) shot down a Mikoyan-Gurevich MiG-21 aircraft using an AIM-9 Sidewinder missile. The F/A-18 was piloted by Lieutenant Commander Mark I. Fox.
- January 17, 1991 - A McDonnell Douglas F/A-18C Hornet (Bureau Number : 163502) shot down a Mikoyan-Gurevich MiG-21 aircraft using an AIM-7 Sparrow missile. The F/A-18 was piloted by Lieutenant Nick Mongilio.
- January 19, 1991 - A McDonnell Douglas F-15C Eagle (Serial Number : 85-114) shot down a Mikoyan-Gurevich MiG-29 aircraft when it flew into the ground. The pilot was Captain Cesar "Rico" Rodriguez.
- January 19, 1991 - A McDonnell Douglas F-15C Eagle (Serial Number : 85-122) shot down a Mikoyan-Gurevich MiG-29 aircraft using an AIM-7 Sparrow missile. The pilot was Captain Craig "Mole" Underhill.
- January 19, 1991 - A McDonnell Douglas F-15C Eagle (Serial Number : 79-069) shot down a Dassault Mirage F1 aircraft using an AIM-7 Sparrow missile. The pilot was Captain Dave "Spyro" Prather.
- January 19, 1991 - A McDonnell Douglas F-15C Eagle (Serial Number : 79-021) shot down a Dassault Mirage F1 aircraft using an AIM-7 Sparrow missile. The pilot was First Lieutenant David "Abby" Sveden.
- January 19, 1991 - A McDonnell Douglas F-15C Eagle (Serial Number : 85-101) shot down a Mikoyan-Gurevich MiG-25 aircraft using an AIM-7 Sparrow missile. The pilot was Captain Larry "Cherry" Pitts.
- January 19, 1991 - A McDonnell Douglas F-15C Eagle (Serial Number : 85-099) shot down a Mikoyan-Gurevich MiG-25 aircraft using an AIM-7 Sparrow missile. The pilot was Captain Rick "Kluso" Tollini.
- January 26, 1991 - A McDonnell Douglas F-15C Eagle (Serial Number : 85-114) shot down a Mikoyan-Gurevich MiG-23 aircraft using an AIM-7 Sparrow missile. The pilot was Captain Cesar "Rico" Rodriguez.
- January 26, 1991 - A McDonnell Douglas F-15C Eagle (Serial Number : 85-108) shot down a Mikoyan-Gurevich MiG-23 aircraft using an AIM-7 Sparrow missile. The pilot was Captain Rhory "Hoser" Draeger.
- January 26, 1991 - A McDonnell Douglas F-15C Eagle (Serial Number : 85-104) shot down a Mikoyan-Gurevich MiG-23 aircraft using an AIM-7 Sparrow missile. The pilot was Captain Tony "Kimo" Schiavi.
- January 27, 1991 - A McDonnell Douglas F-15C Eagle (Serial Number : 84-027) shot down a Mikoyan-Gurevich MiG-23 aircraft using an AIM-7 Sparrow missile. The pilot was Captain Ben "Coma" Powell.
- January 27, 1991 - A McDonnell Douglas F-15C Eagle (Serial Number : 84-027) shot down a Dassault Mirage F1 aircraft using an AIM-7 Sparrow missile. The pilot was Captain Ben "Coma" Powell.
- January 27, 1991 - A McDonnell Douglas F-15C Eagle (Serial Number : 84-025) shot down two Mikoyan-Gurevich MiG-23 aircraft using an AIM-9 Sidewinder missiles. The pilot was Captain Jay "OP" Denney.
- January 28, 1991 - A McDonnell Douglas F-15C Eagle (Serial Number : 79-022) shot down a Mikoyan-Gurevich MiG-23 aircraft using an AIM-7 Sparrow missile. The pilot was Captain Donald "Muddy" Watrous.
- January 29, 1991 - A McDonnell Douglas F-15C Eagle (Serial Number : 85-102) shot down a Mikoyan-Gurevich MiG-23 aircraft using an AIM-7 Sparrow missile. The pilot was Captain David "Logger" Rose.
- February 2, 1991 - A McDonnell Douglas F-15C Eagle (Serial Number : 79-074) shot down an Ilyushin Il-76 aircraft using an AIM-7 Sparrow missile. The pilot was Captain Greg "Dutch" Masters.
- February 4, 1991 - A McDonnell Douglas F-15E Strike Eagle (Serial Number : 89-0487) shot down a Mil Mi-24 helicopter when it dropped its bomb load of GBU-10 precision guided bombs. The F-15E was piloted by Captain Richard Bennett and Captain Dan Bakke.
- February 6, 1991 - A Fairchild Republic A-10 Thunderbolt II (Serial Number : 77-0205) shot down a Mil Mi-8 helicopter using its GAU-8/A Avenger rotary cannon. The A-10 was piloted by Captain Robert Swain.
- February 6, 1991 - A Grumman F-14 Tomcat (Bureau Number : 162603) shot down a Mil Mi-8 helicopter using an AIM-9 Sidewinder missile. The pilots of the aircraft were Commander Ron McElraft and Lieutenant Stuart Broce.
- February 6, 1991 - A McDonnell Douglas F-15C Eagle (Serial Number : 84-019) shot down two Sukhoi Su-25 aircraft using AIM-9 Sidewinder missiles. The pilot was First Lieutenant Bob "Gigs" Hehemann.
- February 6, 1991 - A McDonnell Douglas F-15C Eagle (Serial Number : 79-078) shot down two Mikoyan-Gurevich MiG-21 aircraft using AIM-9 Sidewinder missiles. The pilot was Captain Thomas "Vegas" Dietz.
- February 7, 1991 - A McDonnell Douglas F-15C Eagle (Serial Number : 85-102) shot down two Sukhoi Su-17 aircraft using AIM-7 Sparrow missiles. The pilot was Captain Anthony "ET" Murphy.
- February 7, 1991 - A McDonnell Douglas F-15C Eagle (Serial Number : 80-003) shot down a Mil Mi-24 helicopter using an AIM-7 Sparrow missile. The pilot was Major Randy "May Day" May.
- February 7, 1991 - A McDonnell Douglas F-15C Eagle (Serial Number : 85-124) shot down a Sukhoi Su-7 aircraft using an AIM-7 Sparrow missile. The pilot was Colonel Rick Parsons.
- February 11, 1991 - A McDonnell Douglas F-15C Eagle (Serial Number : 79-048) shot down a Mil Mi-8 helicopter using an AIM-7 Sparrow missile. The pilot is Captain Mark McKenzie and he shares the kill with Steve "Gunga" Dingee". He is credited with .5 kills.
- February 11, 1991 - A McDonnell Douglas F-15C Eagle (Serial Number : 80-012) shot down a Mil Mi-8 helicopter using an AIM-7 Sparrow missile. The pilot is Captain Steve "Gunga" Dingee and he shares the kill with Mark McKenzie. He is credit with .5 kills.
- February 15, 1991 - A Fairchild Republic A-10 Thunderbolt II (Serial Number : 81-0964) shot down a Mil Mi-8 helicopter using its GAU-8/A Avenger rotary cannon. The A-10 was piloted by Captain Todd Sheehy.

== Operation Provide Comfort (1991-1996) ==
- March 20, 1991 - A McDonnell Douglas F-15C Eagle (Serial Number : 84-0014) shot down a Sukhoi Su-22 aircraft using an AIM-9 Sidewinder missile. The F-15 was piloted by Captain John "Nigel" Doneski.
- March 22, 1991 - A McDonnell Douglas F-15C Eagle (Serial Number : 84-0010) shot down a Sukhoi Su-22 aircraft using an AIM-9 Sidewinder missile. The F-15 was piloted by Captain Thomas "Vegas" Dietz.
- March 22, 1991 - A McDonnell Douglas F-15C Eagle (Serial Number : 84-0015) shot down a Pilatus PC-9 aircraft when it flew into the ground. The F-15 was piloted by First Lieutenant Bob "Gigs" Hehemann.

== Operation Southern Watch (1992-2003) ==
- December 27, 1992 - A General Dynamics F-16D Fighting Falcon (Serial Number : 90-0778) shot down a Mikoyan MiG-25 aircraft using an AIM-120 AMRAAM missile. The F-16 was piloted by Lieutenant Colonel Gary North.
- January 17, 1993 - A General Dynamics F-16C Fighting Falcon (Serial Number : 86-0262) shot down a Mikoyan MiG-23 aircraft using an AIM-120 AMRAAM missile. The F-16 was piloted by First Lieutenant Craig Stevenson.

== Operation Deny Flight (1993-1995) ==
- February 28, 1994 - A General Dynamics F-16C Fighting Falcon (Serial Number : 89-2009) shot down a Soko J-21 Jastreb aircraft using an AIM-120 AMRAAM missile. The F-16 was piloted by Captain Stephen L. "Yogi" Allen.
- February 28, 1994 - A General Dynamics F-16C Fighting Falcon (Serial Number : 89-2137) shot down three Soko J-21 Jastreb aircraft using two AIM-9 Sidewinder missiles and one AIM-120 AMRAAM missile. The F-16 was piloted by Captain Robert Gordon "Wilbur" Wright.

== Operation Allied Force (1999) ==
- March 24, 1999 - A McDonnell Douglas F-15C Eagle (Serial Number : 86-0169) shot down a Mikoyan MiG-29 aircraft using an AIM-120 AMRAAM missile. The F-15 was piloted by Lieutenant Colonel Cesar Rodriguez.
- March 24, 1999 - A McDonnell Douglas F-15C Eagle (Serial Number : 86-0159) shot down a Mikoyan MiG-29 aircraft using an AIM-120 AMRAAM missile. The F-15 was piloted by Captain Mike Shower.
- March 26, 1999 - A McDonnell Douglas F-15C Eagle (Serial Number : 86-0156) shot down two Mikoyan MiG-29 aircraft using an AIM-120 AMRAAM missiles. The F-15 was piloted by Captain Jeff Hwang.
- May 4, 1999 - A General Dynamics F-16C Fighting Falcon (Serial Number : 91-0353) shot down a Mikoyan MiG-29 aircraft using an AIM-120 AMRAAM missile. The F-16 was piloted by Lieutenant Colonel Michael Geczy.

== Operation Inherent Resolve (2014-present) ==
- June 18, 2017 - A Boeing F/A-18E Super Hornet (Bureau Number : 168912) shot down a Sukhoi Su-22 aircraft using an AIM-120 AMRAAM missile. The Super Hornet was piloted by Lieutenant Commander Michael "MOB" Tremel.

== See also ==
- List of combat losses of United States military aircraft since the Vietnam War
