= 1992 Azerbaijani Mil Mi-8 shootdown =

Helicopter incident near Shusha, Azerbaijan

Coordinates: 39°45′30″N 46°44′54″E

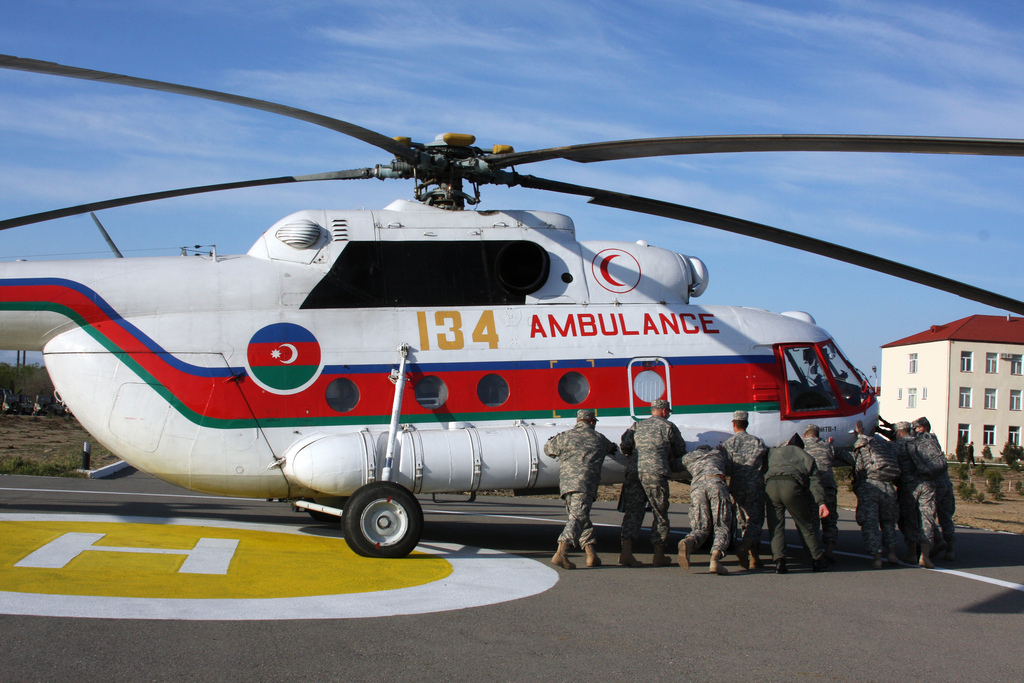
- An Mil Mi-8 similar to the accident helicopter

Shootdown
- Date: 28 January 1992
- Summary: Shootdown
- Site: near Shusha, Nagorno-Karabakh

Aircraft
- Aircraft type: Mil Mi-8
- Operator: Azerbaijani Air Force
- Flight origin: Aghdam
- Destination: Shusha
- Passengers: 41
- Crew: 3
- Fatalities: 44
- Survivors: 0

On January 28, 1992, Azerbaijani transport helicopter Mil Mi-8 was shot down by a heat-seeking missile near the town of Shusha.

The 1993 report by U.S. Federal Aviation Administration on aviation security called it the "most significant incident" involving civil aviation in Central Eurasia.

== Background ==
Serious air warfare during the Nagorno-Karabakh War broke out in January 1992. Azeri aircraft became easy targets for Armenian armed forces. On January 9, the Armenians first claimed to have shot down an Azeri helicopter. More claims followed on January 24, 28 and 31 – all of them over Nagorno-Karabakh, the last being a Mi-8 downed from MANPADs over the village of Huha. On January 31, the Azeris claimed the downings of two Mi-8s that supported the first Armenian offensive.

== Shootdown ==
The Mi-8 helicopter transported 44 persons aboard (41 passengers, all civilians, and 3 crew) when it departed the town of Aghdam for Shusha, which was blockaded by Armenians. The craft was downed en route by a surface-to-air missile. All aboard were killed. According to Azeri journalist Kerim Kerimli, who assisted in collecting bodies at the site and confirmed the number of fatalities, the missile was launched from Xankəndi.

Armenian officials stated that the helicopter was carrying weapons and ammunition to Azeris attacking Armenian villages.

== See also ==
- List of aircraft shootdowns during the Nagorno-Karabakh Conflict
