= List of combat losses of United States military aircraft since the Vietnam War =

This is a list of notable fixed-wing military air combat losses since the end of the Vietnam War grouped by the year that the loss occurred. This list is intended for military aircraft lost due to enemy action during combat. For military aircraft lost due to accidental causes, refer to the list of notable incidents and accidents involving military aircraft. For civil aircraft losses, refer to List of accidents and incidents involving commercial aircraft.

== 1983 (Multinational Force in Lebanon) ==
- December 4 – An A-6E Intruder (Bureau Number 152915) and an A-7E Corsair II (Bureau Number 157468) were shot down by Syrian 9K31 Strela-1 or Strela 2 infrared homing missiles while attacking Syrian army SAM batteries in Lebanon in the mountains east of Beirut. The pilot of the A-6, Lieutenant Mark Lange (flying from USS John F. Kennedy), was killed; his Bombardier/Navigator, Lieutenant Bobby Goodman, ejected and was captured by Syrian soldiers. Lt. Goodman was held for 30 days before his release was facilitated by Jesse Jackson. Lt. Lange's body was returned. From the USS Independence (CV-62), the A-7, Commander Edward Andrews managed to guide his failing Corsair over coastal waters before ejecting; he was rescued by a Lebanese fishing boat and safely returned to the U.S. Marines.

== 1986 (Operation El Dorado Canyon) ==
- April 15 – An F-111F Aardvark (Serial Number 70-2389) was shot down by anti-aircraft artillery (AAA) over Libya. The pilot (Major Fernando L. Ribas-Dominicci) and Weapon Systems Officer (Captain Paul F. Lorence) were killed. Major Ribas-Dominicci's body was returned to the US in 1989. Captain Lorence's body was never found. He is still listed as killed in action, body not recovered (KIA-BNR).

== 1991 (Operation Desert Shield/Desert Storm) ==
- January 17 – An F/A-18C Hornet (Bureau Number 163484) was shot down by an Iraqi Mikoyan-Gurevich MiG-25 in an air-to-air engagement. The pilot, Lieutenant Commander Michael Scott Speicher, of VFA-81 was killed but his body was not found until July 2009.
- January 17 – An A-6E Intruder (Bureau Number 161668) was shot down by a surface-to-air missile over western Iraq. The pilot, Lieutenant Robert Wetzel, and Navigator/Bombardier, Lieutenant Jeffrey Norton Zaun, were captured. They were released on March 3.
- January 17 – An F-15E Strike Eagle (Serial Number 88-1689) was shot down by anti-aircraft artillery (AAA). The pilot, Major Thomas F. Koritz, and Weapons Systems Officer, Lieutenant Colonel Donnie R. Holland, were killed. Their bodies were recovered.
- January 18 – An A-6E Intruder (Bureau Number 152928) was shot down by anti-aircraft artillery two miles from the Iraqi shore after dropping mines on a waterway linking the Iraqi naval base of Umm Qasr with the Persian Gulf. The USN package was engaged by ZU-23-2 ground anti-aircraft guns and Iraqi naval vessels. The pilot, Lieutenant William Thomas Costen and Navigator/Bombardier, Lieutenant Charlie Turner, were killed. Their bodies were recovered.
- January 18 – An OV-10 Bronco (Bureau Number 155435) was shot down by a surface-to-air missile. The pilot, Lieutenant Colonel Clifford M. Acree, and observer, Chief Warrant Officer Guy L. Hunter Jr., were captured. They were released on March 6.
- January 18 – An F-4G Wild Weasel (Serial Number 69-7571) crashed in the Saudi Arabian desert after attacking Iraqi air defenses. An investigation found that a single enemy 23 mm anti-aircraft artillery (AAA) round had punctured the fuel tank, causing fuel starvation. The pilot, Captain Tim Burke, and Electronic Warfare Officer, Captain Juan Galindez, ejected over friendly territory and were rescued.
- January 19 – An F-15E Strike Eagle (Serial Number 88-1692) was shot down by a V-750AK (SA-2E) surface-to-air missile. The pilot, Colonel David W. Eberly, and Weapon Systems Officer, Major Thomas E. Griffith, were captured. They were released on March 6 and March 3 respectively.
- January 19 – An F-16C Fighting Falcon (Serial Number 87-0228) was shot down by a 2K12 Kub (SA-6) surface-to-air missile. The pilot, Captain Harry 'Mike' Roberts, was captured. He was released on March 6.
- January 19 – An F-16C Fighting Falcon (Serial Number 87-0257) was shot down by an S-125 (SA-3) surface-to-air missile. The pilot, Major Jeffrey Scott Tice, was captured. He was released on March 6.
- January 21 – An F-14A+ Tomcat (Bureau Number 161430) was shot down by a V-750AK (SA-2E) surface-to-air missile while on an escort mission near Al Asad airbase in Iraq. The pilot, Lieutenant Devon Jones, was rescued by USAF Special Operations Forces but the Radar Intercept Officer, Lieutenant Larry Slade, was captured. He remained a POW until his release on March 3.
- January 24 – An AV-8B Harrier II (Bureau Number 163518) was shot down by MANPADS. The pilot, Captain Michael C. Berryman, was captured. He was released on March 6.
- January 31 – An AC-130H Spectre (Serial Number 69-6567) was shot down by a surface-to-air missile during the battle of Khafji. The entire crew of 14 were killed. Their bodies were recovered.
- February 2 – An A-6E Intruder (Bureau Number 155632) was shot down by anti-aircraft artillery (AAA). The pilot, Lieutenant Commander Barry T. Cooke, and Navigator/Bombardier, Lieutenant junior grade Patrick K. Connor, were killed. Cooke's body was never found (officially listed as KIA-BNR) and Connor's body was recovered.
- February 2 – An A-10A Thunderbolt II (Serial Number 80-0248) was shot down by an Igla-1 (SA-16) surface-to-air missile. The pilot, Captain Richard Dale Storr, was captured. He was released on March 6.
- February 5 – An F/A-18A Hornet (Bureau Number 163096) crashed in the Persian Gulf. The pilot, Lieutenant Robert Dwyer, was lost over the North Persian Gulf after a successful mission to Iraq. Dwyer served in Carrier Air Wing 8 (CVW-8). His body was never recovered (officially listed as KIA-BNR).
- February 9 – An AV-8B Harrier II (Bureau Number 162081) was shot down by a surface-to-air missile. The pilot, Captain Russell A.C. Sanborn, was captured. He was released on March 6.
- February 13 – An EF-111A (Serial Number 66-0023), callsign Ratchet 75, crashed into terrain while maneuvering to evade a perceived enemy threat, killing the pilot, Captain Douglas L. Bradt, and the Electronic Warfare Officer, Captain Paul R. Eichenlaub.
- February 15 – An A-10A Thunderbolt II (Serial Number 78-0722) was shot down 60 miles northwest of Kuwait city while attacking Republican Guard targets. Thought to have been engaged by a SA-13 Gopher SAM. Pilot Lieutenant Robert Sweet ejected and was taken prisoner. He was released on March 6.
- February 15 – An A-10A Thunderbolt II (Serial Number : 79-0130) Hit by ground fire approximately 60 miles northwest of Kuwait city while attacking Republican Guard targets. Thought to have been engaged by SA-13 Gopher SAM. Pilot Captain Steven Phyllis was killed. Phyllis died while protecting his downed wingman (1st Lieutenant Robert James Sweet). Phyllis' body was later recovered.
- February 19 – An A-10A Thunderbolt II (Serial Number 76-0543) was shot down by a Strela-1 (SA-9) surface-to-air missile 62 nm northwest of Kuwait city. The pilot, Lieutenant Colonel Jeffery Fox (call sign "Nail 53"), was injured as he ejected, captured and held as a POW, until his release on March 6.
- February 22 – An A-10A Thunderbolt II (Serial Number 79-0181) made a wheels up, hard stick landing after being hit by a SAM. The pilot, Captain Rich Biley, brought the aircraft in at King Khalid Military City, Forward Operating Location 1 where it was stripped of parts, some sent to King Fahd International Airport, Main Operating Base for use on other aircraft, and then buried in the desert. Biley was unhurt during the crash-landing.
- February 23 – An AV-8B Harrier II (Bureau Number 161573) crashed when it failed to recover from a high angle dive during a night attack on a tank park in Ali Al Salem, Kuwait, possibly hit by AAA or a MANPAD. The pilot, Captain James N. Wilbourn), was killed and his body was later recovered.
- February 25 – An AV-8B Harrier II (Bureau Number 163190) was hit by MANPADS and crashed while trying to land at Al Jaber airfield, Kuwait. The pilot, Captain Scott Walsh, ejected safely.
- February 25 – An OV-10 Bronco (Bureau Number 155424) was shot down by a surface-to-air missile. The pilot, Major Joseph Small III, was captured and the observer, Captain David Spellacy, was killed. Major Small was released on March 6 and Captain Spellacy's body was recovered.
- February 27 – An AV-8B Harrier II (Bureau Number 162740) was shot down by MANPADS. The pilot, Captain Reginald Underwood, was killed and his body was later recovered.
- February 27 – An A-10A Thunderbolt II (Serial Number 77-0197), call sign Nail 51, crashed after a reconnaissance mission over Kuwait, killing pilot Lieutenant Patrick Olson (posthumously promoted to captain). The aircraft had been hit by a surface-to-air missile and, after losing all its hydraulics, was attempting a landing at King Khalid Military City, Forward Operating Location 1 in Manual Reversion in extreme weather conditions and with only one engine.
- February 27 – An F-16C Fighting Falcon (Serial Number 84-1390) was shot down by an Igla-1 (SA-16) MANPADS. The pilot, Captain William Andrews, was captured. He was released on March 6.

== 1995 (Operation Deny Flight) ==
- June 2 – An F-16C Fighting Falcon (Serial Number 89-2032) was shot down by a Serb 2K12 Kub SAM (NATO reporting name: SA-6 'Gainful') near Mrkonjić Grad, while on patrol over Bosnia. Its pilot, Captain Scott O'Grady, ejected and was later rescued by a USMC CH-53 Sea Stallion helicopter on 8 June.

== 1999 (Operation Allied Force) ==
- March 27 – An F-117 Nighthawk (Serial Number 82-0806) stealth ground-attack jet was shot down by a Yugoslav SA-3 SAM during the Kosovo War. The pilot, Lieutenant Colonel Dale Zelko, survived and was subsequently rescued.
- April 30 – According to some US sources, a second F-117 Nighthawk was damaged by a Yugoslav SAM. The aircraft managed to return to base but supposedly never flew again.
- May 2 – An F-16C Fighting Falcon (Serial Number 88-0550) was shot down by a Yugoslav SA-3 SAM. The aircraft crashed near Šabac, in a rural area of Serbia. The pilot, Lieutenant Colonel David L. Goldfein, future 4 Star General and Chief of Staff of the Air Force, survived and was subsequently rescued.

== 2001–2021 (War in Afghanistan) ==
- September 14, 2012- 1 C-130 Hercules and 8 USMC AV-8B Harrier II aircraft were destroyed by Taliban insurgents during an attack on Camp Bastion. This became the worst U.S. aircraft loss in a single day since the Vietnam War. Two Marines from the VMA-211 were killed in the attack.

== 2003–2011 (Operation Iraqi Freedom) ==
- April 8, 2003 – An A-10A Thunderbolt II (Serial Number 78-0691) was shot down over downtown Baghdad by an Iraqi Roland surface-to-air missile. The pilot survived.

== 2026- (Operation Epic Fury) ==
- March 2, 2026 – Three F-15E Strike Eagles were shot down over Kuwait, accidentally engaged by Kuwaiti air defenses while in active combat with Iranian aircraft, missiles and drones. All six crew members ejected safely according to US Central Command. This was the worst U.S. aircraft loss in a single day since the Afghanistan war.
- March 12, 2026 - Two USAF KC-135Rs, were involved in an apparent mid-air collision over western Iraq in friendly airspace; U.S. Central Command confirmed that one aircraft had crashed, killing all six crew members, while the other was able to safely make an emergency landing.
- April 3, 2026 - An American fighter jet aircraft, F-15E Strike Eagle (call sign Dude 44) was shot down by Iran with a shoulder-fired missile in Southwestern Iran, Iran called for assistance from Iranian civilians in searching for any ejected pilots. An American rescue operation successfully recovered the pilots from Iran. During the operation, an A-10 Thunderbolt was shot down, and two C-130 Hercules and four 4 MH-6 or AH-6 were intentionally destroyed by US forces to prevent them from falling into enemy hands.

== Table ==
Losses per Airframe Type
Airframe	Losses	Operator
A-6 Intruder	4	USN
A-7 Corsair II	1	USN
A-10A Thunderbolt II	8	USAF
AC-130H Spectre	1	USAF
AV-8B Harrier II	5	USMC
EF-111A Raven	1	USAF
F-4G Wild Weasel	1	USAF
F-14 Tomcat	1	USN
F-15E Strike Eagle	5	USAF
F-16C Fighting Falcon	5	USAF
F-111 Aardvark	1	USAF
F-117 Nighthawk	1	USAF
F/A-18 Hornet	2	USN
OV-10 Bronco	2	USAF
Total	34	

== See also ==
- List of aircraft losses of the Vietnam War
- List of combat victories of United States military aircraft since the Vietnam War
