= Vagif Gurbanov =

- Vaqif Qurbanov
- Born: 1967; Baku, Azerbaijan SSR
- Died: 13 June 1992 (aged 24–25); Askeran, Azerbaijan
- Military career
- Allegiance: Soviet Union; Azerbaijan
- Branch: Azerbaijani Armed Forces
- Rank: Senior lieutenant
- Conflicts: First Nagorno-Karabakh War

Vagif Gurbanov (Azerbaijani: Vaqif Qurbanov; 1967, Baku, Azerbaijan SSR – 13 June 1992, Askeran, Azerbaijan) was a USSR Air Force officer during the First Nagorno-Karabakh War (1992) and the first military aviator of the independent Azerbaijani Armed Forces.

== Early life ==
Vagif Gurbanov, originally from Qovlar, Tovuz, Azerbaijan, was born in 1967 in Baku, Azerbaijan.

== Early military service ==
Gurbanov graduated from the Borisoglebsk Higher Military Aviation School of Pilots in Borisoglebsk, Russia. He then served as an officer in the Sitalchay Aviation Regiment of the USSR Air Force and was assigned to an airbase organized during the Afghan war and equipped with Su-25 aircraft. He later served in one of the aviation regiments in Azerbaijan. He participated in the creation of military regiments in Ganja, Yevlakh and Kurdamir.

== First Nagorno-Karabakh War ==
=== Hijacking of the Su-25 military aircraft ===
According to the preliminary plan, Su-25 aircraft on a training flight from the Sitalchay military airport of the CIS Air Force, located at the 80th dislocated air regiment, were to fly to Khojaly and bomb Khojaly Airport. Ministry of Internal Affairs official Akif Hajiyev promised Gurbanov he would be provided with new documents, enabling him to live under a new identity following the mission. However, Gurbanov did not consider this plan to be feasible as the ammunition on board during the training flight would not be sufficient for the mission.

According to the amended plan, on 8 April 1992, Senior Lieutenant Gurbanov hijacked and transferred Su-25 military aircraft to Azerbaijan with the assistance of Azerbaijani fellow countrymen, technical aircraft Lieutenant Fuad Mammadov and Chief Airman Sergeant Akif Guliyev. The Su-25 thus became the first fighter aircraft in the arsenal of the Azerbaijani Air Force. Chief technician Gulbudag Binyatov was also involved in the hijacking. The plane landed at Yevlakh civil airport.

Immediately following the hijacking of the aircraft, special inspection and control measures were instituted. The search crew was tasked with destroying the military aircraft unconditionally and without warning. Therefore, the military aircraft was temporarily hidden under straw at Sheki airport outside the settlements. Gulbudag Binyatov and other aviation experts, involved in the hijacking of the military aircraft, left the Sitalchay military airport just two days later to avoid suspicion.

Although the Russian government demanded the return of the aircraft, the aircraft remained at the airport. The Ministry of Defence of Russia created a special squad consisting of two MiG-23s at Georgia's Vaziani Military Base, to destroy the hijacked Su-25, but could not succeed.

=== Major battles ===
Gurbanov's first aviation assignment was in Shusha, where he operated the first fighter aircraft of the Republic of Azerbaijan for the first time. On 8 May 1992 he began military flights over Shusha. Low-flying aircraft resulted in damage to the aircraft engine. The new engine was purchased from the Georgian Vaziani Military Base, sponsored by Surat Huseynov. On 8 and 9 May, Gurbanov's raid killed 30 soldiers of Armenian armed groups and wounded 120 of them. According to the Armenians' allegations, all the dead were civilians.

On 9 May 1992, Gurbanov attacked an Armenian Yak-40 aircraft flying from Khankendi to Yerevan. Shooting down aircraft made a safe and emergency landing at Sisian airfield with no fatalities. All passengers were evacuated safely and the plane was completely ignited and completely destroyed the aircraft.

On 12 June, a Su-25 aircraft operated by Gurbanov broke down the enemy's defensive line in Shaumyan and resulted in the release of up to 20 settlements from Armenian military units. Gurbanov also participated in the battles around Martuni, the villages of Shosh, and Khramort in the Askeran district, as well as in Chaykand and Ai-Paris. As a result, the opposing party suffered heavy losses.

=== Death ===
On 13 June 1992, Gurbanov conducted three combat flights in the Aghdara-Goranboy area. Around 4:00 – 5:00 pm, his Su-25 aircraft was shot down near Nakhichevanik-Askeran by an Armenian armed forces Shilka anti-aircraft gun. According to witnesses, Gurbanov parachuted from the aircraft, but the enemy fired a SA-14 missile at him from the ground. Battalion Commander Fred Asif's brother, Adalat Maharramov, stated that he saw Gurbanov being shot down and fired upon by the Armenians. Although Azerbaijani forces attacked to rescue Gurbanov, it was too late.

The report of Gurbanov's death was met with joy on the Armenian side. Armenian television has repeatedly shown the remnants of the aircraft.

It was rumored that Gurbanov was actually killed or injured by a landmine. An intelligence team sent to that location returned empty-handed. According to another rumor, he survived and was taken to Aghdam hospital and later to an unknown location. His friend Fuad Mammadov said that he was found wounded at Zabrat Airport. However, none of this information has been confirmed. An investigation was carried out at the instruction of Namig Abbasov, the chairman of the State Commission on Prisoners of War, Hostages and Missing Persons. However, that didn't resolve the issue. As a last resort, family members and Mammadov consulted a psychic and fortune teller. No "visionary" has said that he died. In 1992, he was legally declared dead by Baku City Nizami District Court.

It was proposed that Gurbanov be given the title of National Hero. However, Deputy Prime Minister Surat Huseynov recommended that this be postponed, as this could have adverse consequences for Gurbanov if he was still alive and being held by the Armenians. The issue has not been reconsidered. Gurbanov and his comrades, as well as servicemen involved in the hijacking of Su-25 aircraft, were not given any honorary titles.

== Personal life ==
On 20 April 1991, he married Nazakat Gurbanova. The couple had a daughter: Sevinj. She is also a military officer.

== Legacy ==
In 2014, director Samir Kerimoglu made a film titled I'm back home about the hijacking of a Su-25 fighter aircraft by Gurbanov.
