= List of NATO bombings =

NATO bombings include:

== 20th century ==
- 1994 NATO bombing intervention in Bosnia and Herzegovina, part of Operation Deny Flight
- 1995 NATO bombing intervention in Bosnia and Herzegovina, Operation Deliberate Force
- 1999 NATO bombing of Yugoslavia as part of the Kosovo War
  - 1999 NATO bombing of Albanian refugees near Gjakova

== 21st century ==
- 2007 Helmand Province airstrikes
  - 2010 NATO bombing of Tarok Kolache
- 2011 military intervention in Libya
  - Bab al-Azizia#2011 bombings, rebel capture, and demolition
