= Tašmajdan Park =

Public park and the surrounding urban neighborhood of Belgrade, Serbia

- Ташмајдански парк
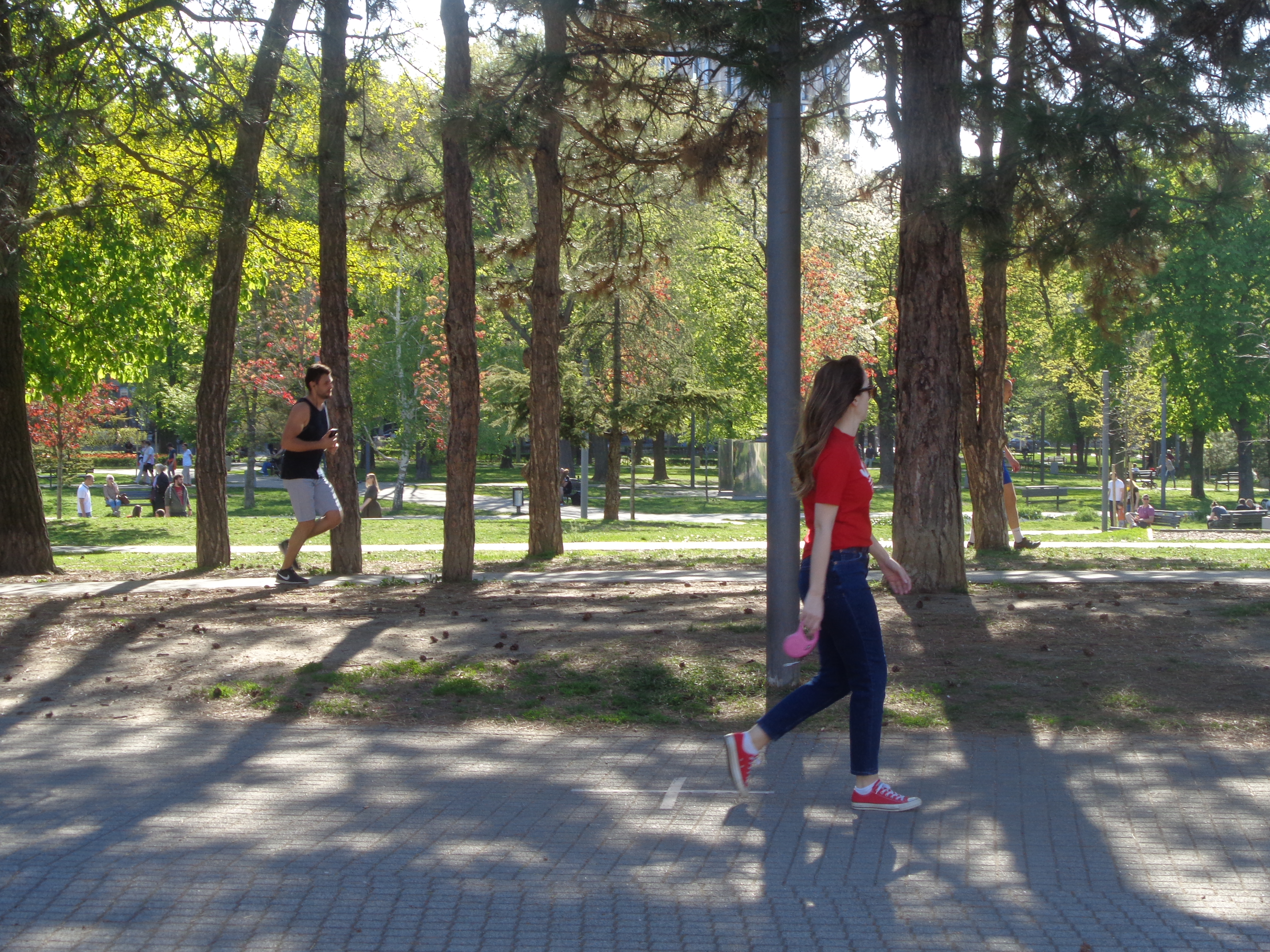
- Tašmajdan Park

- Location within Belgrade
- Location: Palilula, Belgrade
- Coordinates: 44°48.552′N 020°28.246′E
- Area: 9.84 hectares (24.3 acres)
- Created: 1958
- Open: Open all year

Tašmajdan Park (Serbian: Ташмајдански парк / Tašmajdanski park), colloquially Tašmajdan (Serbian Cyrillic: Ташмајдан) or simply just Taš (Serbian Cyrillic: Таш, literally: Tash), is a public park and the surrounding urban neighborhood of Belgrade, the capital of Serbia. It is located in Belgrade's municipality of Palilula.

In 2010–2011 the entire park saw its largest reconstruction since its creation in 1954. In November 2021, the park was declared a cultural monument and placed under protection. With the adjoining faculty buildings, it forms "Tašmajdan and University Center" protected spatial cultural-historical unit.

== Location ==
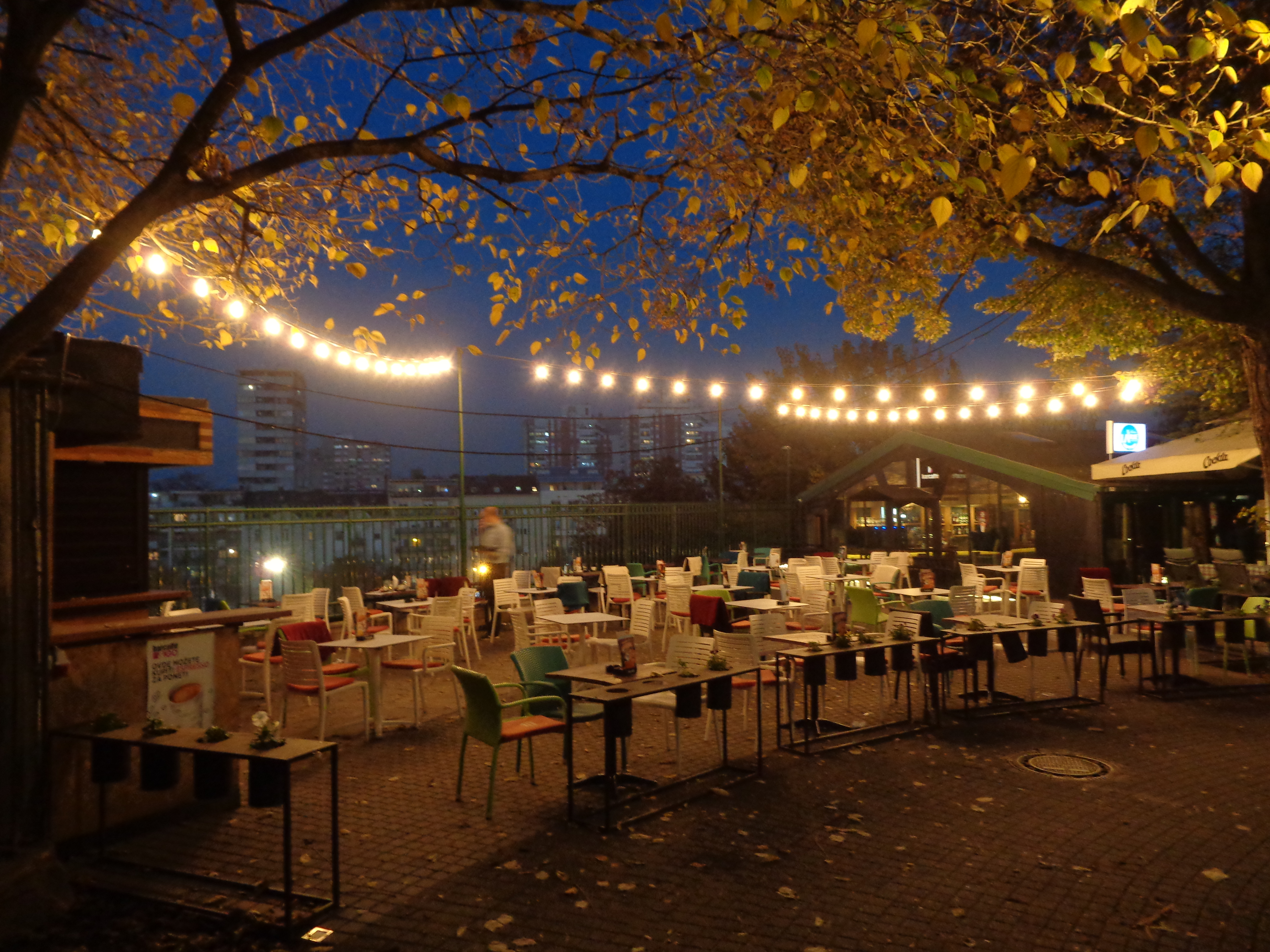
Tašmajdan park

Tašmajdan begins 600 m (2,000 ft) southeast of Belgrade's designated center, Terazije, covering the extreme south-west corner of the Palilula municipality, bordering the municipalities of Vračar on the south and Stari Grad on the west. In a narrower sense, Tašmajdan occupies the area bounded by the streets of Takovska on the north-west, Ilije Garašanina on the northeast, Beogradska on the southeast and Bulevar kralja Aleksandra. The majority of the area is occupied by the park itself (central, east, west) while the northern and extreme western sections are urbanised. In a wider sense, it occupies the additional area to the north (between Ilije Garašanina and 27. marta streets) and east (between Beogradska and Karnedžijeva streets) The latter is also known as Little Tašmajdan. Tašmajdan is bordered by the neighborhoods of Palilula on the northeast, while it extends into the neighborhoods of Vukov Spomenik, Krunski Venac and Nikola Pašić Square on the east, south and west, respectively.

== Administration ==
The neighborhood of Tašmajdan forms a local community (mesna zajednica), sub-municipal administrative unit within Palilula. It had a population of 4,887 in 1981, 4,373 in 1991, 4,018 in 2002, and 3,073 in 2011.

== History ==
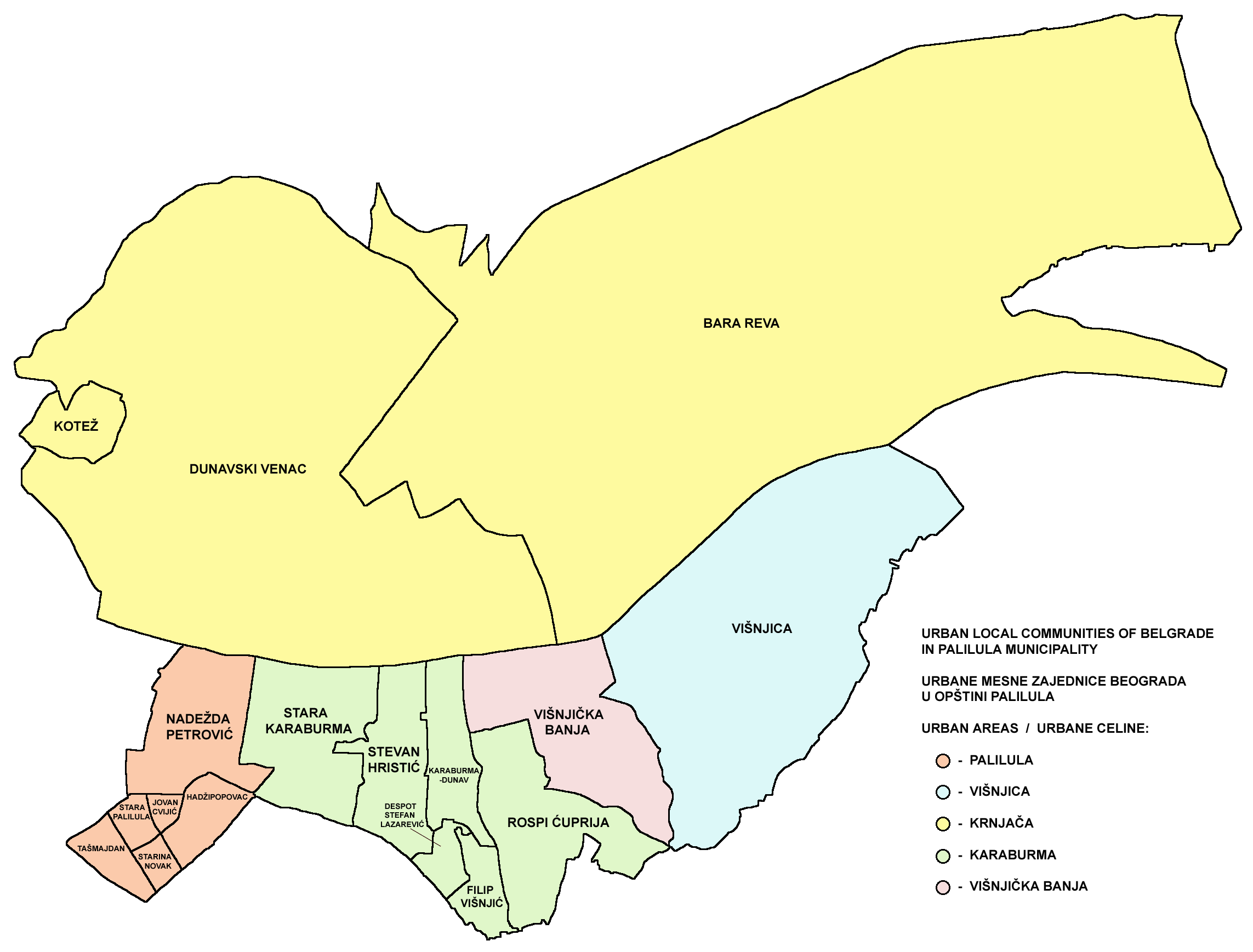
Map of Urban local communities of Belgrade in Palilula municipality

=== Antiquity ===
Almost two millennia ago, Romans were extracting stone from the quarry located in the area for the building of Belgrade's predecessor, Singidunum and for many surviving sarcophagi from that period. It was recorded that the Romans used this stone for the construction of the city's aqueduct in 69 AD. The castrum of Singidunum had tall walls, built from the white Tašmajdan limestone. After the Slavs settled in the area, because of the white stones of the fortress they named the city Beligrad, or "white city".

The quarry remained operational during Ottoman period, thus giving the name to the entire location (Turkish taş, stone and maydan, mine), though it was also used for the extraction of saltpeter by Ilija Milosavljević Kolarac, which was used in the gunpowder production. Due to the proximity to the town, basically all stone buildings and walls in Belgrade from Ottoman period were built from the stone extracted here.

=== Little Vračar ===
Some historians believe that this is the actual place where the remains of the Serbian Saint Sava were burned at the stake on 29 April 1595 by the Ottoman grand vizier Sinan Pasha (area known as Little Vračar) and not the Vračar hill itself or Crveni Krst, another alternative site. Little Vračar (Serbian: Мали Врачар) occupied the area along the Tsarigrad Road, starting from the modern crossroad of the Takovska Street and Bulevar Kralja Aleksandra. Sinan Pasha transported the remains from the Mileševa monastery in the golden casket and later scattered the ashes over Tašmajdan.

When an international congress of Byzantinologists was held in 1927 in Belgrade, some of them gathered with Marko Kuzmanović, a protopope of the Saint Mark Church. As Kuzmanović wrote, based on previous researches, they all took 60–70 steps from the church altar to the east and ended up on the small mound, called Čupina Humka from where both the Sava and the Danube rivers could be seen. Then they told him that this is the exact spot where the remains of Saint Sava were burned. On that spot today is the Poslednja Šansa restaurant. Historians who claim that Tašmajdan is the right location include Jovan Rajić and Sreten Popović.

During the 1717 siege of Belgrade, parts of the battle were in Tašmajdan. Austrian army, headed by Eugene of Savoy, defeated the Ottomans, under the command of Hacı Halil Pasha. The Ottomans suffered heavy losses and had to hand over Belgrade to the Austrians, which kept it under 1739. The locality of Čupina [H]umka itself was named after captain Milija Lešjanin Čupa. He gained prominence in the 1717 fighting but was executed on the future Čupina Humka location in 1725.

=== 19th century ===
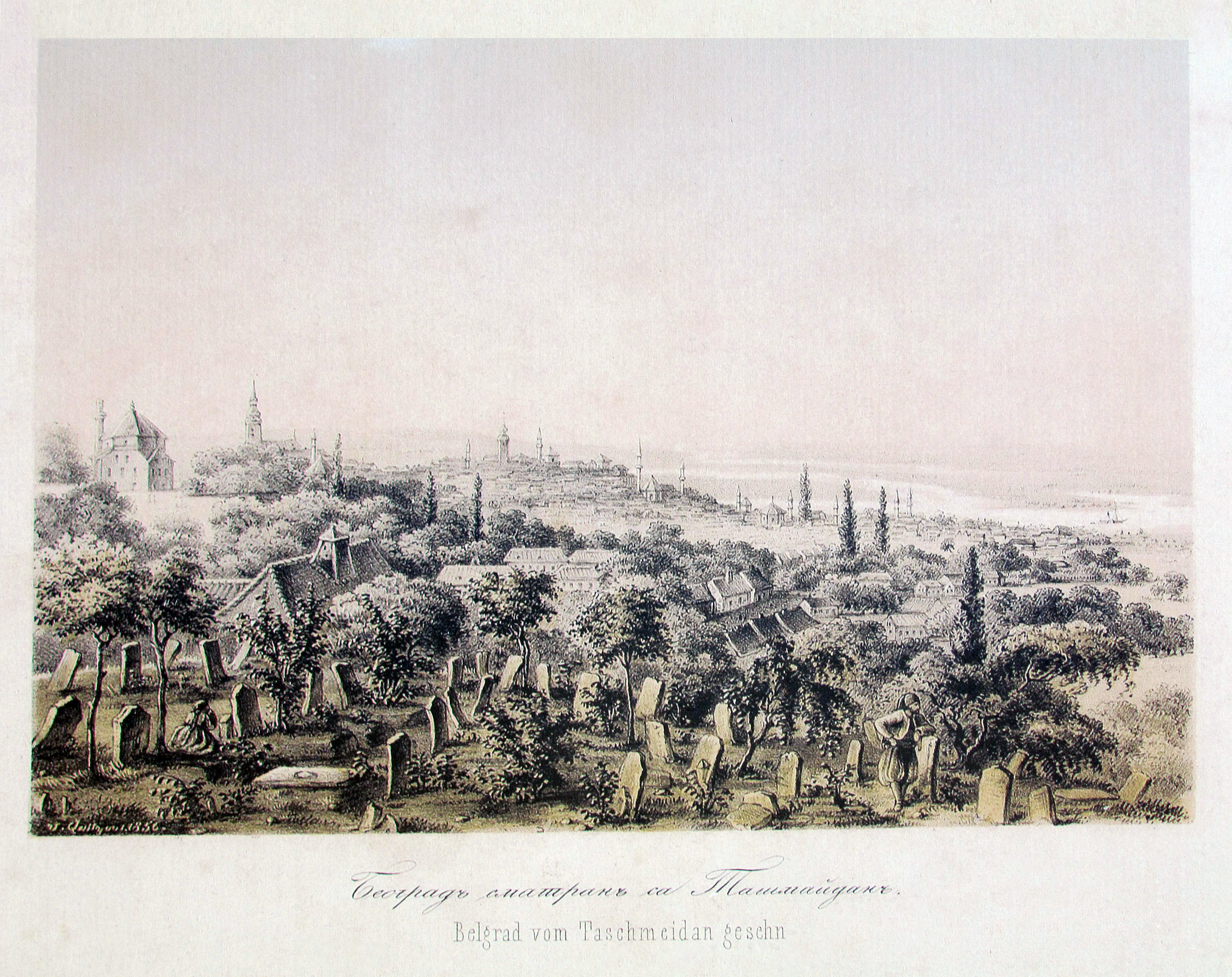
Tašmajdan old cemetery, 1856

During the First Serbian Uprising and the subsequent Siege of Belgrade in autumn of 1806, leader of the Uprising Karađorđe set his camp in Tašmajdan and conducted the liberation of Belgrade from there. He has done so, as from this location, up to the Stambol Gate of the Belgrade Fortress, there was an open field. One of the heroes of the uprising, Vasa Čarapić, was wounded at Stambol Gate and died in Karađorđe's tent in Tašmajdan.

The Čupina Humka mound was used for public reading of decrees and laws. It was here that on 30 November 1830 the Sultan's hattisherif (decree) was publicly announced, declaring autonomy (de facto, internal independence) of Serbia and granting hereditary ruling rights to the Obrenović dynasty.

Ruling prince Miloš Obrenović ordered the relocation of the cemetery to Tašmajdan in 1828 and in 1832, when he decided to build a merchant area along the Sava river, he also relocated the inhabitants of Savamala neighborhood. In the churchyard a school for 35 pupils was built in 1837, which was only the second elementary school in Belgrade at the time. During the Čukur Fountain incident in June 1862, and the subsequent bombardment of the city by the Ottomans from the fortress, thousands of women and children found refuge in Tašmajdan's caves.

Because of the vicinity of the cemetery in Tašmajdan, there were many shops of funeral equipment and stonecutters. Small shops in time evolved into larger facilities, mostly selling old and cheap goods for the poorer citizens. Mostly owned by the Jewish merchants, these second hand shops formed the predecessor of modern flea markets, stretching along the street to the location of modern Law Faculty.

Eastern part of Tašmajdan was a location of one of the first horse tracks in Belgrade. First modern horse races in Belgrade, based on those held in Western Europe, were organized in 1842, by the former British consul-general George Lloyd Hodges. During the reign of prince Mihailo Obrenović, horse races became an annual event since 1862, with prince himself being one of the participants and creator of the rules. He organized three annual races: for the officers, for the public horsemen and for “anyone else who wanted to participate”. But for decades, the city had no regular horse track. Originally, the races were organized in the, at that time, outskirts of Belgrade: eastern Tašmajdan from 1863 (modern Vukov Spomenik neighborhood, close to the University of Belgrade Faculty of Law and Metropol Palace Hotel Belgrade area), and from the 1890s in Marinkova Bara.

==== Cemetery ====
After the successful Second Serbian Uprising when Serbian prince Miloš Obrenović ordered the building of a new town around the old Kalemegdan fortress (Savamala neighborhood), he also ordered that the old Serbian cemetery from Varoš Kapija (near Zeleni Venac) be moved to Tašmajdan, which was done in 1828. New cemetery was intended as "international" contrary to the existing practice, so beside Serbs, it was also the burial place for Hungarians, Germans, Greeks, Italians and French.

In the mid-19th century, near the modern crossroads with the Takovska Street (named Ratarska then), was where city ended at the time, and the fields began. The Batal mosque was located there, giving its name to the developing neighborhood. Kafana Valjevo was located where the Czech embassy is today. At the crossroad was the house of the Savić family, used as a medical facility and across it was the Marić pharmacy. Next to the pharmacy was a curvy road which was leading to the Tašmajdan cemetery. The cemetery wasn't divided into parcels, but had numerous narrow, crossed paths, grown into bushes. This was also the location of Fišeklija, a series of gunpowder stores, where gunpowder was sold in fišeks, cone-shaped bags made from waxed paper. The stores developed in the second half of the 19th century, after Prince Miloš ordered for gunpowder stores to be removed outside of the city due to the safety reasons.

Already in 1880, city newspapers were reporting on the bad condition of the Tašmajdan cemetery. The burial lots were purchased in the Saint Mark's Church, which became quite wealthy, but the cemetery was neglected. Also, as the land was owned by the church, city administration had no interest into arranging the cemetery itself. Part of the cemetery on the side of the Takovska, belonged to the Catholics and the Lutherans. The hill in the direction of modern Seismology Institute was allocated for the graves of soldiers, drowning victims, suicides and non-Christians in general, except for the Jews, who had their own cemetery. Newspapers described the cemetery and the surrounding area as the "shelter for rascals and danglers, who tear the flowers, steal monuments, defile graves with slurs and in other ways, so that cemetery is an abomination of Belgrade where there is no any piety for the deceased".

In the western section of the cemetery the Catholics and Protestants were buried, Serbs on the central promenade, while area around modern Seisomology Institute was left for the soldiers, suicides and drowned ones. In 1835 a small Palilulska church was built. Some of the most important Serbs from this period were buried in the churchyard, including politicians Toma Vučić-Perišić and Stojan Simić and Stevan Knićanin, philologist Đura Daničić, botanist and first president of the Serbian Academy of Sciences and Arts Josif Pančić and philanthropist Ilija Milosavljević Kolarac. Belgraders protested because new cemetery, built on an inhabited fields, gardens and vineyards was away from then downtown, but already in the 1850s, the area surrounding the cemetery was completely urbanized.

Also, as the city expanded, cemetery became inadequate. One the one side, it became too small for the function of the city's main graveyard. On the other, once projected to be on the outskirts of the city, as Belgrade grew, Tašmajdan practically became downtown and close to the Royal court. The first official initiative for the removal of the cemetery came in 1871 from Mihailo Jovanović, Metropolitan of Belgrade. As the city was in the financial crisis at the time and was not able to buy such a large lot for the new cemetery, mayor of Belgrade Vladan Đorđević donated a patch of his land to the city for the purpose of establishing a new cemetery. City government officially obtained land in 1882 and gradual restriction of burials was conducted until it was fully closed 1901. It was moved to the newly built Belgrade New Cemetery, several blocks to the east, beginning from 1886 and the moving was finally completed in 1927 with park being planted instead of the old cemetery. However, many bodies from older periods were not moved and remained below the park.

As many weren't relocated because they had no surviving family members. or their families weren't interested or solvent enough to pay for the relocation, city administration was left with the large number of tombstones. Some of the stones and bricks were sold, earning nice income to the city, but still, many remained. Administration decided to reuse them for construction works around the city. The stones were used for the 1927-1928 works on the Belgrade Fortress (pathways around the Big Staircase in Kalemegdan Park which connected it to the fortress' Lower Town, parts of the Pobednik's pedestal), for the partial paving of the Ruzveltova Street and for the construction of the Tašmajdan pathway between the churches of Saint Mark and Holy Trinity. Belgrade chronicler Zoran Nikolić labeled the fortress path, made of the tombstones turned with the inscribed sides down, Path of the "Former" Deceased.

This was the usual practice in the Balkan history in general (the old, reused materials are called spolije) as there are numerous Greek, Roman and Byzantine remains in the region. Still, citizens protested when former tombstones were used for the works on the fortress. One of the stone benches was made in such a manner, that the name of the deceased, Aksentije Jovanović, was clearly visible, together with the carved cross and skull and crossbones.

=== 20th century ===
On the horse race track, a football match was held in 1915, before the German-Austrian attack, between the gunners from the Allied nations (Russia, Great Britain and France) and the Serbian team made of the players from the teams BSK, Velika Srbija and Soko. BSK had its own court nearby, on the location of the modern Belgrade University Library. During the Interbellum, King Alexander Karađorđević had an idea of building a catholic church in the Ilije Garašanina Street, next to the First Female Realschule. He intended to build it above the former quarry, where the modern stadium is, as an edifice "monumental like Vatican cathedral of Saint Peter and beautiful like basilica Sagrada Família in Barcelona". The project was never realized.

The Belgrade's first general urban plan, adopted in 1923 and approved in 1924, envisioned construction of the city's municipal hall at the crossroads of the boulevard and Takovska, but the Main Post Office Palace was built instead. The post office itself was to be built on the lot next to this one, but it turned out it was a church land. So the post office was built on the neighboring lot, though completely following the design from the plan, while the Church of Saint Mark was later built on the church parcel planned for the post office. The plan also included the Ministry of the Foreign Affairs Building in Tašmajdan itself, but it wasn't built either.

A tennis court was located on Tašmajdan during World War II. As basketball was played on the clay at the time, local guys began playing basketball there. In 1942–44, a group of 4 players was formed: Bora Stanković (1925), Aleksandar Nikolić (1924–2000), Radomir Šaper (1925–98) and Nebojša Popović (1923–2001). After the war, the group became founding fathers of the "Yugoslav school of basketball". Later, Stanković became secretary general of FIBA, Nikolić was a coach, labeled the "Father of Yugoslav basketball" while Šaper and Popović turned to administrative positions. All four are FIBA Hall of Fame inductees.

After the war, new Communist authorities planned to build a massive building of Arts Museum in Tašmajdan. An architectural design competition was organized in 1948, which was won by Nikola Dobrović, but then it was decided his design is "formalist, excessively massive, and fortress-like". Miladin Prljević was given the task of reducing the project, so he downsized it from five huge buildings to two, one to exhibit paintings and sculptures, and the other for medieval collection. This was still deemed too expensive and it was decided to form a park instead. The construction of the park began in 1950 and the opening ceremony was held in May 1954. The seedlings were transported by the horse wagons from the nursery gardens in Krnjača and from Zagreb's Forestry Faculty.

In 1961, the first olympic-size swimming pool in Belgrade was built in Tašmajdan, within the complex of the sports center. At the time, the complex also included Belgrade Tennis Club, amusement park, "Avala" cinema, Fire Brigade and its fire lookout tower.

Since the 1970s, venues in Tašmajdan became some of the most popular hotspots of Belgrade's night life. In 1971, "Cepelin" ("Zeppelin"), the best and the most famous disco in Yugoslavia was opened. It was located at 28 Ilije Garašanina Street. Its opening was described as the "rushing off" of the Belgrade night life. At the opening night, almost all of the state and military top officials and members of the diplomatic corps, were present. The caviar was served from the Josip Broz Tito's plates. At the peak of its popularity, "Cepelin" had 10,000 members. It had three dance floors, state of the art sound system and the interior was patterned after the famed London club "Lavalbon": floors covered with the black artificial leather, dominant brass ornaments, luxurious séparées, plush covered armchairs, twenty different types of mirrors, one thousand colored lightbulbs, and strobe lights above each dance floor. It also had blacklights, projector which emitted psychedelic music videos on the walls which were mostly black. The rooms were stuffy and the colors of the lights changed depending on the DJ who was working that night. Parts of the walls and furniture were in red, with colorful flower prints. The club was located next to the Fifth Gymnasium and sponsored by the Tašmajdan Sports and Recreation Center. It was opened by Saša Nikolić and had working hours of 16:00–21:00 (matinée, for the minors) and 21:00–24:00, for adult visitors, with strict rules on not allowing the minors to stay during the later program. DJs, including Saša Radosavljević and Raša Petrović, were located in the glass booth above the dance podium. It was renovated and expanded in the mid-1970s and included live performances from the most popular Yugoslav rock bands. Most frequent performers was Korni Grupa. "Cepelin" was closed in 1980.

In the 1980s, "Taš" replaced "Cepelin". The club had the so-called "Chivas booths", which introduced whiskey as a symbol of prestige in the Belgrade's night life. Popular venues in the 1990s included "Bus" (in the park, close to the stadium, located in a small edifice which extended from the real derelict bus) and "Pećina" (situated at the entry into the lagums, and in the lagums themselves. It hosted the "Ovo je moj grad" festival).

==== 1999 NATO bombing ====
Tašmajdan was bombed again during the 1999 NATO bombing of Serbia when several objects in Tašmajdan park were badly hit:

- 23 April 1999 – At 2:06 NATO aircraft struck with missiles the building of the Serbian Broadcasting Corporation (RTS) situated in Tašmajdan park. Part of the building collapsed, trapping people who were working in the building that night. Sixteen people were killed while many were trapped for days. The building of the Russian church nearby was also seriously damaged.
- 24 April 1999 – A children's theatre "Duško Radović" in the heart of Tašmajdan park was badly damaged due to its close proximity to neighbouring buildings that were bombed.
- 30 June 1999 – A heart-like shaped monument was erected by the city of Belgrade for all the children that have died in the bombing. The monument says "We were just children" in English and Serbian.
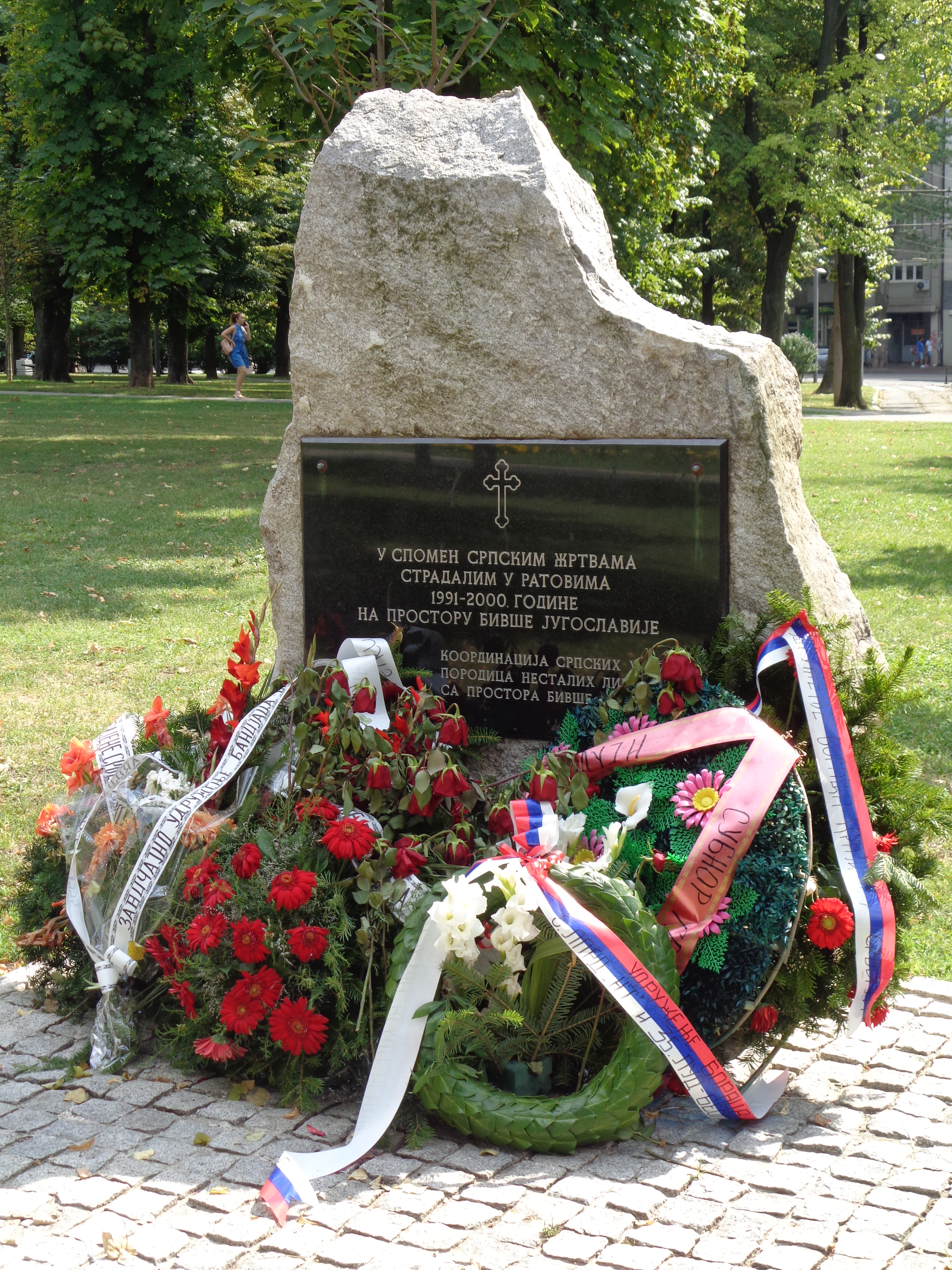
Monument for Serbian war victims 1991-2000

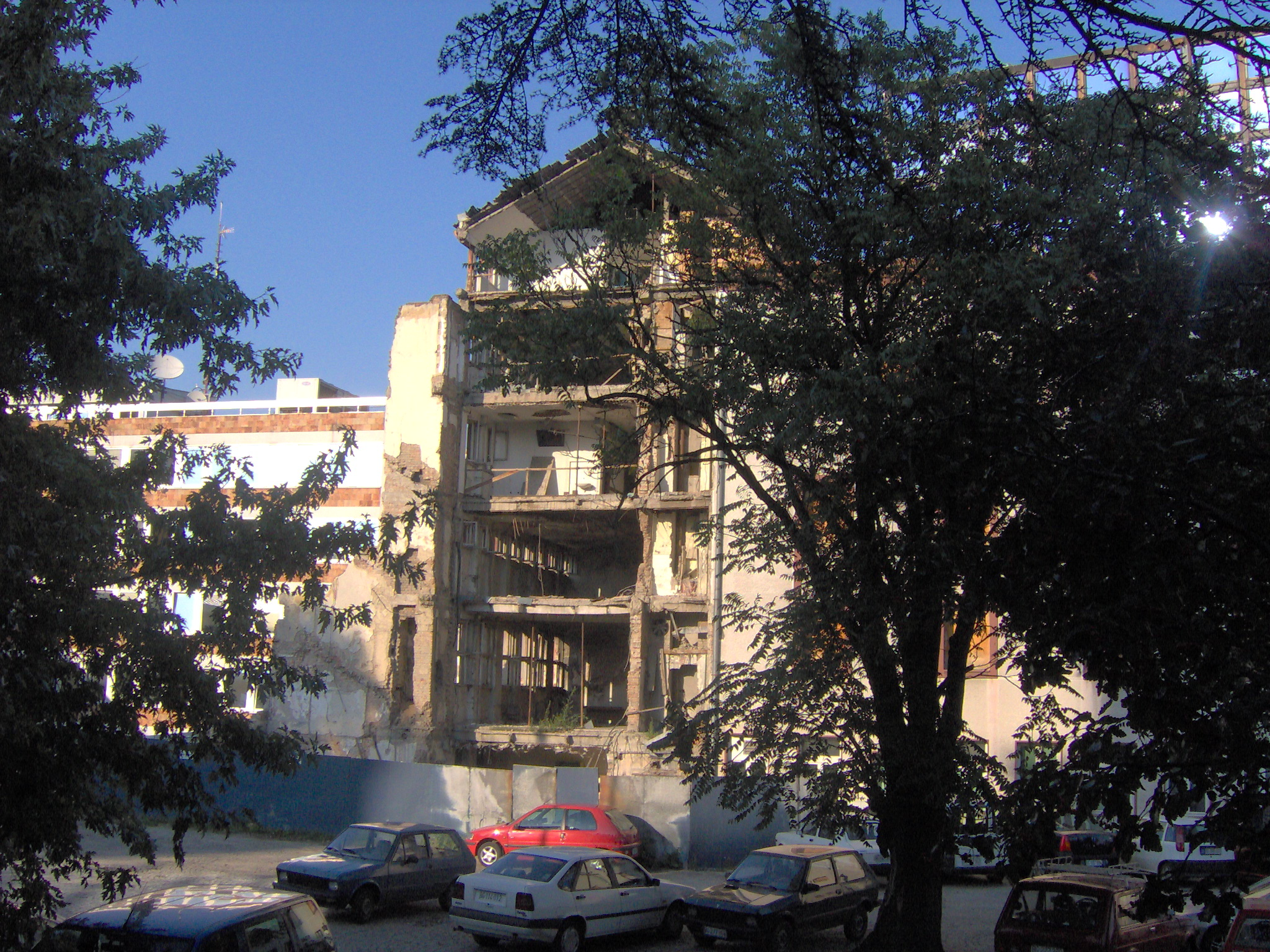
The bombed RTS building still stands in this condition to date (5 October 2005)

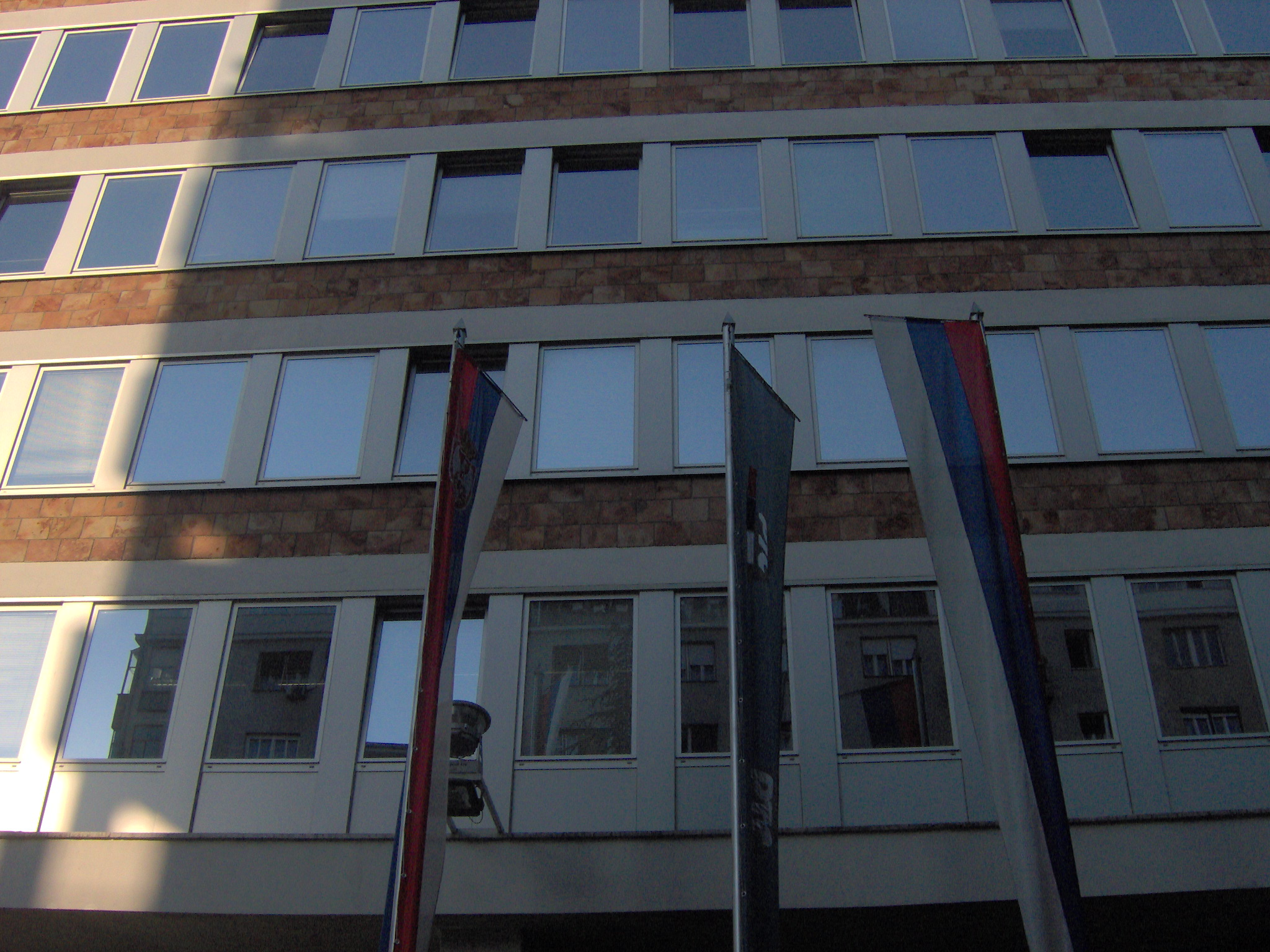
New building of RTS also located in Tašmajdan

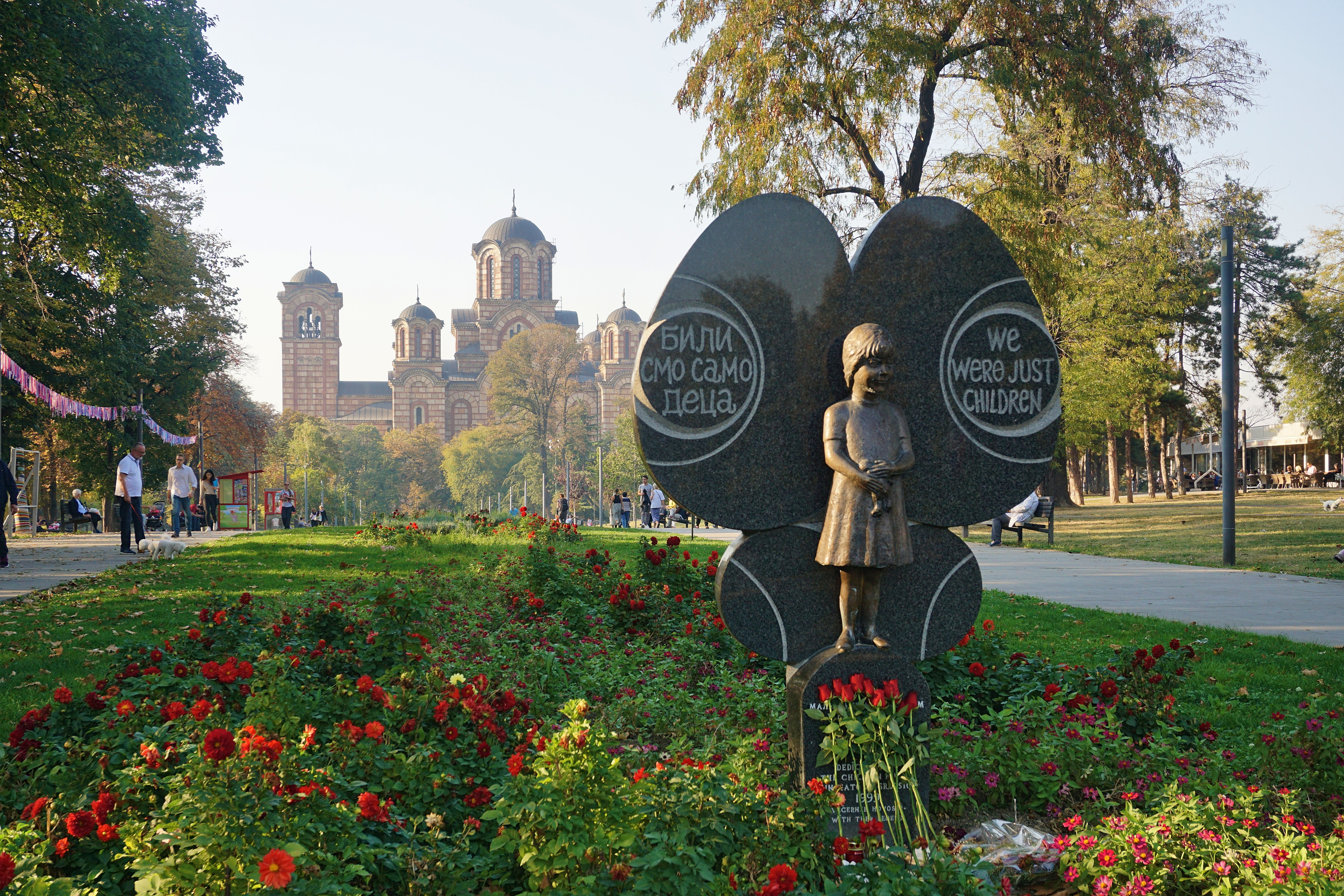
Monument to children that have died during the NATO bombing campaign (located in the centre of Tašmajdan park)

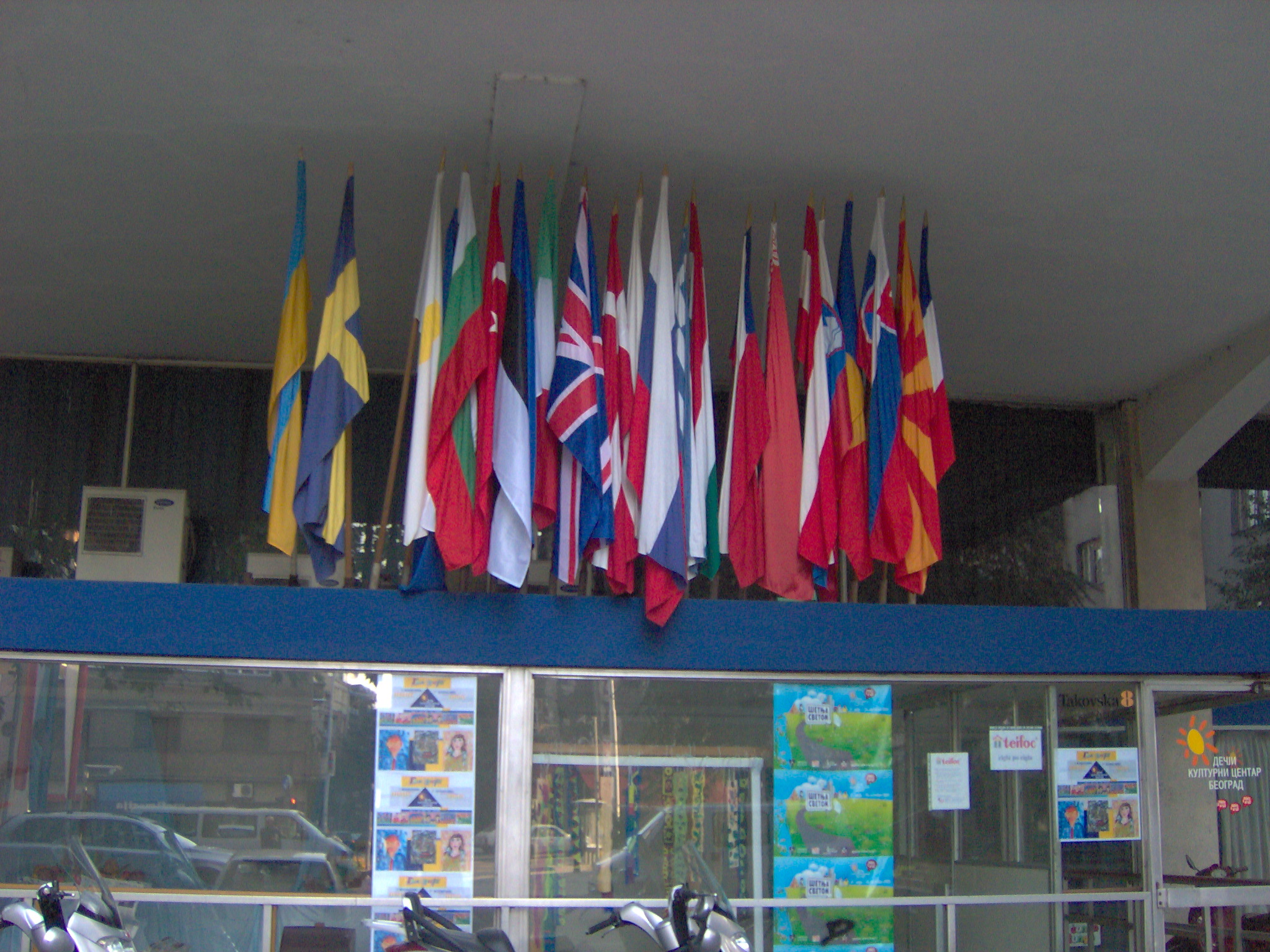
The theatre which was badly damaged during the bombing—now displaying flags of Europe for the "Joy of Europe" dancing contest

The rubble was removed but the ruined section of the building was left as it is. A small memorial was placed in the park, called "Why?" (Zašto?). City administration proposed architectural-urban complex, even an underground garage, but family members of the victims rejected it. City conducted a design competition in 2013, with 40 applicants, selecting a design by the "Neoarhitekte" bureau (Snežana Vesnić, Vladimir Milenković, Tatjana Stratimirović). The project included conservation of the remaining ruins, and creation of one continuous "discretely symbolic" and "suggestively poetic" memorial complex with the existing "Why?" memorial. Though never officially abandoned, the project never materialized. Family members of the victims opposed to the stipulation in the competition that memorial text will blame only the NATO and not the executives of the television (then general manager Dragoljub Milanović served 10 years for not relocating the workers in time). Officially, the problem is due to the ownership issues, as some lots are owned by the city, and some by the state, so the project got lost in the bureaucracy.

=== 21st century ===
Urbanists drafted a detailed regulatory plan for the park in 2001. They concluded that both restaurants (Madera and Poslednja Šansa) and a group of houses across the Law Faculty, shouldn't be in the park area. The only edifice which is completely surrounded by the park, and which should be preserved, was the Seismology Institute (churches are located at the edges of the park). Still, it was decided that nothing will be demolished, that nothing can be built in the park, that existing edifices will be kept "as long as they stand" and that they can't be enlarged and annexed, either in width or height. While Poslednja Šansa was described as a small object, while Madera was described by the urbanists as the "boil" in the park. In October 2019, under suspicious conditions, the leaseholder of Poslednja Šansa since 1991 was expelled and Predrag Ranković Peconi, controversial business figure who has been acquiring hospitality venues in Belgrade in the past two decades, was announced as the new tenant. Sports Center, which owns the venue, claims the name will be preserved and the statue of poet Vasko Popa will be erected in the restaurant's yard.

In June 2010, it was announced that the park will be completely reconstructed as a gift of Azerbaijan to Belgrade. The park has been reopened in June 2011 after throughout renovation, including the installation of a coloured fountain broadcasting classical music. As a sign of gratitude Belgrade has erected a monument to the former president of Azerbaijan Heydar Aliyev in the park. Reconstruction included the rebuilding of the paths, removal of sick trees and planting of new ones, construction of two children playgrounds and a special area for the pensioners. Two public toilets and park infrastructure were renovated, the video surveillance system was installed and the statue of the writer Milorad Pavić was erected. The star-shaped fountain, patterned after a similar one in Barcelona, was closed in 2020, and fully renovated by September 2021.

As of 2013, Tašmajdan Park had 1,100 individual trees from 61 different species and covered and area of 11 ha (27 acres).

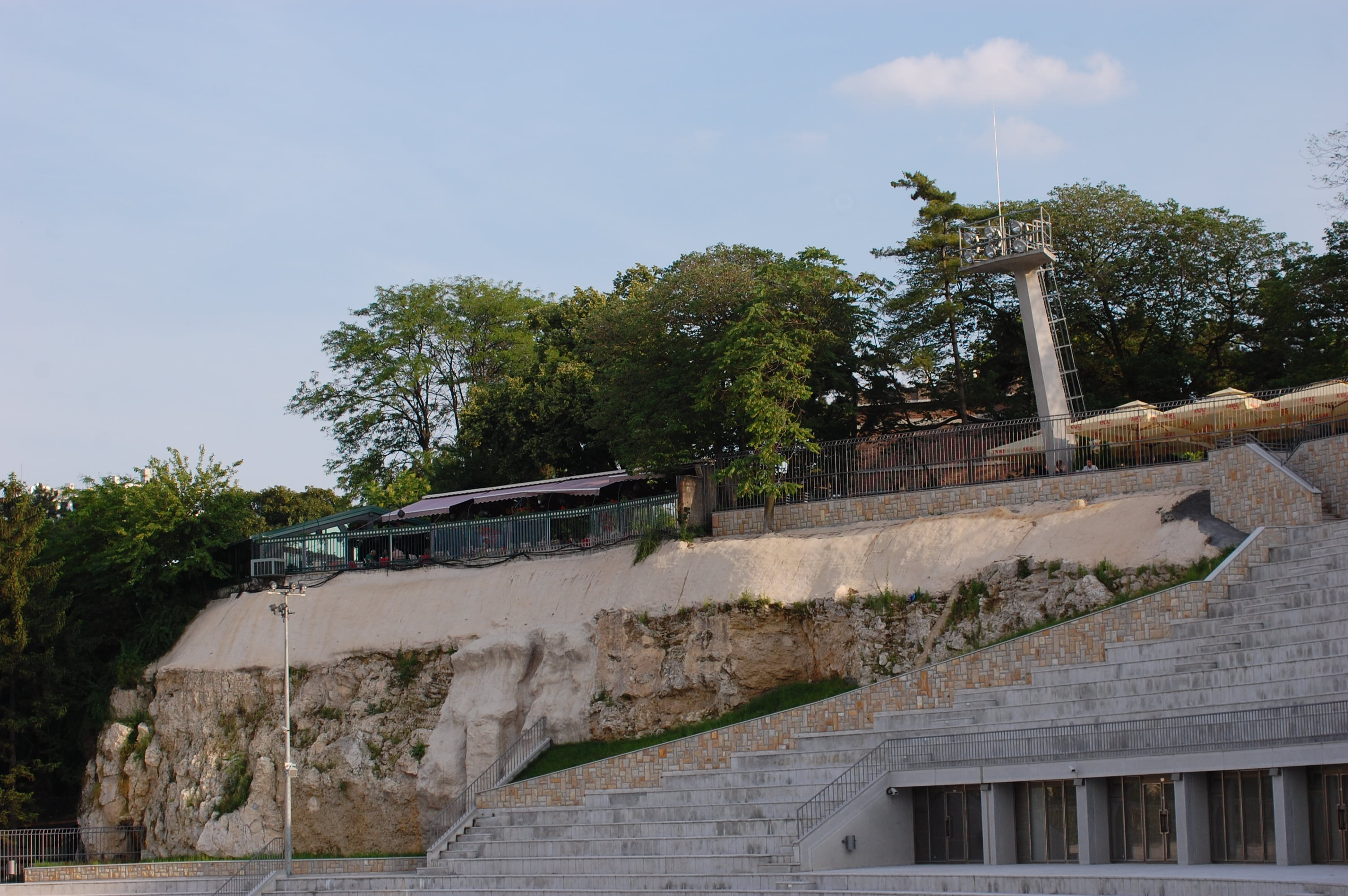
The Miocene ridge in Tašmajdan

In November 2017 a complete rearrangement of the plateau, which functioned as an extension of the Tašmajdan Park in front of the Church of Saint Mark began. Old asphalt pavement which served as a parking lot was removed. Architect Jovan Mitrović designed a new, leveled combination of granite slabs and green areas. The plateau was divided in two sections, left and right, separated by the green island. The right, "ceremonial" side was regularly shaped, with the granite slabs posted in the horizontal rhythm, interrupted with the thin squares of red Italian granite. The design is patterned after the façade of the Michelangelo's temples on Capitoline Hill in Rome. The left side has "disheveled" pattern, made of differently sized and combined granite slabs. The plateau was finished in February 2018.

In June 2018 it was announced that a monument to Patriarch Pavle, head of the Serbian Orthodox Church from 1990 to 2009, will be erected on the green area between the newly finished plateau and the tram stop in Tašmajdan Park. The 1.8 m (5 ft 11 in) tall bronze monument was authored by Zoran Maleš. It was placed in the park on 13 November 2018 and dedicated on 15 November, an anniversary of Pavle's death. Maleš said that he wanted to show the etherealness of Pavle, who was deemed among Serbs as the "walking saint". He also added that he was influenced by the photos of patriarch commuting by the trams – it showed his mundane approach to life, using the public transportation, and he indeed often travelled to this spot when he was visiting the Church of Saint Mark. However, the sculpture of the patriarch in the sitting position, but without a chair, throne or anything that he is sitting on, garnered negative public reaction. The Serbian Orthodox Church said that this is a public monument and that they will not judge it, but that it plans to erect a proper, monumental sculpture of Patriarch Pavle in the churchyard of the Rakovica Monastery, where he was buried.

Right across the park, at the corner of the Resavska Street and Bulevar kralja Aleksandra, a memorial plaque in memory of assassination of Galip Balkar (1937-83), Turkish ambassador to Yugoslavia, was unveiled on 8 October 2019. Assassination occurred on 9 March 1983 and the plaque commemorates both the ambassador, and student Željko Milivojević, who was also killed by the assassins while trying to apprehend them. In July 2020 city announced erection of the monument to novelist Miloš Crnjanski in the park's main alley. The sculpture, sculptured by Miloš Komad, was selected in March 2022.

== Landmarks ==
=== Protection ===
With the surrounding area, Tašmajdan forms the cultural-historical complex Old Belgrade (Stari Beograd), while the park itself is in the zone of the protected natural area of Miocene Sandbank-Tašmajdan (Miocenski sprud-Tašmajdan). The protected geological natural monument was established in 1968, and after the revision and reconfirmation in 2021, today covers 2.46 hectares (6.1 acres). It is placed in the category III of protection. Exposed cliffs from the Miocene period show layers from the period of existence of the ancient Pannonian Sea. The exposed sandbank in the north and northeast section of the park, consists of three sections. The most recognizable section is seen from the western stands of the Tašmajdan stadium. Section 2 is below the stadium, while the third section includes caves (see Underworld section below).

The ridge extends all the way to Kalemegdan, ending with cliffs above the mouth of the Sava into the Danube. It consists of the Badenian limestone layers on top of the Lower Cretaceous Urgonian Limestone. This type of limestone became known as lajtovac. It is rich in fossils, which include seashells, sea snails, and sea urchins.

=== Churches ===
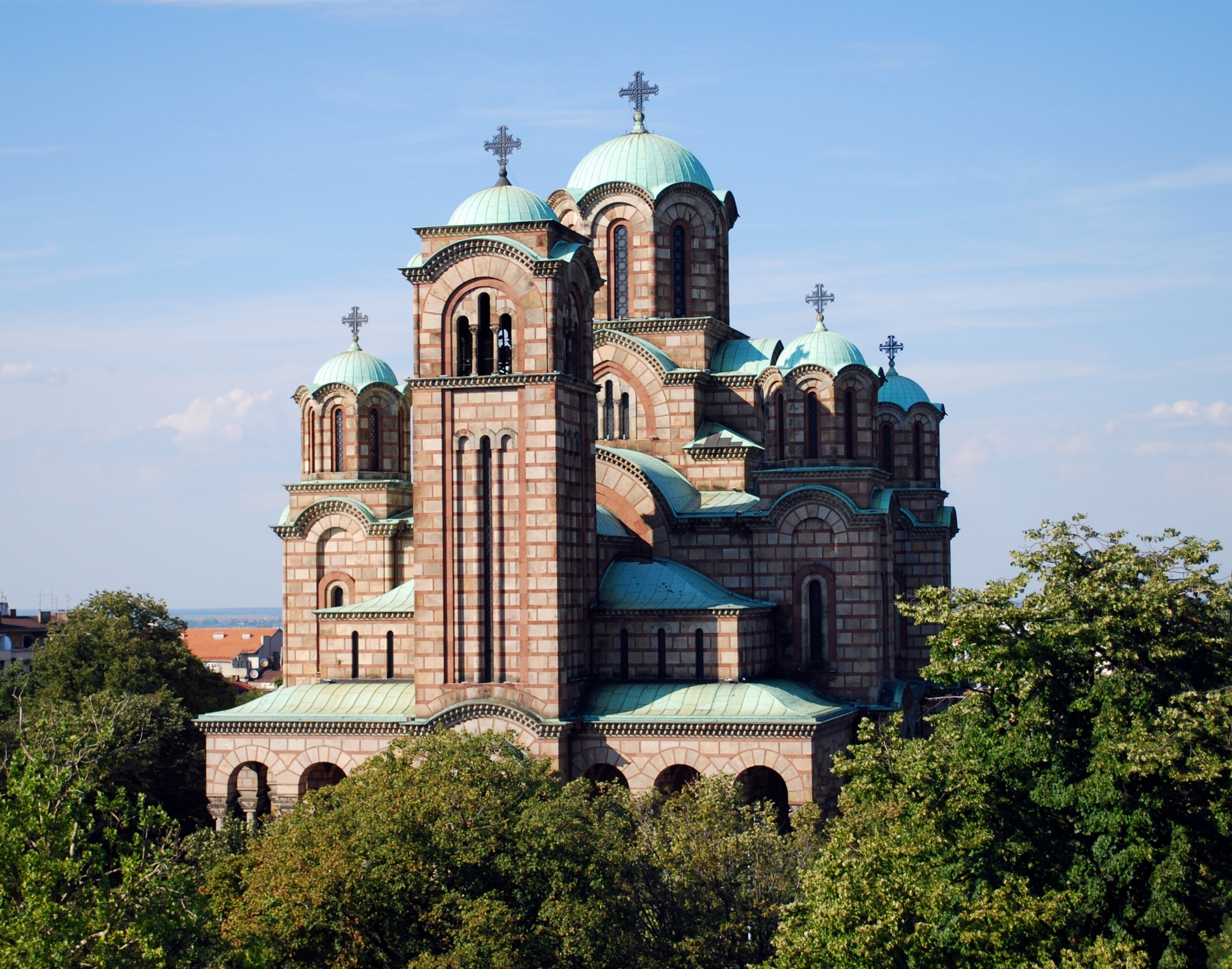
Church of Saint Mark rising above the park

Small Palilulska church (church of Palilula) was built in 1835. It was destroyed in the German bombing of Belgrade on 6 April 1941. The Serbian Orthodox Church of Saint Mark was built in 1931–1940, in the medieval Serbo-Byzantine style, patterned after the Gračanica monastery. The Serbian Emperor Stefan Dušan is buried inside, along with the Serbian Patriarch German. Next to it is a small Russian Orthodox church of the Holy Trinity, built in 1924, inside of which the Russian general Pyotr Wrangel is buried.

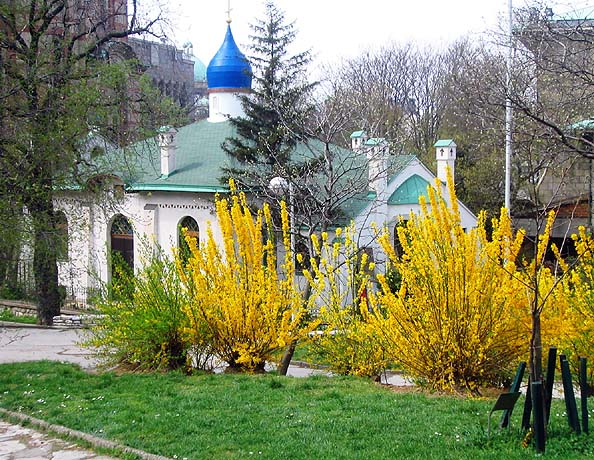
Russian Orthodox Church of the Holy Trinity in Tašmajdan park

=== Sports complex ===
Within the Tašmajdan park a sports complex of Tašmajdan Sports Centre is located. Centre administers several facilities located outside Tašmajdan, like "Pionir Hall" and "Ice Hall". However, swimming pools are located in the park. The outdoor swimming pool was built in 1959–1961. Its dimensions are 50 x 20 meters; its depth varies between 2.2 and 5.0 meters; its capacity is 3,500 m³ and 2,500 seats. Next to the big one, there is a small swimming pool for children. Altogether, there is enough room for 4,000 people. It is equipped for international day-and-night competitions in swimming, water polo, water diving, etc. and also used for certain cultural venues or as an outdoor cinema during summer. It was one of the venues for the 2006 Men's European Water Polo Championship and one of the venues of the 2009 Summer Universiade in July 2009, the event for which the pool was renovated. The indoor swimming-pool was built in 1964–1968 and open for public on 17 February 1969. Its dimensions are 50 x 20 meters and depth is between 2.2 and 5.4 meters; its capacity is 3,700 m³. The swimming pool is surrounded with four diving boards – 1, 3, 5 and 10 meters high and 2,000 seats. It is equipped with underwater light. At −16 °C, water and air can be heated up to 28 °C.

Some of the best known happenings in the venue include: EuroBasket Women 1954, first Miss Yugoslavia contest in 1957 (won by Tonka Katunarić), 1957 World Women's Handball Championship, concerts of Alexandrov Ensemble in 1958 and later in the 1960s and 1970s of Mazowsze, Ray Charles and Tina Turner and ice hockey matches with over 10,000 spectators.

=== Seismology Institute ===
After an earthquake hit Svilajnac in 1893, one of the strongest ever in Serbia, instigated by the geologist Jovan Žujović, the Geology institute of the Great School began collecting data on earthquakes. After the Great School was transformed into the University of Belgrade in 1905, the university established the Seismology Institute in 1906 and proposed the location of Tašmajdan. First seismographs were installed in 1909 and the first earthquake was recorded in June 1910. Seismology Institute was officially part of the University of Belgrade until 1995, but is still located in Tašmajdan.

=== Other ===
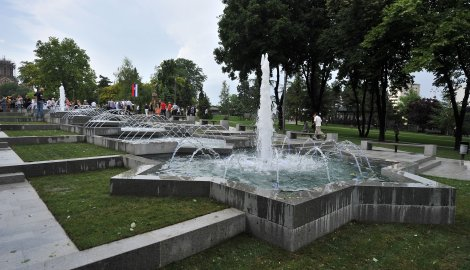
Tašmajdan's fountain with monument to Milorad Pavić and Heydar Aliev

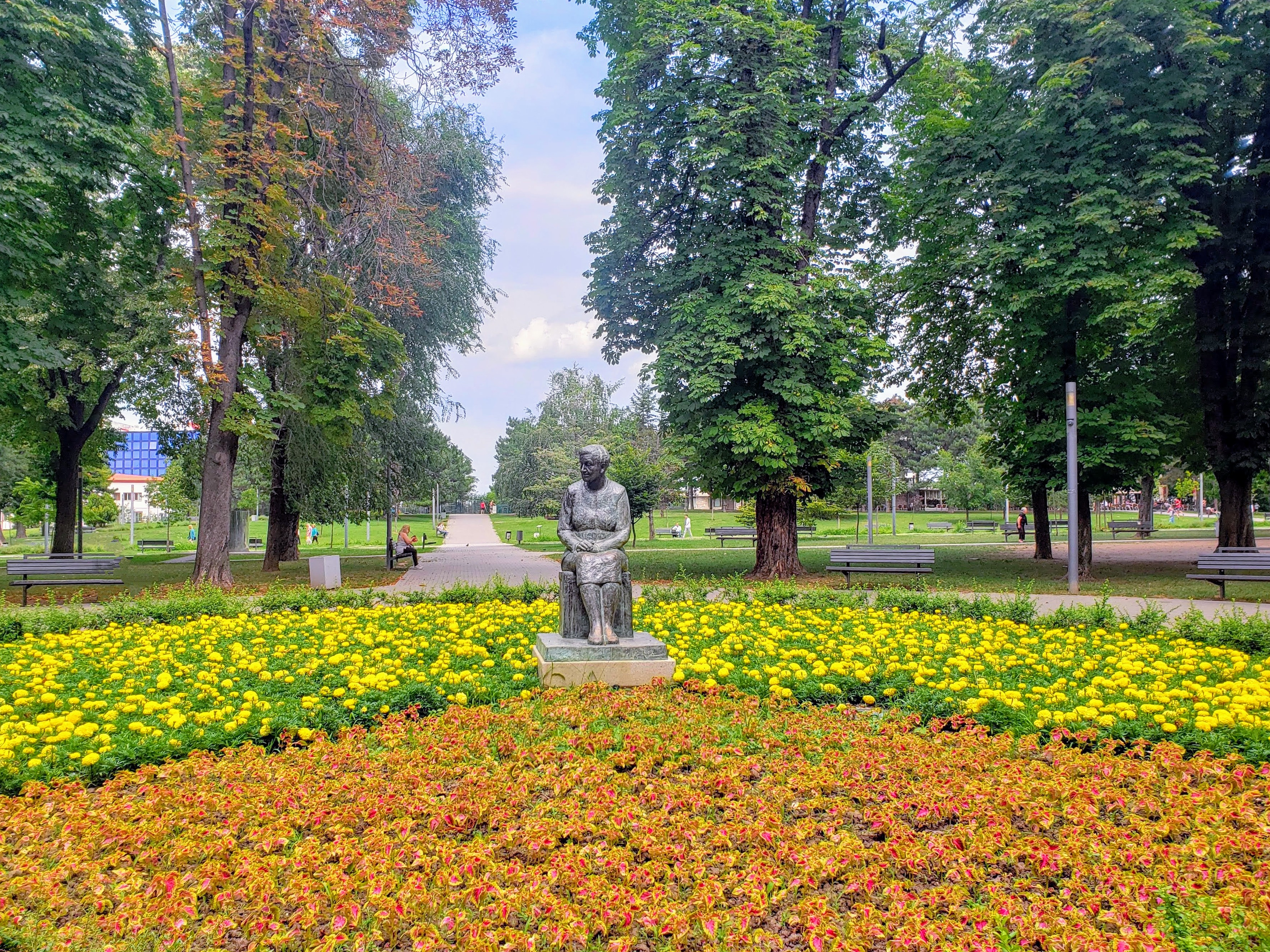
Statue of Desanka Maksimović at Tašmajdan

- RTS main building in Takovska and Aberdareva streets. Previously, the television headquarters were located on the Belgrade Fair. After the first phase of the construction was finished, Dnevnik, central daily news, began transmitting from Tašmajdan on 20 July 1967.
- the main post office building of the national post office company Pošta Srbije, built in 1934, in Takovska street.
- The University of Belgrade's Law School, in Bulevar kralja Aleksandra.
- Hotel "Taš", opened in March 1969.
- Metropol Hotel Belgrade, in Bulevar kralja Aleksandra.
- statue of Desanka Maksimović, leading Serbian poet, erected in 2007.
- statue of Milorad Pavić, Serbian writer, author of the Dictionary of the Khazars, erected in 2011.
- children's amusement park.
- many rock pigeons can be seen in the park, popular among the birdwatchers.
- roundabout of the tram line number 6.

== Little Tašmajdan ==
Little Tašmajdan (Serbian: Мали Ташмајдан / Mali Tašmajdan) is the eastern extension of the park, across Beogradska street which forms its western border, while Ilije Garašanina and Karnedžijeva streets form its northern and eastern borders, respectively. The southern section of the complex is the location of the Law Faculty and Hotel Metropol.

The park has undergone a renovation in 2006. Concrete walkways have been placed (6,000 square metres), and new stairways lighting have been installed. In the centre of the park a playing area for children has been constructed. Near the children's area there is a fountain which has also been renovated and 30 new benches have been placed in the park as well.

Marking 80th anniversary of his death, a monument to the Russian émigré architect Nikolay Krasnov was dedicated in the park. Krasnov designed some of the most representative public buildings in Belgrade during the Interbellum. A stone monument, representing Krasnov sitting at the drawing desk, is work of Nebojša Savović Nes. The monument, work of Russian sculptor Sergey Nikitin, was first announced for September 2016. The planned location was the Manjež park, but this plan never went through. The monument is ultimately placed in the Little Tašmajdan, across the building of the Archive of Serbia, which was designed by Krasnov.

== Underworld ==
Geologically, the rocks on Tašmajdan are 13,5 million years old, and the ridge was probably a low island during the existence of the inner Pannonian Sea. Fossils from this period have been found and are kept at the Museum of Natural History. The caves under Tašmajdan are 6 to 8 million years old. Remains of the Roman aqueduct are found in the caves. Military arsenals and warehouses have been housed for a long time in the catacombs left after the excavations of stone blocks, and these catacombs have been also used as shelters and first-aid places for wounded soldiers.

During the Interbellum, the Šonda family, who owned the chocolate factory, founded the "ice factory" in Tašmajdan's underground, below the modern building of Radio Television Serbia. The ice was advertised as the "ice from the tap water", as opposed to the naturally occurring ice from the Danube.

It was a major hiding place for the local population during the 1914–1915 bombing of Belgrade by the Austro-Hungarian army in World War I and German bombing in April 1941. During World War II, the caves were the headquarters of Alexander Löhr, head of the German Air forces in Serbia, and colloquially called "Löhr’s cave"., which is accessed after passing the former quarry. Headquarters were massive, with large metal doors, truck entrances and fully prepared to support 1,000 soldiers for six months without making any surface contact. It could survive chemical and biological attacks, had a ventilation system, power generator, phone lines and elevator and one of the caves was even adapted into the brig for disobedient soldiers. It was also used by the Germans as the collection center for the Jews. Vast labyrinth of corridors, expanded by the Wehrmacht, branches into all directions beneath the city and today nobody knows how many of them there are or where they all lead. Future examinations are slowed because of the lack of funding and many remaining German mines. After 1945 the entrances into the caves were closed and new generations completely lost any knowledge of it. It was only in the 2000s that they were rediscovered and today are slowly turning into one of Belgrade tourist attractions. Occasionally, people illegally dig through the walls of the caves, hoping to find some long lost treasure.

Third large natural cave is right beneath the famed "Poslednja Šansa" restaurant. It was described by Felix Kanitz, who travelled through Serbia from 1860 to 1864. He noted that in this cave he has found 150 oxcarts with food and that the entire cave could accommodate some 600 carts all together. After World War II, caves were used as “ice factory”, which supplied with ice city kafanas until the 1950s. A big boulder broke off in 1966, fell into the center of the cave and a little girl fell through the hole and got killed. When sports center was built, rubble and remaining bones from the old cemetery were thrown into the caves, with deposits being some 15 m (49 ft) high today. Old doctors used to say that from these piles they took bones for the anatomy classes. In general, the cave, known as the "Saltpeter cave", appears at least half of its real size being buried under the deposits and geologists dubbed it "the weirdest part of Belgrade". It branches into the direction of the Faculty of Law, but this corridor is completely buried and was never explored. All caves are cold and wet.

As the caves were under military jurisdiction after World War II, only when the military administration was revoked, the exploration of the underground began in 1992. The accessible sections of the underground are some 20 m (66 ft) below the park.

=== Aquarium ===
Underwater research company "Viridijan" announced in June 2006 it would begin construction of the first Belgrade's aquarium in the caves beneath Tašmajdan. The project includes construction of 50 underground aquariums with about 1,000 cubic meters of water in the period of 9 years. Over 900 marine animals were supposed to be placed in the natural environment provided by the caves. The project was initially backed by the Ministry of trade in the Government of Serbia and Belgrade City Assembly (the only problem appeared to be the building permit), but the project, which was promised to be "more than just exhibit space" and announcing "the return of Pannonian Sea to Belgrade" was abandoned.
