= Church of the Holy Trinity, Belgrade =

Church in Belgrade, Serbia

Church of the Holy Trinity
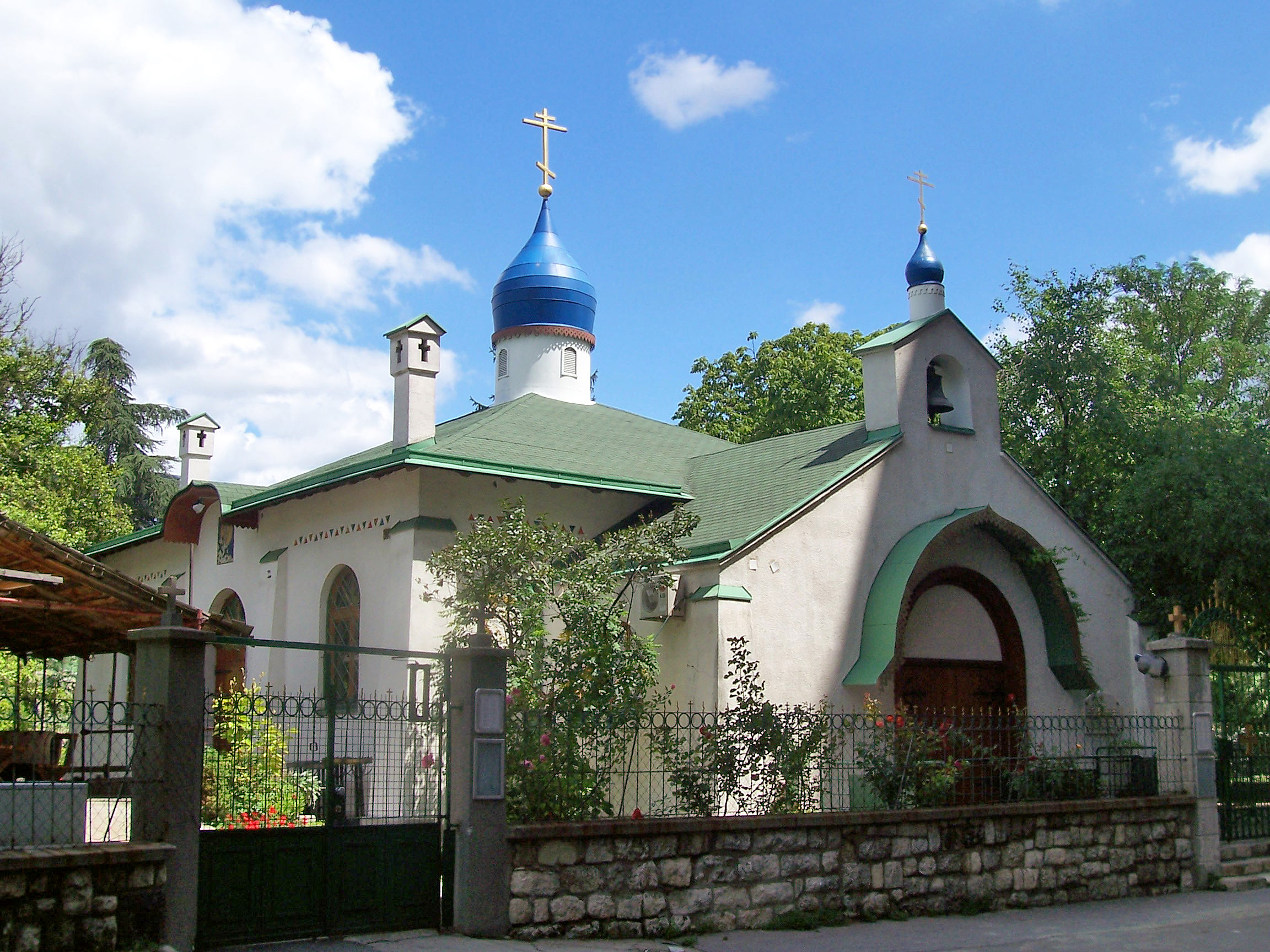
- Church of the Holy Trinity in Tašmajdan Park

- Location within Serbia

Religion
- Affiliation: Russian Orthodox Church (Moscow Patriarchate)
- Year consecrated: 1925

Location
- Location: Belgrade, Serbia
- Interactive map of Church of the Holy Trinity
- Coordinates: 44.8101°N 20.4685°E

Architecture
- Architect: Valery Stashevsky
- Style: Pskov Russian
- Completed: 1925

The Church of the Holy Trinity, also called the Russian Church, in Belgrade is a metochion of the Russian Orthodox church in Belgrade, Serbia. It was erected in 1924 according to the plans of Russian émigré architect Valery Stashevsky and was meant mainly for refugees from Soviet Russia who arrived in Serbia in thousands from 1920, after the defeat of the White Army in European part of Russia in the Russian Civil War. The church is located on the northern edge of the Tašmajdan Park, next to a much bigger Church of Saint Mark of the Serbian Orthodox Church.

== History ==
=== Origin ===
The Russian ecclesiastical community in Belgrade, a city where in the early 1920s Russians constituted over 10% of the capital's population, was founded in November 1920 by Russian émigré priest Petar (Pyotr) Belovodov (Петр Беловидов). Initially, the venue for services was the assembly hall of the Third Belgrade Gymnasium.

The construction of the church was begun in September 1924, in Tašmajdan, on the location of the former cemetery and next to the old St. Mark's church (a new, much larger one, was completed by 1940). The Serbian clergy of the St. Mark's parish opposed having a Russian church on their land, but through the intervention of Serbian Patriarch Dimitrije, they relented, albeit with some conditions attached: it was to be only temporarily on the ground of the Serbian church and without its own belfry. However, prime minister Nikola Pašić donated a bell to the Russian church.

=== Interbellum ===
The church building was consecrated by Serbian Patriarch Dimitrije on 5 July 1925. From the beginning, the church's parish was in the ecclesiastical jurisdiction of the Russian Orthodox Church Outside Russia (ROCOR), headed until 1936 by Metropolitan Antony (Khrapovitsky) (on 31 August 1921, the Council of Bishops of the Serbian Church passed a resolution, effective from 3 October, that recognised Metropolitan Anthony's Temporary Higher Church Administration Abroad as an administratively independent jurisdiction for exiled Russian clergy outside the Kingdom of SHS as well as those Russian clergy in the Kingdom of SHS who were not in parish or state educational service; the THCAA (later, ROCOR) jurisdiction also extended to divorce cases of the exiled Russians). The main Russian shrine that was preserved in the church from the end of 1927 until September 1944 was the Kursk Root Icon.

Patriarch Varnava of Serbia (1930–1937) conducted a service in the Russian church on 22 June 1930, shortly after the enthronement as Patriarch, and delivered a passionate anti-Bolshevik speech in Russian.

The first rector was Archpriet Petar (Pyotr) Belovodov, from 1924 until his death in 1940. Belovodov was succeeded by Jovan Sokalj (1883–1965).

Russian general Pyotr Wrangel, the last commander of the Russian Army in South Russia, was re-buried in the church in October 1929. Until 1944, over 200 military flags of Napoleon′s and Ottomans′ armies, which were trophies of the Russian army, were kept inside the church. They included flags from the French invasion of Russia in 1812, the Siege of Sevastopol in 1854-55 and Serbian-Ottoman war in 1876–78. There were also flags of the White movement military units, formed during the Russian Civil War in 1917-22 but also other relics, silver trumpets, etc., so for a period of time, members of those units were organizing night guards of honor around the church.

On 5 July 1931, Patriarch Varnava consecrated the Iveron Chapel in the New Cemetery in Belgrade, which, while modeled on the Iveron chapel in the Red Square (destroyed in 1929), was in effect a church in its own right, complete with an altar, and served as a separate parish until 1945, when it was attached to the Trinity church metochion.

=== World War II and later ===
In September 1944, shortly before the capture of Belgrade by the Red Army and Communist partisans, the parish was abandoned by the Karlovci-based administration of the anti-Soviet ROCOR (then headed by Metropolitan Anastasius (Gribanovsky)); its rector priest Sokalj, who in 1946 became a citizen of the USSR and in January 1950 had to leave for the USSR, requested transfer to the jurisdiction of the pro-Soviet Moscow-based Russian Orthodox Church (Moscow Patriarchate) and in April 1945 joined the Moscow Patriarchate. The parish was transformed into a metochion (representation) of the Moscow Patriarchate and was part of the Patriarchal deanery in Yugoslavia. The deanery was abolished in 1956 and all other Russian parishes in Yugoslavia were transferred to the jurisdiction of the Serbian Church. The Russian Iveron chapel in the New Cemetery as well as the Russian part of the cemetery were adjoined to the metochion.

Since 1950, the position of rectors of the metochion church has been held by the Tarasyevs family, the first rector being Vitaly Tarasyev born in Mariupol, the Russian Empire, in 1901, who emigrated to Serbia through Galipolli in 1920.

In April 1999, the church building was severely damaged during the NATO bombing of Yugoslavia, by an air missile attack that targeted the building of Radio Television of Serbia located next to the church; the church was re-consecrated in March 2007.

== Characteristics ==
The church was projected by the Russian architect Valery Vladimirovich Stashevsky, in the old, Novgorod-style of religious architecture. It has a valuable iconostasis, carved in xylograph, with copies of the old, Russian frescoes.
