= Big Staircase in Kalemegdan Park =

Staircase in Belgrade, Serbia

Coordinates: 44°49′17.14″N 20°26′57.24″E

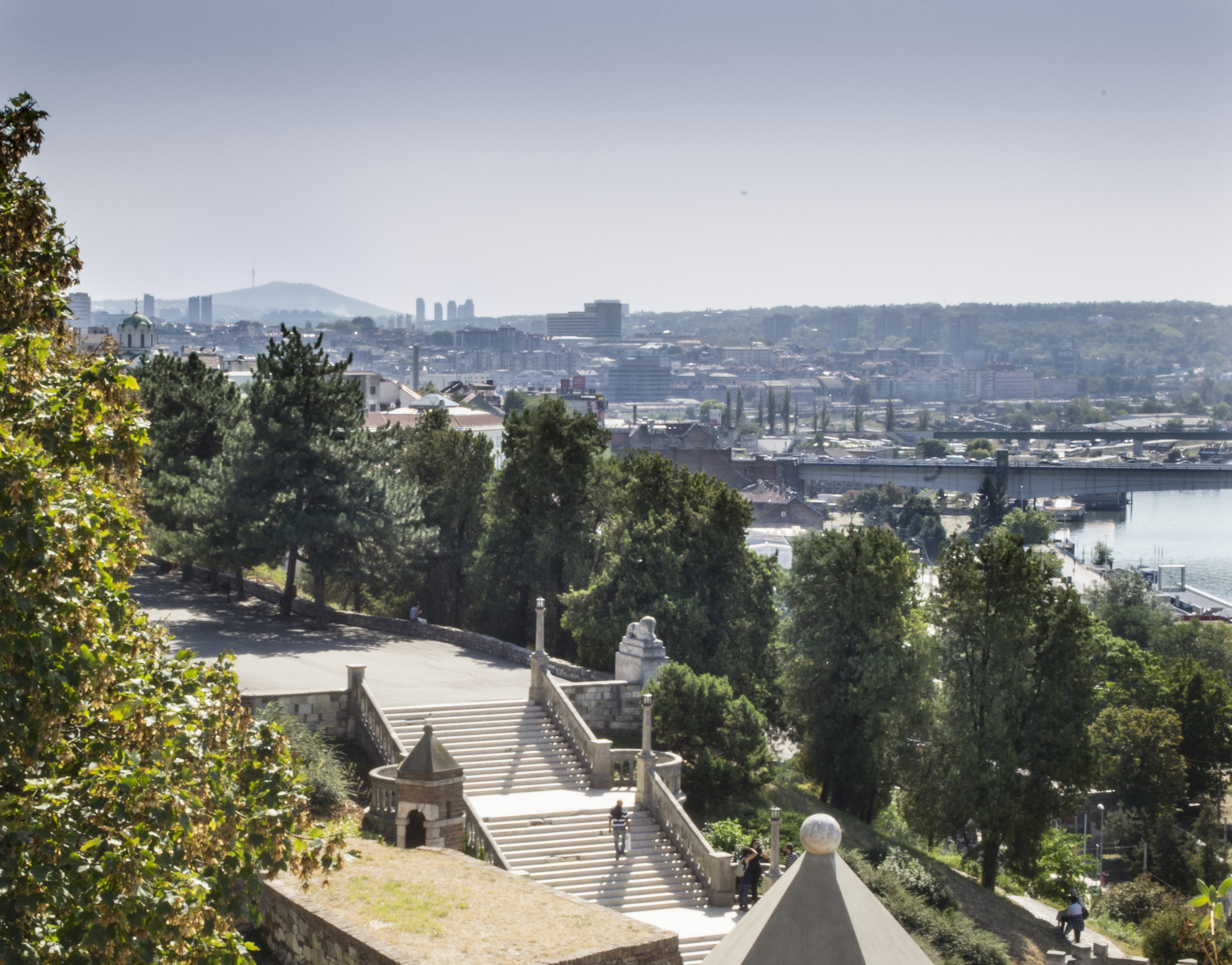
Panoramic view on the Big Staircase (2012)

The Big Staircase in Kalemegdan Park (Serbian: Велико степениште у Калемегданском парку, romanized: Veliko stepenište u Kalemegdanskom parku) is the most monumental park motif in Kalemegdan Park. It occupies the area in the southwest frontline of the fortress, on the location of the former rampart and a hidden road.

== History ==
=== Construction ===
The staircase was built during a major rearrangement and renovation of Kalemegdan Park. The concept design was done by Aleksandar Krstić, head of the parks department in the city administration, while the main project was work of Đorđe Kovaljevski. Main works were finished in 1928. During World War II, the staircase was damaged both during the German bombing of Belgrade in April 1941 and later during the war.

At the same time when the staircase was being finished, so was the relocation of the Old Cemetery from Tašmajdan. City administration was left with the large number of tombstones so they decided to reuse them for construction works around the city, including the pathways connecting the staircase with the rest of the fortress. A path connecting the fortress with the Lower Town below was completely made of tombstones with the inscribed sides turned down. Belgrade chronicler Zoran Nikolić labeled it the Path of the "Former" Deceased. A tombstone was also used as the part of the pedestal of the nearby Pobednik monument. Citizens protested, despite this was the usual practice in the Balkan history in general (the old, reused materials are called spolije) as there are numerous Greek, Roman and Byzantine remains in the region. One of the stone benches on the promenade extending from the staircase was made in a way where the name of the deceased, Aksentije Jovanović, was clearly visible, together with the carved cross and skull and crossbones.

=== After World War II ===
After the war, the staircase was only partially repaired. It was neglected during the 1950s and the 1960s. The staircase remained that way until 1987. That year, a project of the full reconstruction of the staircase was completed, including the restoration of the balustrades, columns and lanterns. The work was conducted in 1989, including the completely new steps. The choice of material, Brač limestone, proved to be a bad one. Due to the bad frost resilience, the steps soon began to crack soon. In October 2006 the steps were renovated again, but again the bad method was chosen. The cracks were filled with cement and artificial stone which only accelerated the cracking.

The staircase deteriorated more in time and the new reconstruction was scheduled for the summer of 2016, but then was postponed to December 2017 and then to December 2018, due to the lack of funds. It was finally scheduled for March 2019. The stone steps and lining of the podests will be removed, cleaned and returned with the new stainless steel made clamps. The subwall will also be renovated and the ruined stone slabs will be replaced. Second phase, which includes the rearrangement of the wider surrounding area of the Big Staircase is set for October 2020. However, when works began in March 2019, instead of restoration and repair of the staircase, it was actually smashed. Architects and art historians protested, but city administration said "this is the best way".

The Brač limestone was replaced with Danilovgrad limestone. Nine stone jardinières which were originally sculptured on the staircase, but perished in time, were restored. They are made of sandstone from Bela Voda.

== Architecture ==
It was envisioned as the three-part object, including two rest areas (podest) with semi-circle expansions. The staircase is designed in the Romanticist style, incorporating elements of the Serbo-Byzantine Revival. It is embellished with the sculpture of the lying lion by Sreten Stojanović. The railing was made of sandstone. The decorative balustrade was demolished in World War II.
