= NATO bombing of the Radio Television of Serbia headquarters =

NATO attack on a target during the 1999 NATO aerial bombardment of Yugoslavia

NATO bombing of the Radio Television of Serbia Headquarters
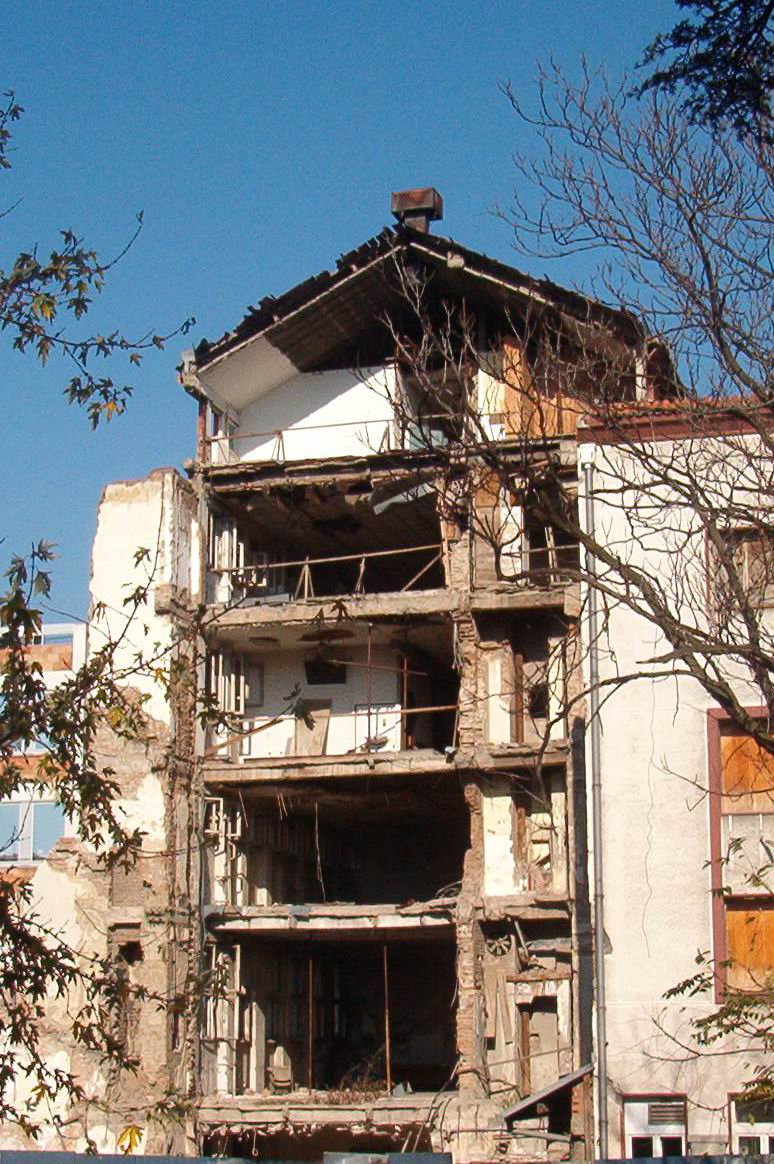
- The damaged headquarters of RTS
- Location: 44°48′41″N 20°28′12″E; Belgrade, Federal Republic of Yugoslavia
- Date: 23 April 1999; 02:06 am (CET)
- Target: Radio Television of Serbia
- Attack type: Missile attack
- Deaths: 16
- Injuries: 16
- Perpetrator: NATO

The NATO bombing of the Radio Television of Serbia (RTS) headquarters occurred on the early morning of 23 April 1999, during Operation Allied Force. Sixteen employees of RTS were killed when a NATO missile hit the building.

== Bombing of RTS ==
The bombing was part of NATO's aerial campaign against the Federal Republic of Yugoslavia, and severely damaged the Belgrade headquarters of the state-owned Radio Television of Serbia (RTS). Other radio and electrical installations throughout the country were also attacked. Sixteen employees of RTS were killed when a single NATO missile hit the building. Nearly all the RTS employees killed were technicians, security workers and makeup artists. Many were trapped for days, only communicating over mobile phones. The station returned to the air less than 24 hours later from a secret location. The building of the Russian church nearby was also seriously damaged.

According to General Wesley Clark, the commander who oversaw the bombing campaign, NATO had planted a question at a Pentagon news conference to alert the Yugoslav government of their intention to target the broadcaster.

=== Justification ===
NATO Headquarters justified the bombing with two arguments; firstly, that it was necessary "to disrupt and degrade the command, control and communications network" of the Yugoslav Armed Forces, and secondly, that the RTS headquarters was a dual-use object which "was making an important contribution to the propaganda war which orchestrated the campaign against the population of Kosovo".

The Yugoslav government said the building served no military purpose and only accommodated facilities of the civilian television network. It was, therefore, not a legitimate military target.

== Reactions ==
France was opposed to the attack. There was considerable disagreement between the United States and the French government regarding the legitimacy and legality of the bombing.

While giving a speech at the Overseas Press Club sixtieth anniversary dinner, held on Thursday evening 22 April 1999 EST at the Grand Hyatt Hotel in New York City, US envoy to Yugoslavia Richard Holbrooke reacted to the NATO's bombing of the RTS headquarters almost immediately after it took place: "Eason Jordan told me just before I came up here that while we've been dining tonight, the air strikes hit Serb TV and took out the Serb television, and at least for the time being they’re off the air. That is an enormously important event, if it is in fact as Eason reported it, and I believe everything CNN tells me. If, in fact, they're off the air even temporarily, as all of you know, one of the three key pillars, along with the security forces and the secret police, have been at least temporarily removed. And it is an enormously important and, I think, positive development."

A report by Amnesty International into NATO's bombing in Yugoslavia said NATO had violated international law by targeting areas where civilians were certain to be killed. In particular, the Amnesty report said the bombing of the RTS building by NATO "was a deliberate attack on a civilian object and as such constitutes a war crime".

Human Rights Watch also condemned the attack, stating that "Even if one could justify legal attacks on civilian radio and television, there does not appear to be any justification for attacking urban studios, as opposed to transmitters".

In 2001, the European Court of Human Rights declared inadmissible a case brought on behalf of the station's employees by six Yugoslav citizens against NATO. Dragoljub Milanović, general manager of Radio Television of Serbia, was sentenced to 10 years in prison for failing to evacuate the building.

Tim Judah and others stated that RTS had been broadcasting Serb nationalist propaganda, which demonised ethnic minorities and legitimised Serb atrocities against them.

Noam Chomsky said NATO's bombing of RTS was an act of terrorism.

According to an Amnesty article published in 2009, nobody was held accountable for the attack itself, and no justice for the victims has been made.

A report prepared by the International Criminal Tribunal for the former Yugoslavia (ICTY) entitled "Final Report to the Prosecutor by the Committee Established to Review the NATO Bombing Campaign Against the Federal Republic of Yugoslavia" concluded that the TV station's broadcasts to generate support for the war was not sufficient to make the RTS building a military target, but that the TV network had been part of the overall military communication system of the Serbian government, thus making the RTS building a legitimate military target. It said:

Insofar as the attack actually was aimed at disrupting the communications network, it was legally acceptable ... NATO’s targeting of the RTS building for propaganda purposes was an incidental (albeit complementary) aim of its primary goal of disabling the Serbian military command and control system and to destroy the nerve system and apparatus that keeps Milošević in power

In regards to civilian casualties, it further stated that though they were, "unfortunately high, they do not appear to be clearly disproportionate."

== Aftermath ==
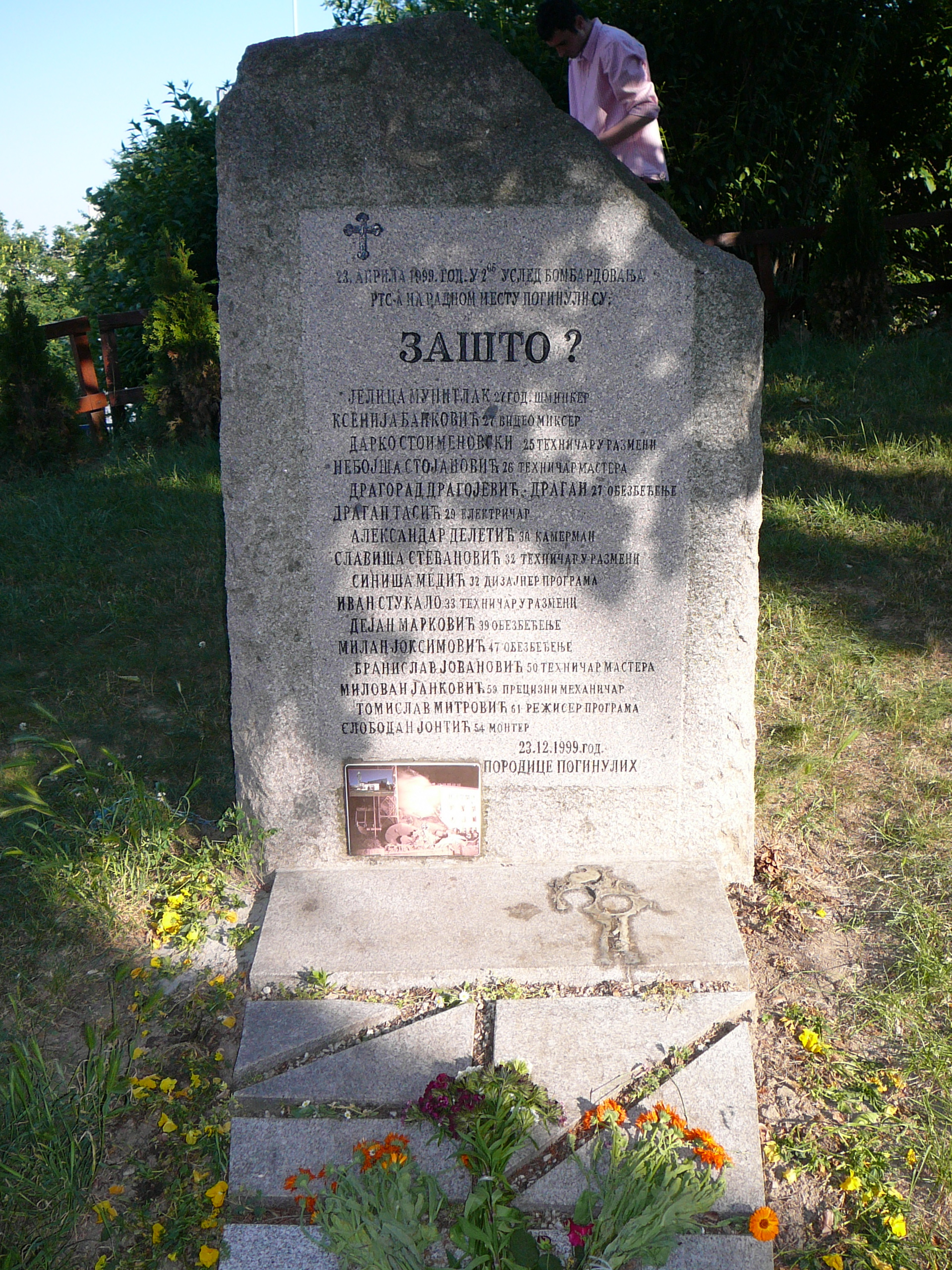
The Tašmajdan park memorial to the victims of 23 April 1999 NATO bombing includes names, ages, and job descriptions of each person killed in the attack. At the bottom of the memorial there is a photo of the building taken just after the attack, during rescue operations.

The RTS building remains as it was left by the bombing. A new building has since been built next to the bomb-damaged one, and a monument has been erected to those killed in the attack.

In 2002, Dragoljub Milanović, the general manager of RTS, was sentenced to 10 years in prison because he had not ordered the workers in the building to evacuate, despite knowing that the building could be bombed.

== See also ==
- Al Jazeera bombing memo
- Legitimacy of NATO bombing of Yugoslavia
- Propaganda during the Yugoslav Wars
