= List of air forces =

This alphabetically arranged list of air forces identifies the current and historical names and roundels for the military aviation arms of countries fielding an air component, whether an independent air forces, a naval aviation, or army aviation units. At the end is a separate list of no longer existent nations that once operated air forces. Country names in italics indicate that they are not generally recognized internationally as independent states but which nonetheless managed to field an active air service. For information on the size of military for

== A ==
Country	Current	Service Indigenous name	Former	Established
Afghanistan		Islamic Emirate Air Force دافغانستان هوايۍ ځواک		2021
Afghanistan		Afghan Air Force		2010–2021
Afghanistan		Afghan Army Air Corps		2002–2010
Afghanistan		Afghan National Army Air Corps		1996–2001
Afghanistan		Air and Air Defense Force of the Islamic State of Afghanistan		1992–1996
Afghanistan		former insignia		1983–1992
Afghanistan		Democratic Republic of Afghanistan Air Force; Armed Forces of the Democratic Republic of Afghanistan		1979-1983
Afghanistan		Afghan Republican Air Force; De Afghan Hanoi Quirah		1973–1979
Afghanistan		Royal Afghan Air Force		1948–1973
Afghanistan		Afghan Air Force; Afghan Hawa-e Ourdou		1937–1947
Afghanistan		Afghan Military Air Arm		1924-1929
Albania		Albanian Air Force		1951
Albania		Air Force of the Albanian People's Army; Albanian People's Army		1951–1991
Albania		Royal Albanian Air Corps; Royal Albanian Army		1914–1939
Algeria		Algerian Air Force القُوَّاتُ الجَوِّيَّةُ الجَزَائِرِيَّةُ Al-quwwa al-jawwiyya al-jazaeriyya Armée de l'Air Algérienne		1962
Algeria		former insignia		1962–1964
Angola		National Air Force of Angola; Força Aérea Nacional de Angola		2007
Angola		Angolan People's Air Force And Air Defence Force; Força Aérea Popular de Angolia; People's Armed Forces of Liberation of Angola		1975-2007
Angola		former insignia		1975–1980
Antigua and Barbuda		Antigua and Barbuda Defence Force Air Wing		2022
Argentina		Argentine Air Force; Fuerza Aérea Argentina		1945
Argentina		Army Aeronautical Service; Servicio Aeronáutico del Ejército		1912–1945
Argentina		Argentine Naval Aviation; Comando de Aviación Naval Argentina		1919
Argentina		former insignia		
Argentina		Argentine Army Aviation; Comando de Aviación del Ejército Argentino		1956
Argentina		Argentine Coast Guard Air Service; Servicio de Aviación de la Prefectura Naval Argentina		1970
Argentina		Argentine Gendarmería; Dirección de Aeronáutica de Gendarmería		1955
Armenia		Armenian Air Force; Հայաստանի Ռազմաօդային Ուժեր		1992
Australia		Royal Australian Air Force		1921
Australia		former insignia		1945–1956
Australia		former insignia		1943-1946
Australia		former insignia		1942–1946
Australia		Royal Australian Air Force		1921–1942
Australia		Australian Air Force		March–August 1921
Australia		Australian Air Corps; Australian Army		1920-1921
Australia		Australian Flying Corps; First Australian Imperial Force		1912-1920
Australia		Fleet Air Arm		1947
Australia		Australian Army Aviation		1968
Australia		1st Aviation Regiment (Divisional)		1966–1968
Australia		No. 16 Army Light Aircraft Squadron		1960–1966
Austria		Austrian Air Force; Österreichische Luftstreitkräfte		1955
Austria		Austrian Air Force; Österreichische Luftstreitkräfte		1928-1938
Austria		Imperial and Royal Aviation Troops		1893–1918
Azerbaijan		Azerbaijani Air and Air Defence Force; Azərbaycan hərbi hava qüvvələri		1991

== B ==
Country	Current	Service Indigenous name	Former	Established
Bahamas		Royal Bahamas Defence Force Air Wing		1981
Bahrain		Royal Bahraini Air Force سلاح الجو الملكي البحريني		2002
Bahrain		Bahrain Amiri Air Force		1987-2002
Bahrain		Bahrain Defence Force Air Wing		1977-1987
Bahrain		Public Security Forces aviation Paramilitary security organization, national police force of Bahrain.		1971
Bahrain		Bahrain State Police Air Wing		1965-1971
Bangladesh		Bangladesh Air Force বাংলাদেশ বিমান বাহিনী Bangladesh Biman Bahini		1971
Bangladesh		Operation Kilo Flight		1971-1972
Bangladesh		Bangladesh Naval Aviation		2011
Bangladesh		Bangladesh Army Aviation Group		1978
Bangladesh		Bangladesh Border Guards; Bangladesh Army, Ministry of Defence (Bangladesh) wartime only		
Barbados		Barbados Defence Force Air Wing		1979-1985
Belarus		Belarusian Air Force; Ваенна-паветраныя сілы і войскі супрацьпаветранай абароны Рэспублікі Беларусь; Vayenna-pavyetranyya sily i voyski supratspavyetranay abarony Respubliki Byelarus		post 1995
Belarus		Belarus Air Force		1991–1995
Belgium		Belgian Air Component; Luchtcomponent, Composante Air		2002
Belgium		Belgian Air Force; Belgische Luchtmacht, Force Aerienne Belge		1946-2001
Belgium		Free Belgian Air Force		1940-1946
Belgium		Military Aviation; Militair Vliegwezen, Aviation Militaire		1915-1940
Belgium		Company of Aviators; Compagnie des Ouvries et Aérostiers		1910–1915
Belgium		Belgian Navy		1962–2002
Belgium		Belgian Army		1954–2002
Belgium		Belgian Gendarmerie		1968-2001
Belize		Belize Defence Force Air Wing		1983
Benin		Benin Air Force; Force Aérienne de Benin		1990
Benin		People's Republic of Benin Air Force		1975–1990
Benin		Dahomey Air Force; Force Aérienne de Dahomey		1961-1975
Bolivia		Bolivian Air Force; Fuerza Aérea Boliviana		1944
Bolivia		Bolivian Military Aviation Corps; Cuerpo de Aviación		1923–1944
Bolivia		Bolivian Naval Aviation		
Bolivia		Bolivian Army Aviation		
Bosnia and Herzegovina		Air Force and Anti-Aircraft Defence of Bosnia and Herzegovina; Ваздухопловство и ПВО; Zrakoplovstvo i PZO		2007
Bosnia and Herzegovina		Federation of Bosnia and Herzegovina Air Force; Zračne Snage Armije Federacije BiH		1996–2006
Bosnia and Herzegovina		Republika Srpska Air Force; Ратно Ваздухопловство и ПВО ВРС; Ratno Vazduhoplovstvo i PVO VRS		1992–2006
Bosnia and Herzegovina		Croatian Defence Council aviation		1992–
Bosnia and Herzegovina		Army of the Republic of Bosnia and Herzegovina Air Force; Zračne Snage Armije Republike BiH		1992–1996
Botswana		Air Arm Command (Botswana)		1977
Brazil		Brazilian Air Force; Força Aérea Brasileira (FAB)		1941
Brazil		Brazilian Naval Aviation; Aviação Naval		1916
Brazil		Brazilian Army Aviation; Aviação do Exército Brasileiro		1919
Brazil		Brazilian Military Police		
Brunei		Royal Brunei Air Force تنترا اودارا دراج بروني; Angkatan Tentera Udara Diraja Brunei		1991
Brunei		Royal Brunei Armed Forces Air Wing		1984-1991
Brunei		Royal Brunei Malay Regiment, Air Wing		1966-1984
Bulgaria		Bulgarian Air Force; Български Военновъздушни Сили		1992
Bulgaria		Bulgarian People's Army Air Force; Български Военновъздушни Сили		1949–1992
Bulgaria		Air Army; Въздушни Войски		1945–1949
Bulgaria		former insignia		1941–1944
Bulgaria		Royal Bulgarian Air Force		1937–1941
Bulgaria		Gendarmery Aeroplane Detachment; Zhandarmeriisko Aeroplanno Otdelenie		1919-1920
Bulgaria		Army Aviation Corps		1915–1918
Bulgaria		Aeronautical Detachment		1906-1914
Bulgaria		Bulgarian Naval Aviation; Aviatsia Na Bulgarskiya Voennomorski Flot (AnBVMF)		1992
Bulgaria		Independent ASW Squadron of the Navy; Otdelna Protivolodachna Eskadrila na VMF (OPLEV-VMF)		1959–1990
Bulgaria		Bulgarian Naval Aviation		1915–1918
Burkina Faso		Burkina Faso Air Force; Force Aérienne de Burkina Faso		1984
Burkina Faso		Upper Volta Air Force; Force Aérienne de Haute-Volta		1964–1984
Burundi		Burundi Army Aviation; Force Armée du Burundi		1966

== C ==
Country	Current	Service Indigenous name	Former	Established
Cambodia		Royal Cambodian Air Force ទ័ពអាកាសខេមរភូមិន្ទ; Toăp Akas Khémôrôphumĭnt		1993
Cambodia		Cambodian People's Air Force		1989–1993
Cambodia		former insignia		1989–1993
Cambodia		Kampuchean People's Revolutionary Air Force		1979-1989
Cambodia		Air Force of the Liberation Army of Kampuchea		1977–1979
Cambodia		Khmer Air Force; Khmer National Armed Forces		1970–1975
Cambodia		Royal Khmer Air Force		1954–1970
Cambodia		Royal Gendarmerie of Cambodia aviation Royal Cambodian Armed Forces		
Cameroon		Cameroon Air Force; Armée de l'Air du Cameroun		1960
Canada		Royal Canadian Air Force; Aviation Royale Canadienne		2011
Canada		Canadian Forces Air Command (AIRCOM); Commandement de la Force aérienne du Canada		1968-2011
Canada		Royal Canadian Air Force		1965-1968
Canada		Royal Canadian Air Force		1948-1965
Canada		Royal Canadian Air Force		1946-1948
Canada		Royal Canadian Air Force		1924-1946
Canada		Canadian Air Force (Air Board)		1920-1924
Canada		Canadian Air Force (in Europe)		1918–1920
Canada		Royal Air Force Canada		1918–1919
Canada		Royal Flying Corps Canada		1917–1918
Canada		Canadian Aviation Corps		1914–1915
Canada		Royal Canadian Naval Air Service		1918-1919
Canada		Canadian Army		1948–1965
Canada		Royal Canadian Mounted Police aviation - National police and gendarmerie service of Canada.		
Cape Verde		Cape Verde Air Force; Força Aérea Caboverdiana		1992
Cape Verde		Former roundel	Cape Verde	1980s-1992
Central African Republic		Central African Republic Air Force; Force Aérienne Centrafricaine		1979–
Central African Republic		Central African Empire Air Force		1976–1979
Central African Republic		Central African Republic Air Force		1961–1976
Chad		Chadian Air Force; Force Aérienne Tchadienne		1973
Chile		Chilean Air Force; Fuerza Aérea de Chile (FACh)		1930
Chile		Chilean Naval Aviation; Servicio de Aviación de la Armada de Chile		1953
Chile		Chilean Army Aviation; Comando de Aviación del Ejército de Chile		1970
Chile		Carabineros de Chile		1960
China (PRC)		People's Liberation Army Air Force 中国人民解放军空军; Zhongguo Renmin Jiefangjun Kongjun		1949
China (PRC)		Red Army of China Air Force		c. 1930
China (PRC)		People's Liberation Army Naval Air Force 中国人民解放军海军航空兵; Zhongguo Renmin Jiefangjun Haijun Hangkongbing		1952
China (PRC)		People's Liberation Army Ground Force Aviation 中国人民解放军陆军航空兵		1987
China (PRC)		People's Armed Police aviation - Chinese paramilitary organization, gendarmerie, border guard force. During wartime the PAP would provide support to the People's Liberation Army.		
China (PRC)		China Marine Surveillance aviation		-2013
Colombia		Colombian Air Force; Fuerza Aérea Colombiana		1922
Colombia		former insignia		1927–1953
Colombia		Colombian Naval Aviation; Aviación Naval		1984
Colombia		Colombian National Army Aviation; Aviación del Ejército		1995
Comoros		Comoros Military Aviation Command		1976
Congo		Air Force of the Republic of Congo; Force 'Aérienne Congolaise		1992
Congo		People’s Republic of Congo Air Force; L'Armée de l'Air du Congo		1970–1992
Congo		Congolese Air Force		1961–1970
Dem. Rep. of the Congo		Air Force of the Democratic Republic of the Congo; Force Aérienne du Congo		
Dem. Rep. of the Congo		Zaire Air Force		1971–1997
Costa Rica		Air Surveillance Service; Servicio de Vigilancia Aérea (SVA) – Fuerza Pública		1994
Costa Rica		Air Section of the Costa Rican Civil Guard; Sección Aérea del Guardia Civil		1955-1994
Costa Rica		Costa Rican Military Air Force; Fuerza Aérea Militar		1947–1949
Croatia		Croatian Air Force and Air Defense; Hrvatsko ratno zrakoplovstvo i protuzračna obrana		1991
Croatia		former insignia		1991–1994
Croatia		Air Force of the Independent State of Croatia; Zrakoplovstvo Nezavisne Države Hrvatske		1941–1945
Cuba		Cuban Revolutionary Air and Air Defense Force; Fuerza Aérea Revolucionaria		1959
Cuba		Cuban Rebel Air Force; Fuerza Aérea Rebelde		1958
Cuba		Cuban Army Air Force; Fuerza Aérea del Ejército de Cuba		1952–1958
Cuba		Cuban Army Air Corps; Cuerpo Aéreo del Ejército de Cuba		1915–1952
Cuba		Cuban Naval Aviation; Aviación Naval		1934–1952
Cyprus		Air Command of Cyprus; Διοίκηση Αεροπορίας Κύπρου		1996
Cyprus		Cyprus National Guard Air Wing		1973–1996
Czech Republic		Czech Air Force; Vzdušné síly armády České republiky		1993
Czech Republic		Czechoslovak Air Force; Československé letectvo Czechoslovak Army		1926–1993
Czech Republic		former insignia		1921–1926
Czech Republic		former insignia		1918–1921

== D ==
Country	Current	Service Indigenous name	Former	Established
Denmark		Royal Danish Air Force; Flyvevåbnet		1950
Denmark		Danish Navy Air Squadron; Søværnets Helikoptertjeneste		2003-2010
Denmark		Royal Danish Army Flying Service; Hærens Flyvetjeneste (HFT)		1971–2003
Denmark		Royal Danish Navy Flying Service; Søværnets Flyvetjeneste (SVF)		1962–2003
Denmark		Danish Brigade in Sweden		1943–1945
Denmark		Royal Danish Army Air Corps; Hærens Flyvertropper		1912–1950
Denmark		Royal Danish Naval Aviation; Marinens Flyvevæsen		1911–1950
Denmark		Air Force Home Guard; Home Guard (Denmark), Danish Defence		1953
Djibouti (formerly the French Territory of Afars and Issas)		Djibouti Air Force; Force Aérienne du Djibouti		1977
Dominican Republic		Dominican Air Force; Fuerza Aérea Dominicana (FAD)		1962
Dominican Republic		Dominican Military Aviation; Aviación Militar Dominicana (AMD)		1957–1962
Dominican Republic		Dominican Air Force; Fuerza Aérea Dominicana (FAD)		1955–1957
Dominican Republic		Dominican Military Aviation; Aviación Militar Dominicana (AMD)		1952–1955
Dominican Republic		Dominican Air Force; Fuerza Aérea Dominicana (FAD)		1950–1952
Dominican Republic		Dominican Military Aviation Corps (DMAC); El Cuerpo de Aviación Militar Dominicana (CAMD/AMD)		1948–1950
Dominican Republic		Air Cavalry Squadron; Escuadrón de Caballería Aérea (EdCA)		2002
Dominican Republic		Air Transport Cavalry Brigade; Brigada de Caballería Aerotransportada		2001–2002
Dominican Republic		Aviation Company of the National Army; Compañía de Aviación del Ejército Nacional		1942–1948
Dominican Republic		Dominican Army Aviation Company; Compañía de Aviación del Ejército Dominicano		1939–1942
Dominican Republic		Aviation Detachment of the National Army; Destacamento de Aviación del Ejército Nacional		1936–1939
Dominican Republic		National Air Transport Company, Aviation Arm; Compañía Nacional de Transporte Aérea, Arma de Aviación		1934–1935
Dominican Republic		Aviation Company; Compañía de Aviación		1933–1934
Dominican Republic		Aviation Arm of the National Army; Arma de Aviación del Ejército Nacional		1932–1933
Dominican Republic		Dominican Republic Naval Aviation Corps; Cuerpo de Aviación Naval Dominicana		2003
Dominican Republic		Coastguard Search and Rescue Squadron; Escuadrón de Vigilancia y Rescate de Guardacostas		1951–1952

== E ==
Country	Current	Service Indigenous name	Former	Established
Ecuador		Ecuadorian Air Force; Fuerza Aérea Ecuatoriana		1944
Ecuador		Ecuadorian Naval Aviation; Aviación Naval Ecuatoriana		1967
Ecuador		Ecuadorian Army Aviation; Aviación del Ejército Ecuatoriano		1954
Egypt		Egyptian Air Force القوات الجوية المصرية; Al Quwwat Al Jawwiya Il Misriya		1971
Egypt		United Arab Republic Air Force (Egypt)		1961–1971
Egypt		United Arab Republic Air Force; Armed Forces of the United Arab Republic		1958–1961
Egypt		Egyptian Air force		1953–1958
Egypt		Royal Egyptian Air Force		1937–1952
Egypt		Egyptian Army Air Force		1932–1937
Egypt		former insignia		1932
El Salvador		Salvadoran Air Force; Fuerza Aérea Salvadoreña		1923
Equatorial Guinea		Equatorial Guinea Air Corps		1979
Eritrea		Eritrean Air Force		1994
Estonia		Estonian Air Force; Eesti Õhuvägi		1991
Estonia		Aviation Regiment		1920?–1940
Estonia		Aviation Company		1918–1920?
Estonia		National Border Guard Aviation Group; Estonian Border Guard		1993-2010
Eswatini (formerly Swaziland)		Military of Eswatini Air Wing		1979
Eswatini (formerly Swaziland)		Umbutfo Swaziland Defence Force Air Wing	Eswatini	1979-2018
Ethiopia		Ethiopian Air Force የኢትዮጵያ አየር ኃይል; Ye Ithopya Ayer Hayl		1975
Ethiopia		former air force insignia		1996-2009?
Ethiopia		Ethiopian Air Force		1975 (re-established in 1995)
Ethiopia		Ethiopian Air Force		1975 (disestablished in 1991)
Ethiopia		Imperial Ethiopian Air Force		1946–1975
Ethiopia		Imperial Ethiopian Aviation		1929–1935
Ethiopia		Ethiopian Navy aviation		1955–1996
Ethiopia		Ethiopian Ground Forces Aviation		1970s

== F ==
Country	Current	Service Indigenous name	Former	Established
Fiji		Air Wing of the Republic of Fiji Military Forces		1987–1997
Finland		Finnish Air Force; Suomen ilmavoimat Finländska flygvapnet		1918
Finland		former insignia		1918–1945
Finland		Roundel variant on some aircraft		1943–45
Finland		Army Corps of Aviation		1918–1928
Finland		Finnish Army Aviation; Suomen maavoimat – Helikopteripataljoona; Finländska armén – Helikopterbataljonen		1997
Finland		Finnish Border Guards; Finnish Defence Forces wartime only		
France		French Air and Space Force; Armée de l'Air et de l’Espace		2020
France		French Air Force; Armée de l'Air		1933–2020
France		Free French Air Force; Forces Aériennes Françaises Libres		1940–1945
France		Vichy French Air Force; Armée de l'air de l'armistice		1940–1942
France		French Air Force; Armée de l'Air		1933–1940
France		French Army Aviation; Aéronautique militaire		1909–1933
France		French Naval Aviation; Aéronautique navale		1912
France		Free French Naval Air Service; Aéronavale Francaise Libre		1940–1945
France		French Naval Air Arm		1912–1940
France		French Army Light Aviation; Aviation Légère de l'Armée de Terre		1954
France		French Aerostatic Corps; French Revolutionary Army		1794-1799
France		National Gendarmerie aviation		1943

== G ==
Country	Current	Service Indigenous name	Former	Established
Gabon		Gabonese Air Force; Armée de l'Air Gabonaise		1961
Gambia (formerly part of the Senegambia Confederation)		Gambian Air Force		c.2003?
Georgia		The Aviation and Air Defence Command of the Defence Forces თავდაცვის ძალების ავიაციისა და საჰაერო თავდაცვის სარდლობა tavdatsvis dzalebis aviatsiisa da sahaero tavdatsvis sardloba		2016
Georgia		Georgian Air Force საქართველოს სამხედრო-საჰაერო ძალები sak’art’velos samxedro-sahaero dzalebi		1991-2010
Georgia		Democratic Republic of Georgia People's Guard air detachment		1917–1920
Germany		German Air Force; Luftwaffe		1955
Germany		Air Forces of the National People's Army; Luftstreitkräfte der Nationalen Volksarmee der DDR; National People's Army		1956–1990
Germany		Volkspolizei-Luft (of the German Democratic Republic / East Germany)		1950–1956
Germany		German Air Force; Luftwaffe; Wehrmacht		1935–1945
Germany		Lipetsk fighter-pilot school		1926–1933
Germany		Marineluftschiffe-Abteilung		1912–1919
Germany		Die Marinefliegerabteilung des deutschen Kaiserreiches		1911–1919
Germany		Imperial German Army Air Service; Luftstreitkräfte (Die Fliegertruppen des deutschen Kaiserreiches)		1910–1919
Germany		former insignia		1913–1914
Germany		Heeresluftschiffe-Abteilung		1909–1917
Germany		German Naval Aviation; Marineflieger		1957
Germany		East German Navy, Naval Air Force		–1990
Germany		Imperial German Naval Air Service; Marine-Fliegerabteilung		–1918
Germany		German Army Aviation Corps; Heeresfliegertruppe		1957
Germany		Land Forces of the National People's Army Aviation		-1990
Germany		Federal Border Guards; Bundesgrezschutz		-2005
Germany		Border Troops of the German Democratic Republic		-1990
Ghana (formerly the Gold Coast)		Ghana Air Force		1959
Ghana (formerly the Gold Coast)		former insignia		1964-1966
Greece		Hellenic Air Force; Πολεμική Αεροπορία (literally "War Aviation"); Polemikì Aeroporia		1930
Greece		Greek Air Force in the Middle East		1941–1946
Greece		Royal Hellenic Air Force		1935–1973
Greece		Hellenic Army Air Service		1912–1930
Greece		Hellenic Naval Air Service		1915–1930
Greece		Hellenic Army Aviation; Αεροπορία Στρατού; Aeroporia Stratou		1947
Greece		Navy Aviation Command		2018
Greece		Hellenic Navy Helicopter Command; Διοίκηση Ελικοπτέρων Ναυτικού; Dioikisi Elikopteron Naftikou		1975-2018
Greece		Hellenic Coast Guard aviation - Paramilitary coast guard service of Greece.		
Guatemala		Guatemalan Air Force; Fuerza Aérea Guatemalteca (FAG)		1948
Guatemala		Military Aeronautical Corps; Cuerpo de Aeronáutica Militar (CAM)		1935–1948
Guatemala		Guatemalan Military Aviation Corps; Cuerpo de Aviación Militar de Guatemala (CAM)		1929–1935
Guatemala		Guatemalan Air Force; Fuerza Aérea Guatemalteca (FAG)		1921–1929
Guatemala		Army Aviation Corps; Cuerpo de Aviación de Ejército		1914–1921
Guinea		Guinea Air Force; Force Aérienne de Guinée		1959
Guinea-Bissau (formerly Portuguese Guinea)		Guinea-Bissau Air Force; Força Aérea da Guiné-Bissau		1974-2015
Guyana (formerly British Guyana)		Guyana Defence Force Air Command		1973
Guyana (formerly British Guyana)		Guyana Defence Force Air Wing		1968–1973

== H ==
Country	Current	Service Indigenous name	Former	Established
Haiti		Haiti Air Corps; Corps d'Aviation d'Garde d'Haiti		1942–1994 (2013 re-establishment)
Haiti		former insignia		1964–1986
Haiti		former insignia		1942–1964
Honduras		Honduran Air Force; Fuerza Aérea Hondureña		1954
Honduras		Air Force and Military Aviation School; Fuerza Aérea y Escuela Militar de Aviación (FAEAM)		1938–1954
Honduras		Aviation Military School; Escuela Militar de Aviación (EMA)		1931–1938
Honduras		National Aviation School; Escuela Nacional de Aviación (ENA)		1924–1931
Hungary		Hungarian Air Force; Magyar Légierő		1991
Hungary		former insignia		1990–1991
Hungary		Air Force of the Hungarian People's Army; Magyar Néphadsereg légiereje		1951–1990
Hungary		former insignia		1949–1951
Hungary		former insignia		1948–1949
Hungary		Royal Hungarian National Defense Air Force; Magyar Királyi Honvéd Légierő		1941–1945
Hungary		former insignia		1938–1941
Hungary		former insignia		1919–1923
Hungary		Red Hungarian Air Corps; Vörös Légjárócsapat		1919
Hungary		Insignia variant		
Hungary		Insignia variant		

== I ==
For Ivory Coast, see Côte d'Ivoire above.

Country	Current	Service Indigenous name	Former	Established
Iceland		Icelandic Coast Guard Aeronautical Division; Landhelgisgæsla Íslands – Flugdeild		1955
Iceland		Icelandic aircraft insignia	Iceland	
India		Indian Air Force		1932
India		Royal Indian Air Force		1947–1950
India		variant		1947–1950
India		former insignia		1942–1945
India		Indian Air Force		1932–1942
India		Army Aviation Corps		1986
India		Indian Naval Air Arm		1948
India		Indian Coast Guard Air Wing		1978
India		Indian Coast Guard aircraft insignia		
India		Border Security Force aviation Paramilitary forces of India		
Indonesia		Indonesian Air Force; Tentara Nasional Indonesia Angkatan Udara (TNI-AU)		1946
Indonesia		Republic of Indonesia Air Force; Angkatan Udara Republik Indonesia (AURI)		1946–1974
Indonesia		Republic of Indonesia Air Force; Angkatan Udara Republik Indonesia (AURI)		1946–1949
Indonesia		Indonesian Naval Aviation; Dinas Penerbangan TNI Angkatan Laut (TNI-AL)		1974
Indonesia		Indonesian Naval Aviation Service; Dinas Penerbangan Angkatan Laut RI (ALRI)		1956–1974
Indonesia		Indonesian Army Aviation Command; Pusat Penerbangan TNI Angkatan Darat (TNI-AD)		1974
Indonesia		Indonesian Army Aviation Service; Dinas Penerbangan Angkatan Darat RI (DINAS PENERBAD)		1959–1974
Iran (formerly Persia)		Air Force of the Islamic Revolutionary Guard Corps IRGC Ground Forces Aviation		1985
Iran (formerly Persia)		Islamic Republic of Iran Air Force نیروی هوایی ارتش جمهوری اسلامی ایران		1979
Iran (formerly Persia)		Imperial Iranian Air Force نیروی هوایی شاهنشاهی ایران		1932–1979
Iran (formerly Persia)		Air Officer of the Imperial Iranian Army		1922–1932
Iran (formerly Persia)		Islamic Republic of Iran Army Aviation		1979
Iran (formerly Persia)		Imperial Iranian Army Aviation		1962–1979
Iran (formerly Persia)		Islamic Republic of Iran Navy Aviation		1979
Iran (formerly Persia)		Imperial Iranian Navy Aviation		–1979
Iraq		Iraqi Air Force القوة الجوية العراقية; Al Quwwa al-Jawwiya al-Iraqiya		1931
Iraq		former insignia	Iraq	2011-2019
Iraq		Iraqi Air Force; Al Quwwa al-Jawwiya al-Iraqiya		1958-2003; 2019-
Iraq		Royal Iraqi Air Force		1931–1958
Iraq	Iraq	Iraqi Army Aviation Command		1980
Iraq		Peshmerga aviation		
Ireland		Irish Air Corps; Aer-Chór na h-Éireann		1924
Ireland		former insignia		1939–1954
Ireland		Irish National Army, Air Service		1922–1924
Israel		Israeli Defence Force / Air Force חיל האוויר; Heyl Ha'Avir		1951
Israel		Israeli Air Force; Chel Ha'Avir		1948–1951
Israel		Sherut Avir; Air Service		1947–1948
Israel		Palavir; Air Companies		1943–1947
Palestine		Force 14		late 1960s-early 2000s
Italy		Italian Air Force; Aeronautica Militare		1991-current
Italy		former insignia		1946–1991
Italy		Italian Co-Belligerent Air Force; Aviazione Cobelligerante and Aeronautica Militare Italiana		1943–1964
Italy		Aeronautica Nazionale Repubblicana		1943–1945
Italy		Royal Italian Air Force; Regia Aeronautica		1935–1943
Italy		Royal Italian Air Force; Regia Aeronautica		1923–1935
Italy		Royal Naval Aviation; Aviazione della Regia Marina		1912–1923
Italy		Military Air Corps; Corpo Aeronautico Militare; Royal Italian Army		1915–1923
Italy		Colonial Aviation Service; Servizio d'Aviazone Coloniale		1912–1915
Italy		Military Aviation Service		1912–1915
Italy		Aviation Battalion; Battaglione Aviatori		1912
Italy		Royal Army Air Service; Servizio Aeronautico		1884–1911
Italy		Italian Navy Aviation; Aviazione Navale		1956
Italy		naval aviation insignia		
Italy		Italian aircraft insignia		
Italy		Italian Army Aviation; Air Cavalry, Cavalleria dell'Aria		2000
Italy		Aviazione Leggera dell'Esercito		1951-2000
Italy		Helicopter Service of the Carabinieri Corps; Nucleo Elicotteri Carabinieri		1965
Italy		Italian Coast Guard Air Service; Italian Navy		1989
Italy		Guardia di Finanza; Finance Guard - Paramilitary border guard and customs service of Italy.		
Ivory Coast (Côte d'Ivoire)		Côte d'Ivoire Air Force; Force Aérienne de la Côte d'Ivoire		c. 1965

== J ==
Country	Current	Service Indigenous name	Former	Established
Jamaica		Jamaica Defence Force		1963
Japan		Japan Air Self-Defense Force 航空自衛隊 Kōkū Jieitai		1954
Japan		Imperial Japanese Army Air Force 大日本帝国陸軍航空隊 Dai-Nippon Teikoku Rikugun Kōkū tai		1912–1945
Japan		Imperial Japanese Naval Air Service 大日本帝国海軍航空隊 Dai-Nippon Teikoku Kaigun Kōkū tai		1912–1945
Japan		Fleet Air Force (JMSDF) 海上自衛隊 Kaijō Jieitai		1954
Japan		Japan Ground Self-Defense Force 陸上自衛隊 Rikujō Jieitai		1954
Japan		Japan Coast Guard - Paramilitary coast guard service of Japan.		
Jordan (formerly Transjordan)		Royal Jordanian Air Force سلاح الجو الملكي الأردني; Al Quwwat al-Jawwiya Almalakiya al-Urduniya		1955
Jordan (formerly Transjordan)		Arab Legion Air Force		1949–1955

== K ==
Country	Current	Service Indigenous name	Former	Established
Kazakhstan		Kazakh Air Defense Forces; Áue qurǵanysy kúshteri / Әуе қорғанысы күштері		1992
Kenya		Kenya Air Force; Jeshi la Anga la Kenya		1994
Kenya		The Kenya '82 Air Force		1982–1994
Kenya		Kenya Army Aviation		
Korea (DPRK/“North Korea”)		Korean People's Army Air Force 조선인민군 공군 (朝鮮人民軍空軍); Chosŏn-inmin'gun Konggun		1945
Korea (ROK/“South Korea”)		Republic of Korea Air Force 대한민국 공군 (大韓民國空軍); Daehan Minguk Gonggun		1949
Korea (ROK/“South Korea”)		former insignia		1951–2000
Korea (ROK/“South Korea”)		Willows Korean Aviation School		1920–1921
Korea (ROK/“South Korea”)		Republic of Korea Navy, Air Wing Six		1986
Korea (ROK/“South Korea”)		Fleet Aviation Unit		1977–1986
Korea (ROK/“South Korea”)		Republic of Korea Army aviation		1965
Korea (ROK/“South Korea”)		Korea Coast Guard - Paramilitary coast guard service of South Korea.		
Kuwait		Kuwait Air Force القوات الجوية الكويتية; Al-Quwwat al-Jawwiya al-Kuwaitiya		1991
Kuwait		Free Kuwait Air Force		1990–1991
Kuwait		Kuwait Air Force		1960–1990
Kuwait		Directorate of Public Security, Air Wing		1954–1960
Kyrgyzstan		Kyrgyz Air Force; Кыргыз Республикасы Аскер-аба күчтөрү		1992

== L ==
Country	Current	Service Indigenous name	Former	Established
Laos		Lao People's Liberation Army Air Force ກອງທັບອາກາດປະຊາຊົນລາວ; Kongthap Akat Paxaxon Lao		1975
Laos		former insignia	Laos	1975–
Laos		Royal Lao Air Force; Aviation Royale Laotienne; Royal Lao Armed Forces		1960–1975
Laos		Laotian Aviation; Aviation Laotienne		1955–1960
Latvia		Latvian Air Force; Latvijas Gaisa Spēki		1991
Latvia		Latvian Air Force; Latvijas Gaisa Spēki		1919–1940
Latvia		Aviation component of the Latvian National Guard		1993–2000
Latvia		Aviation Regiment of the Aizsargi		1937–1940
Latvia		State Border Guard aviation - Armed border guard service of Latvia.		
Lebanon		Lebanese Air Force القوات الجوية اللبنانية; Al Quwwat al-Jawwiya al-Lubnania, Force Aérienne Libanaise		1949
Lesotho (formerly Basutoland)		Lesotho Defence Force – Air Squadron		c. 1988
Lesotho (formerly Basutoland)		former insignia		1987–2006
Lesotho (formerly Basutoland)		Lesotho Police Mobile Unit – Air Wing		1978–1988
Liberia		Liberian Army Air Wing		1987
Liberia		Liberian Army Air Reconnaissance Unit		1970s–1980s
Libya		Libyan Air Force القوة الجوية الليبية; Al-quwwa al-jawwiyya al-libyya		2011–current date
Libya		Free Libyan Air Force; Al Quwwat al Jawwiya al Libiyya al Hurra		2011
Libya		Air Force of the Libyan Arab Jamahiriya		1977-2011
Libya		Libyan Arab Republic Air Force		1969–1977
Libya		Royal Libyan Air Force; Al Quwwat al Jawwiya al Malakiya al Libiyya		1951–1969
Lithuania		Lithuanian Air Force; Karinės Oro Pajėgos		1922–1940, 1992
Lithuania		Lithuanian Military Aviation		1920–1921
Lithuania		former insignia		1919–1920
Lithuania		Lithuanian National Defence Volunteer Forces, Aviation Unit		1992
Lithuania		Lithuanian State Border Guard Service aviation Lithuanian Armed Forces wartime only		
Luxembourg		Luxembourg Army Aviation		1952–1968

== M ==
Country	Current	Service Indigenous name	Former	Established
North Macedonia		Air Force of North Macedonia; Военно Воздухопловство и Противвоздушна Одбрана; Voeno Vozduhoplovstvo i Protivvozdushna Odbrana		1992
North Macedonia		former insignia		early 1990s
Madagascar (formerly the Malagasy Republic)		Malagasy Air Force; Tafika Anabakabaka Malagasy; Armée de l'Air Malgache		1961
Malawi (formerly Nyasaland)		Malawi Army Air Wing		1976
Malawi (formerly Nyasaland)		former aircraft insignia		2010-2012
Malawi (formerly Nyasaland)		Malawi Young Pioneers Air Arm		1970–1978
Malaysia (formerly Malaya)		Royal Malaysian Air Force; Tentera Udara Diraja Malaysia		1963
Malaysia (formerly Malaya)		insignia variant		
Malaysia (formerly Malaya)		Royal Malayan Air Force; Tentera Udara Diraja Persekutuan		1958–1963
Malaysia (formerly Malaya)		Malayan Auxiliary Air Force		1950–1958
Malaysia (formerly Malaya)		Malayan Volunteer Air Force		1940–1950
Malaysia (formerly Malaya)		Royal Malaysian Navy Aviation		1988
Malaysia (formerly Malaya)		Malaysian Army Aviation; Pasukan Udara Tentera Darat		1994
Malaysia (formerly Malaya)		Malaysian Maritime Enforcement Agency - Paramilitary coast guard service of Malaysia.		
Maldives		MNDF Air Corps; Maldives National Defence Force		2024
Mali		Malian Air Force; Force Aérienne de la Republique du Mali		1961
Malta		Air Wing of the Armed Forces of Malta; Skwadra tal-Ajru tal-Forzi Armati ta' Malta		1992
Malta		former insignia		1980–1988
Mauritania		Mauritania Islamic Air Force; Force Aérienne de la Republique Islamique de Mauritanie		1960
Mauritania		former aircraft insignia		1960-2019
Mauritius		Military of Mauritius		1987
Mexico		Mexican Air Force; Fuerza Aérea Mexicana		1915
Mexico		Mexican Naval Aviation; Fuerza Aeronaval		1926
Mexico		Maritime Search and Rescue (Mexico); Mexican Navy		
Mexico		National Guard (Mexico) aviation - national gendarmerie force of Mexico.		
Mexico		Federal Police (Mexico) aviation - Defunct National police and gendarmerie service of Mexico.		-2009
Moldova		Moldovan Air Force; Forțele Aeriene ale Republicii Moldova		1991
Mongolia		Mongolian Air Force; Агаарын Довтолгооноос Хамгаалах Цэргийн Командлал		1993-presents
Mongolia		Mongolian People's Army Air Force; Монголын Ардын Армийн Нисэх Хүчин		1925–1992
Montenegro		Montenegrin Air Force; Vazdušne snage Crne Gore		2006
Montenegro		former insignia		2006-2018
Morocco		Royal Moroccan Air Force القوة الجوية الملكية المغربية; Al-quwwa al-jawwiya al-malikiyya al-maghribiyya ⴰⴷⵡⴰⵙ ⴰⴳⴻⵍⴷⴰⵏ ⴰⵎⴻⵔⵔⵓⴽⴰⵏ ⵓⵊⴻⵏⵏⴰ (Force Aérienne Royale Marocaine)		1963
Morocco		Sherifan Royal Aviation; Aviation Royale Chérifienne		1956–1963
Morocco		Royal Moroccan Navy, Aviation		
Morocco		Royal Moroccan Gendarmerie		1962
Mozambique		Mozambique Air Force; Força Aérea de Moçambique		c.1976/77?
Mozambique		People's Liberation Air Force of Mozambique; Força Populare Aérea de Libertação de Moçambique		1975–c.1976/77?
Myanmar (formerly Burma)		Myanmar Air Force တပ်မတော် လေ Tatmdaw Lei		1989
Myanmar (formerly Burma)		Burmese Air Force		1947–1989

== N ==
Country	Current	Service Indigenous name	Former	Established
Namibia (formerly South West Africa)		Namibian Air Force		2005
Namibia (formerly South West Africa)		Namibia Defence Force Air Wing		1994–2005
Namibia (formerly South West Africa)		South West African Territorial Force, Air Wing		1980–1989
NATO		Allied Air Command		2013
Nepal		Nepalese Army Air Service नेपाली सैनिक हवाई सेवा Nēpālī sainika hawai sēvā		c.2008
Nepal		Royal Nepal Army Air Wing		1979–c.2007
Nepal		Royal Nepal Army Air Service		1965–1979
Netherlands		Royal Netherlands Air Force; Koninklijke Luchtmacht		1953
Netherlands		Free Dutch Air Force	Netherlands	1940–1945
Netherlands		Army Aviation Brigade; Luchtvaartbrigade		1939–1940
Netherlands		former insignia		1921–1940
Netherlands		Army Aviation Group; Luchtvaartafdeling		1913–1939
Netherlands		Dutch Naval Aviation Service; Marineluchtvaartdienst		1917
Netherlands		former insignia	Netherlands	1942–c.1945
Netherlands		former insignia		1939–1942
Netherlands		former insignia		1921–1940
Netherlands		former insignia		1917–1921
Netherlands		Netherlands Coastguard; Royal Netherlands Navy		
(Netherlands) Dutch Caribbean		Dutch Caribbean Coast Guard; Royal Netherlands Navy		
New Zealand		Royal New Zealand Air Force; Te Tauaarangi o Aotearoa		1937
New Zealand		former insignia		1943–1946
New Zealand		former insignia		1939–1945
New Zealand		New Zealand Territorial Air Force		1930–1957
New Zealand		New Zealand Permanent Air Force		1923–1934
New Zealand		New Zealand Army Flying Corps		1913–1923
Nicaragua		Nicaraguan Army Air Force; Fuerza Aérea – Ejército de Nicaragua		1996
Nicaragua		Sandinista Air Force; Fuerza Aérea Sandinista		1979–1996
Nicaragua		Air Force of Nicaragua; Fuerza Aérea de Nicaragua		c.1950–1979
Nicaragua		former insignia (fuselage)		1962–1979
Nicaragua		Guard Air Force of Nicaragua; Fuerza Aérea Guardia de Nicaragua		c.1947–c.1950
Nicaragua		former insignia (wings)		1938–1962
Nicaragua		Air Force of the National Guard; Fuerza Aérea de la Guardia Nacional		1938–c.1947
Nicaragua		Air Corps of the National Guard; Cuerpo de Aviación de la Guardia Nacional		1936–1938
Nicaragua		Military Aviation Corps; Cuerpo Militar de Aviación		1926–1936
Nicaragua		National Guard; Guardia Nacional		1920–1926
Niger		National Squadron of Niger; Escadrille Nationale du Niger		2003
Niger		Niger Air Force; Force Aérienne du Niger		1961–2003?
Nigeria		Nigerian Air Force		1964
Nigeria		insignia variant		
Nigeria		Nigerian Navy, Air Arm		1985
Nigeria		Nigerian Army Aviation Corps		2024
Norway		Royal Norwegian Air Force; Luftforsvaret		1944
Norway		Free Norwegian Air Force		1940–1944
Norway		Norwegian Army Air Service; Hærens Flyvevesen		1914–1944
Norway		Royal Norwegian Navy Air Service; Marinens Flyvevesen		1912–1944

== O ==
Country	Current	Service Indigenous name	Former	Established
Oman (formerly Muscat and Oman)		Royal Air Force of Oman (RAFO) سلاح الجو السلطاني عمان; Al Quwwat al-Jawwiya al-Sultanya al-Omanya		1990
Oman (formerly Muscat and Oman)		Sultan of Oman's Air Force (SOAF)		1959–1990

== P ==
Country	Current	Service Indigenous name	Former	Established
Pakistan		Pakistan Air Force پاک فضائيہ		1956
Pakistan		Royal Pakistan Air Force		1947–1956
Pakistan		Pakistan Army Aviation Corps		1958
Pakistan		Pakistan Naval Air Arm		1971
Panama		Panamanian National Aeronaval Service; Panama Servicio Aéreo Nacional		1989
Panama		Panamaian Air Force; Fuerza Aérea Panama		1969–1989
Papua New Guinea		Papua New Guinea Air Wing		1990s
Papua New Guinea		Papua New Guinea Defence Force, Air Transport Wing		1975–1990s
Paraguay		Paraguayan Air Force; Fuerza Aérea Paraguaya		1946
Paraguay		Paraguaryan Army Aviation Corps		1920s–1940s
Paraguay		Paraguayan Naval Aviation; Aviación Naval Paraguaya		1980
Peru		Peruvian Air Force; Fuerza Aérea del Perú		1950
Peru		Peruvian Aeronautical Corps; Cuerpo Aeronáutico del Perú		1936–1950
Peru		Peruvian Aviation Corps; Cuerpo de Aviación del Perú		1929–1936
Peru		Peruvian Naval Aviation; Fuerza Aviación Naval		1980
Peru		Aeronaval Service; Servicio Aeronaval		1963–1980
Peru		Peruvian Army, Aviation; Aviación del Ejército		1977
Peru		Army Light Aviation Group; Grupo de Aviación Ligera del Ejército		1973–1977
Peru		Peruvian Coast Guard; Peruvian Navy		
Philippines		Philippine Air Force ᜑᜒᜃ᜔ᜊᜒᜅ᜔ ᜑᜒᜋ᜔ᜉᜉᜏᜒᜇ᜔ ᜈᜅ᜔ ᜉᜒᜎᜒᜉᜒᜈᜐ᜔ Hukbong Himpapawid ng Pilipinas		1947
Philippines		Philippine Army Air Corps		1936–1947
Philippines		Philippine Constabulary Air Corps		1935–1936
Philippines		Philippine National Guard Aviation		1917–1935
Philippines		Philippine Navy Naval Air Wing		2019
Philippines		Philippine Navy Naval Air Group		1975–2019
Philippines		Philippine Army Aviation Regiment		2019
Philippines		Philippine Army Aviation Battalion		1980–2019
Philippines		Philippine Coast Guard Aviation Force		1998
Philippines		Philippine Coast Guard racing stripe		
Philippines		Philippine National Police Special Action Force Air Unit		
Poland		Polish Air Force; Siły Powietrzne Rzeczypospolitej Polskiej		2004
Poland		Air and Air Defence Forces; Wojska Lotnicze i Obrony Powietrznej		1993–2004
Poland				1990–1993
Poland		Air Force; Wojska Lotnicze		1962–1990
Poland		Polish Air Defence Force of Country; Wojska Obrony Powietrznej Kraju		1962–1990
Poland		Air and Air Defence Forces of Country; Wojska Lotnicze i Obrony Przeciwlotniczej Obszaru Kraju		1954–1962
Poland		Air Force; Wojska Lotnicze		1947–1954
Poland		Air Force of the Polish Army; Lotnictwo Wojska Polskiego; Polish People's Army		1945–1947
Poland		Air Force of the Polish Army; Lotnictwo Wojska Polskiego; Polish Armed Forces in the East		1943–1945
Poland		Polish Air Forces in France and Great Britain; Polish Armed Forces in the West		1939–1946
Poland		Air Force; Wojska Lotnicze; Polish Armed Forces (Second Polish Republic)		1918–1939
Poland		I Polish Corps in Russia Aviation; Russian Army (1917)		1917–1918
Poland		Polish Army Aviation; Lotnictwo Wojsk Lądowych		1994
Poland		Polish Naval Aviation; Lotnictwo Marynarki Wojennej		1947
Poland		Polish Border Guards - Paramilitary border guard service of Poland.		1990
Portugal		Portuguese Air Force; Força Aérea Portuguesa		1952
Portugal		Military Aeronautics Arm; Arma da Aeronáutica Militar		1924–1952
Portugal				1918–1924
Portugal		Military Aeronautical Service; Serviço Aeronáutico Militar		1914–1918
Portugal		Balloon Company; Companhia de Aerosteiros		1911–1914
Portugal		Portuguese Naval Aviation; Esquadrilha de Helicópteros da Marinha		1993
Portugal		Aeronaval Forces; Forças Aeronavais		1952–1957
Portugal		Navy Air Forces; Forças Aéreas da Armada		1931–1952
Portugal		Naval Aeronautics Service; Serviço da Aeronáutica Naval		1918–1931
Portugal		Navy Aviation Service; Serviço de Aviação da Armada		1917–1918
Portugal		Portuguese Army Light Aviation Unit; Unidade de Aviacão Ligeira do Exército		2000-2015

== Q ==
Country	Current	Service Indigenous name	Former	Established
Qatar		Qatar Emiri Air Force القوات الجوية الأميرية القطرية		1974
Qatar		Qatar Public Security Forces Air Wing		1968–1974

== R ==
Country	Current	Service Indigenous name	Former	Established
Romania		Romanian Air Force; Forțele Aeriene Române		1989
Romania				1985–1989
Romania		Military Air Forces; Forțele Aeriene Militare		1949–1985
Romania				1944–1949
Romania		Romanian Royal Aeronautics; Aeronautica Regală Română		1941–1944
Romania				1924–1941
Romania		Romanian Air Corps; Corpul de Aviație Român		1915–1924
Romania		Military Aeronautics Service; Serviciul de Aeronautică Militară		1913–1915
Romania		Military Aerostation; Aerostația Militară		1893–1913
Romania		Romanian Naval Aviation		2006
Romania		naval aviation insignia		
Romania				1949–1960
Romania		Seaplane Flotilla; Flotila de Hidroaviație		1930–1949
Romania				1941–1944
Romania		Maritime Air Corps; Corpul de Aviație Maritimă		1920–1930
Romania		General Inspectorate of Aviation; Inspectoratul General de Aviație - militarized institution of the Ministry of Internal Affairs		2008
Romania		Special Aviation Unit; Unitatea Specială de Aviație		1978-2008
Russia		Russian Air Force; Военно-воздушные cилы России; Voyenno-Vozdushnye Sily Rossii		2010
Russia		Russian Air Defence Force		1991-2008
Russia		Soviet Air Defence Force; Soviet Armed Forces		1948–1991
Russia		Soviet Air Forces; Военно-воздушные силы Voenno-Vozdushnye Sily; Soviet Armed Forces		1918–1991
Russia				1922–1943
Russia		Imperial Russian Air Service; Императорский военно-воздушный флот Pre-reform Russian:Императорскій военно-воздушный флотъ		1910–1917
Russia		Russian Naval Aviation; Авиация Военно-Морского Флота; Aviatsiya Voyenno-Morskogo Flota		2010
Russia				1991-2010
Russia		Soviet Naval Aviation		1918–1991
Russia				1922–1943
Russia		Russian Army Aviation		1992-2010s
Russia		Soviet Army Aviation		1970s–1991
Russia		National Guard of Russia		
Russia		Border Service of the Federal Security Service of the Russian Federation		1992
Russia		Soviet Border Troops aviation		–1992
Rwanda (formerly Ruanda-Urundi)		Rwandan Air Force; Force Aérienne Rwandaise		2001
Rwanda (formerly Ruanda-Urundi)				1972-2001

== S ==
Country	Current	Service Indigenous name	Former	Established
Saudi Arabia		Royal Saudi Air Force القوات الجوية الملكية السعودية; Al-Quwwāt al-Jawwiyyah al-Malakiyyah as-Suʿūdiyyah		1950
Saudi Arabia		Hejaz Air Force		1921–1932
Saudi Arabia		Royal Saudi Naval Aviation		1985
Saudi Arabia		Royal Saudi Land Forces Aviation		1990s
Saudi Arabia		General Security Aviation Command		1975
Saudi Arabia		Saudi Arabian National Guard, Aviation		2011
Senegal (formerly part of the Senegambia Confederation)		Senegalese Air Force; Armée de l'Air du Sénégal		1989
Senegal (formerly part of the Senegambia Confederation)		Senegambia Air Force; Armée de l'Air du Sénegambia		1982–1989
Senegal (formerly part of the Senegambia Confederation)		Senegalese Air Force; Armée de l'Air du Senégal		1961–1982
Serbia		Serbian Air Force and Air Defence; Ратно ваздухопловство и противваздухопловна одбрана Војске Србије; Ratno vazduhoplovstvo i protivvazduhoplovna odbrana Vojske Srbije		2006
Serbia		Air Force of Serbia and Montenegro; Ратно ваздухопловство и противваздушна одбрана Војске Србије и Црне Горе; Ratno vazduhoplovstvo i protivvazdušna odbrana Vojske Srbije i Crne Gore		2003–2006
Serbia		Air Force of FR Yugoslavia; Ратно ваздухопловство и противваздушна одбрана Војске Југославије; Ratno vazduhoplovstvo i protivvazdušna odbrana Vojske Jugoslavije		1992–2003
Serbia		Royal Yugoslav Army Air Force; Ваздухопловство војске Краљевине Југославије; Vazduhoplovstvo vojske Kraljevine Jugoslavije		1929–1941
Serbia		Yugoslav Royal Army Aviation Department; Авиацијско Одељење Југословенске Краљевске Армије; Aviacijsko Odeljenje Jugoslovenske Kraljevske Armije		1918–1929
Serbia		Serbian Aviation; Српска Авијатика; Srpska Avijatika		1915–1918
Serbia		Air Force Command; Ваздухопловна Команда; Vazduhoplovna Komanda		1912–1915
Serbia		Royal Yugoslav Navy, Naval Air Service		–1941
Seychelles		Seychelles People's Defence Force Air Wing (part of the Seychelles People's Defence Force)		2008
Seychelles		Seychelles Defence Force Air Wing		1978
Sierra Leone		Sierra Leone Defence Force Air Force; Ripɔblik fɔ Siera Liɔn Am Fɔs		1973
Singapore	[[Image:|25px]]	Republic of Singapore Air Force; Angkatan Udara Republik Singapura 新加坡空军部队 சிங்கப்பூர் ஆகாயப்படை		1975
Singapore		Singapore Air Defence Command		1968–1975
Singapore		former insignia		1968–1973
Singapore		Singapore Wing, Malayan Auxiliary Air Force		1950–1960
Singapore		Straits Settlements Volunteer Air Force		1936–1941
Slovakia		Slovak Air Force; Vzdušné sily Slovenskej republiky		1993
Slovakia		Slovak Insurgent Air Force; Slovenské povstalecké letectvo		August–October 1944
Slovakia		Slovak Air Force; Slovenské vzdušné zbrane		1939–1945
Slovakia		former insignia		1939–1940
Slovenia		Slovenian Air Force and Air Defence; Brigada zračne Obrambe in Letalstva Slovenske Vojske		2004
Slovenia		15th Aviation Brigade; Slovenian Armed Forces		1995-2004
Slovenia		15th Aviation Brigade; Slovenian Territorial Defence Force		1991–1995
Slovenia		Slovenian Air Force upon the break-away from the Habsburg Empire		1918–1919
Somalia		Somali Air Force القوات الجوية الصومالية; Ciidamada Cirka Soomaaliyeed		1960
Somalia		Somali Aeronautical Corps; Ciidamada Cirka Soomaaliyeed; Corpo di Sicurezza della Somalia		1954–1968
Somalia		Puntland Maritime Police Force; Somali Navy		
South Africa		South African Air Force (SAAF); Suid-Afrikaanse Lugmag		1920
South Africa				1982-2003
South Africa		South African Air Force; South African Defence Force		1958–1981
South Africa				1947–1957
South Africa		South African Air Force; Union Defence Force (South Africa)		1924–1947
South Africa		former insignia		1920–1921
South Africa		South African Aviation Corps		1915–1920
South Sudan		South Sudan Air Force		2011
Spain		Spanish Air and Space Force (SASF); Ejército del Aire y del Espacio		2022
Spain		Spanish Air Force (SPAF); Ejército del Aire		1939-2022
Spain		Nationalist Air Force; Aviación Nacional		1936–1939
Spain		Nationalist Air Force insignia (wings)		1937–1939
Spain		Nationalist Air Force insignia variant		1936–1939
Spain		Spanish Republican Air Force; Fuerzas Aéreas de la República Española (FARE); Spanish Republican Armed Forces		1936–1939
Spain		Military Aviation; Aeronáutica Militar Española		1931–1936
Spain		Military Aviation; Aeronáutica Militar Española		1911–1931
Spain		Military Aerostatics Service; Servicio Militar de Aerostacion		1896–1911
Spain		Spanish Army Airmobile Force; Fuerzas Aeromóviles del Ejército de Tierra (FAMET)		1973
Spain		Army Light Air Force; Aviacion Ligera del Ejercito de Tierra		1965–1973
Spain		Spanish Navy Air Arm; Arma Aérea de la Armada		1954
Spain		Naval Aviation; Aeronáutica Naval		1931–1936
Spain		Naval Aviation; Aeronáutica Naval		1917–1931
Spain		Civil Guard Aviation; Guardia Civil - Under the authority of both the Ministry of Defence and Ministry of the Interior.		
Sri Lanka (formerly Ceylon)		Sri Lanka Air Force ශ්රි ලංකා ගුවන් හමුදාව; Sri Lanka Guwan Hamudawa		1972
Sri Lanka (formerly Ceylon)		Royal Ceylon Air Force රාජකීය ලංකා ගුවන් හමුදාව; Rajakeeya Lanka Guwan Hamudawa		1951–1972
Sudan (formerly the Anglo-Egyptian Sudan)		Sudanese Air Force القوّات الجوّيّة السودانيّة; Al Quwwat al-Jawwiya As-Sudaniya		1956
Sudan (formerly the Anglo-Egyptian Sudan)		former insignia		1956–1970
Suriname (formerly Dutch Guyana)		Suriname Air Force; Surinaamse Luchtmacht		1982
Suriname (formerly Dutch Guyana)		former insignia	Suriname	1982–1990s
Sweden		Swedish Air Force; Svenska Flygvapnet		1926
Sweden		former insignia		1937–1940
Sweden		Swedish Air Force; Svenska Flygvapnet		1926–1937
Sweden		Swedish Armed Forces Helicopter Wing; Försvarsmaktens helikopterflottilj		1998-2003
Sweden		Swedish Army Aviation; Arméflyget		1954–1998
Sweden		former insignia		1914–1915
Sweden		Aircraft Coy of the Signal Corps; Flygkompaniet		1912–1926
Sweden		Swedish Naval Aviation; Marinflyget		1958–1998
Sweden		Naval Air Service; Marinens Flygväsen		1911–1926
Sweden		Swedish Volunteer Air Corps; Home Guard (Sweden), Swedish Armed Forces		1961
Switzerland		Swiss Air Force; Schweizer Luftwaffe; Forces Aériennes Suisses; Forze Aeree Svizzere		1946
Switzerland		Lufttransportdienst des Bundes		1938-2005
Switzerland		Independent service under the Swiss Federal Military Department; Schweizerische Flugwaffe	Switzerland	1936–1946
Switzerland		Swiss Army Aviation; Schweizerische Fliegertruppe	Switzerland	1914–1936
Syria		Syrian Air Force الْقُوَّاتُ الْجَوِّيَّةُ السُّورِيَّةُ al-Quwwāt al-Jawwīyah al-Sūrīyah		2024
Syria		Syrian Arab Air Force القوات الجوية العربية السورية; Al Quwwat al-Jawwiya al Arabiya as-Souriya; Syrian Arab Armed Forces (Baꞌathist Syria)		1961-2024
Syria		former insignia		1972–1980
Syria		former insignia		1963–1972
Syria		United Arab Republic Air Force; Armed Forces of the United Arab Republic		1958–1961
Syria		Syrian Air Force		1948–1958
Syria		Syrian Arab Navy (Baꞌathist Syria)		2025

== T ==
Country	Current	Service Indigenous name	Former	Established
Taiwan (Republic of China)		Republic of China Air Force 中華民國空軍; Chung-Hua Min-Kuo K'ung-Chün		1938
Taiwan (Republic of China)		Nationalist Chinese Air Force (Central Government)		1925–1938
Taiwan (Republic of China)		Chinese Aviation Ministry		1920–1925?
Taiwan (Republic of China)		Chinese Aviation Service		1916?–1919?
Taiwan (Republic of China)		Chinese Army Air Arm		1914–1916?
Taiwan (Republic of China)		Airplane Corps of the Chinese Army		1913–1914
Taiwan (Republic of China)		Republic of China Army Aviation and Special Forces Command		1999
Taiwan (Republic of China)		Army Paratroops and Special Forces Command		1979–1999
Taiwan (Republic of China)		Army Aviation Command		1976–1979
Taiwan (Republic of China)		Republic of China Naval Aviation Command		1995
Taiwan (Republic of China)		Naval Anti-Submarine Group		1991–1995
Taiwan (Republic of China)		Fleet Helicopter Squadron		1977–1991
Taiwan (Republic of China)		Chinese Naval Air Service		1927–1938
Taiwan (Republic of China)		Coast Guard Administration (Taiwan), Air Patrol Squadron - Paramilitary coast guard service of Taiwan		-2004
Tajikistan		Tajik Air Force; Қувваҳои ҳавоӣ ва мудофиаи Тоҷикистон; Quvvahoi Havoī va Mudofiai Tojikiston		2006
Tanzania (formerly Tanganyika)		Tanzania Air Force Command; Jeshi la Anga la Wananchi wa Tanzania		1964
Tanzania (formerly Tanganyika)		former insignia		1964-2010
Thailand (formerly Siam)		Royal Thai Air Force กองทัพอากาศไทย; Kongthap Akat Thai		1937
Thailand (formerly Siam)		Former marking		1942–1945
Thailand (formerly Siam)		Former marking		1940–1941
Thailand (formerly Siam)		Royal Siamese Air Force Division กรมทหารอากาศ; Krom Tahan Akat		1935–1937
Thailand (formerly Siam)		Royal Siamese Air Division กรมอากาศยาน; Krom Akatsayan		1921–1935
Thailand (formerly Siam)		Siamese Army Aviation Division กรมอากาศยานทหารบก; Krom Akatsayan Tahan Bok		1917–1921
Thailand (formerly Siam)		Siamese Army Aviation Unit กองบินทหารบก; Kong Bin Tahan Bok	Thailand 1855	1914–1917
Thailand (formerly Siam)		Royal Thai Army Aviation Center กองบินทหารบกไทย; Kong Bin Tahan Bok Thai		1977
Thailand (formerly Siam)		Royal Thai Naval Air Division กองการบินทหารเรือไทย; Kongkanbin Tahan Ruea Thai		1921
Timor-Leste		Timor-Leste Defence Force Light Air Component; Forcas Defesa Timor Lorosae Komponente Aérea Leijeira; Forças de Defesa de Timor Leste Componente Aérea Ligeira		2018
Tonga		Tongan Air Wing		1996
Togo		Togolese Air Force; Force Aérienne Togolaise		1964
Trinidad and Tobago		Trinidad and Tobago Defence Force Air Guard		2005
Trinidad and Tobago		Trinidad and Tobago Defence Force Air Wing		1977-2005
Trinidad and Tobago		Air Wing of the Trinidad and Tobago Defence Force Coast Guard		1966–1977
Tunisia		Tunisian Air Force القوات الجوية التونسية; Al Quwwat al-Jawwiya At'Tunisia		1959
Tunisia		Tunisian National Guard aviation - National gendarmerie force of Tunisia.		
Turkey		Turkish Air Force; Türk Hava Kuvvetleri		1944
Turkey		former insignia		1944–1972
Turkey		Undersecretariat of Military Aviation; Hava Müsteşarlığı		1928-1944
Turkey		Air Force Inspectorate; Hava Kuvvetleri Müfettişliği		1922-1928
Turkey		Air Force General Directorate; Kuva-yı Havaiye Müdüriyet-i Umumiyesi		1921-1922
Turkey		Air Force Department; Kuva-yı Havaiye Şubesi		1920-1921
Turkey		Turkish Army Aviation Command; Kara Kuvvetleri Havacılık Komutanlığı		1957
Turkey		School of Army Aviation (Turkey)		1948-1957
Turkey		Naval Forces Aviation Command; Deniz Kuvvetleri Havacılık Komutanlığı		1971
Turkey		aviation insignia		
Turkey		Coast Guard Aviation Command; Sahil Güvenlik Havacılık Komutanlığı		1993
Turkey		aviation insignia		
Turkey		Gendarmerie Aviation Command; Jandarma Havacılık Komutanlığı		1968
Turkey		aviation insignia		
Turkmenistan		Turkmen Air Force; Türkmen Howa Güýçleri		1991
Turkmenistan		former insignia		1991-2011

== U ==
Country	Current	Service Indigenous name	Former	Established
Uganda		Uganda Air Force		2005
Uganda		Uganda Police Air Wing		1964–1987
Uganda		Uganda Army Air Force		1964-1987
Ukraine		Ukraine Air Force; Військово-Повітряні Сили України Viys'kovo-Povitriani Syly Ukrayiny		1992
Ukraine		Ukrainian Air Defence Forces		1992-2004
Ukraine		Air Fleet of the Revolutionary Insurgent Army of Ukraine; Revolutionary Insurgent Army of Ukraine		1918-1921
Ukraine		Ukrainian People's Republic Air Fleet; Ukrainian People's Army		1917-1921
Ukraine		Ukrainian Naval Aviation; Авіація Військово-Морських Сил Aviatsiya Viys'kovo-Mors'kykh Syl		1992
Ukraine		Ukrainian Army Aviation		1992
Ukraine		Ukrainian Defense Intelligence Aviation		2023
Ukraine		Air National Guard (Ukraine)		1992
Ukraine		State Border Guard Service of Ukraine Aviation		2003
United Arab Emirates		United Arab Emirates Air Force القوات الجوية والدفاع الجوي الاماراتي		1976
United Arab Emirates		Sharjah Amiri Guard Air Wing		1984-1997
United Arab Emirates		Dubai Defence Force Air Wing		1974-1976
United Arab Emirates		Dubai Police Air Wing		1971-1974
United Arab Emirates		Abu Dhabi Air Force		1972-1976
United Arab Emirates		Abu Dhabi Defence Force Air Wing		1968-1972
United Arab Emirates		United Arab Emirates Navy, Aviation		
United Kingdom		Royal Air Force		1918
United Kingdom		insignia variant		
United Kingdom		former insignia		1942-1947
United Kingdom		former insignia		1942-1945
United Kingdom		Royal Air Force		1918-1937
United Kingdom		former insignia		1915-1918
United Kingdom		Royal Flying Corps	United Kingdom	1912-1915
United Kingdom		Air Battalion of the Royal Engineers		1911-1912
United Kingdom		School of Ballooning		1888-1911
United Kingdom		Fleet Air Arm		1937
United Kingdom		insignia variant		
United Kingdom		former insignia		1944-1945
United Kingdom		former insignia		1942-1947
United Kingdom		former insignia		1937-1942
United Kingdom		Fleet Air Arm of the RAF		1924-1937
United Kingdom		Royal Naval Air Service		1914-1918
United Kingdom		Naval Wing of the Royal Flying Corps		1912-1914
United Kingdom		Army Air Corps		1957
United Kingdom		Glider Pilot Regiment		1941-1957
United Kingdom		3 Commando Brigade Air Squadron; Royal Marines		1968-1995
United States		United States Air Force		1947
United States				1947–
United States		United States Army Air Forces		1941-1947
United States		former insignia		1943
United States		former insignia		1943
United States		former insignia		1942-1943
United States		United States Army Air Corps		1926-1941
United States		United States Army Air Service		1918-1926
United States		Division of Military Aeronautics		20–24 May 1918
United States		former insignia		1917-1919
United States		Aviation Section, U.S. Signal Corps		1914-1918
United States		Aeronautical Division, U.S. Signal Corps		1907-1914
United States		Union Army Balloon Corps		1861-1863
United States		United States Army Aviation Branch		1983
United States		Army Aviation		1947-1983
United States		United States Navy, Naval Air Forces		1911
United States		former insignia		1943
United States		former insignia		1917-1918
United States		Naval Flying Corps		1916-1917
United States		United States Marine Corps Aviation		1912
United States		United States Coast Guard		1916
United States		US Coast Guard racing stripe		
Uruguay		Uruguayan Air Force; Fuerza Aérea Uruguaya		1953
Uruguay		Military Air Force; Fuerza Aérea Militar		1952-1953
Uruguay		Uruguayan Military Aviation; Aeronáutica Militar Uruguaya		1935-1952
Uruguay		Military School of Aeronautics; Escuela Militar de Aeronáutica		1916-1935
Uruguay		Military Aviation School; Escuela de Aviación Militar		1913-1916
Uruguay		Uruguayan Naval Aviation; Aviación Naval Uruguaya		1951
Uruguay		Naval Air Service; Servicio Aeronáutico		1925–1951
Uzbekistan		Uzbekistan Air and Air Defence Forces; Havo hujumidan mudofaa qoʻshinlari va Harbiy havo kuchlari		1992

== V ==
Country	Current	Service Indigenous name	Former	Established
Venezuela		Venezuelan Air Force; Aviación Militar Bolivariana		2006
Venezuela		Venezuelan Military Aviation; Aviación Militar de Venezuela		2001–2006
Venezuela		Venezuelan Air Force; Fuerza Aérea Venezolana		1946–2001
Venezuela		Army Aeronautical Service; Servicio de Aeronáutica del Ejército		1944–1946
Venezuela		Aviation Regiment N° 1 Regimiento de Aviación N° 1		1936–1944
Venezuela		Venezuelan Military Aviation School; Escuela de Aviación Militar		1920–1936
Venezuela		Venezuelan Army Aviation; Servicio Aéreo del Ejército Venezolano		1970
Venezuela		Venezuelan Naval Aviation; Aviación de la Marina Venezolana		1985
Venezuela		Servicio de Aviacion Naval Venezolana		1974-1985
Venezuela		Naval Aviation Centre		1922
Venezuela		National Guard of Venezuela; Comando de Apoyo Aéreo de Guardia Nacional		1999
Vietnam		Vietnam People's Air Force; Không quân Nhân dân Việt Nam		1975
Vietnam		Vietnam Democratic Republic Air Force		1965–1975
Vietnam		Vietnam Democratic Republic Air Force		1955–1965
Vietnam		Republic of Vietnam Air Force; Không lực Việt Nam Cộng hòa Republic of Vietnam Military Forces		1955–1975
Vietnam		Naval Air Force, Vietnam People's Navy		1986
Vietnam		Vietnam Coast Guard, Aviation		2008–2013

== Y ==
Country	Current	Service Indigenous name	Former	Established
Yemen		Yemeni Air Force القوات الجوية اليمنية والدفاع الجوي; Al Quwwat al Jawwiya al Yemeniya		1990
Yemen		Arab Republic of Yemen Air Force (North Yemen)		1962-1990
Yemen		People's Democratic Republic of Yemen Air Force (South Yemen)		1969-1990
Yemen		Federation of South Arabia Air Force (South Yemen)		1967-1969

== Z ==
Country	Current	Service Indigenous name	Former	Established
Zambia (formerly Northern Rhodesia)		Zambian Air Force		1968
Zambia (formerly Northern Rhodesia)		Zambia Air Wing		1964–1968
Zambia (formerly Northern Rhodesia)		Federation of Rhodesia & Nyasaland Air Force		1954–1963
Zimbabwe (formerly Southern Rhodesia)		Air Force of Zimbabwe		1980
Zimbabwe (formerly Southern Rhodesia)		former insignia		1982–1994
Zimbabwe (formerly Southern Rhodesia)		Zimbabwe-Rhodesian Air Force		1979–1980
Zimbabwe (formerly Southern Rhodesia)		Rhodesian Air Force; Rhodesian Security Forces		1970–1979
Zimbabwe (formerly Southern Rhodesia)		Royal Rhodesian Air Force		1963–1970
Zimbabwe (formerly Southern Rhodesia)		Federation of Rhodesia & Nyasaland Air Force		1954–1963
Zimbabwe (formerly Southern Rhodesia)		Southern Rhodesian Air Force		1947–1954
Zimbabwe (formerly Southern Rhodesia)		Rhodesian Regiment Air Unit		1935–1939

== Former countries and movements ==
Country	Current	Service Indigenous name	Former	Established
Abu Dhabi		Abu Dhabi Air Force		1968–1976
Austria-Hungary		Imperial and Royal Aviation Troops; Kaiserliche und Königliche Luftfahrtruppen		1912–1919
Austria-Hungary				1915–1918
Austria-Hungary				1914–1916
Austria-Hungary		Imperial and Royal Aviation Service; KuK. Militär-Aeronautische Anstalt		1893–1912
Austria-Hungary		Austro-Hungarian Naval Air Corps; K.u.K. Seefliegerkorps		1916–1918
Biafra		Biafran Air Force		1967–1970
Bophuthatswana		Bophuthatswana Air Force		1987–1994
Bophuthatswana		Bophuthatswana Defence Force Air Wing		1981-1987
Central African Empire		Central African Empire Air Force		1976–1979
Ceylon		Royal Ceylon Air Force රාජකීය ලංකා ගුවන් හමුදාව; Rajakeeya Lanka Guwan Hamudawa		1951–1972
Chechen Republic of Ichkeria		Chechen National Guard aviation		1990s
Reorganized National Government of the Republic of China (Wang Jingwei regime)		Nanjing Government air force		1941–1945
Ciskei		Ciskei Defence Force		1980–1994
Croatian Republic of Herzeg-Bosnia		Croatian Defence Council aviation		1992–
Czechoslovakia: Czech and Slovak Federal Republic; Czechoslovak Socialist Republic; Third Czechoslovak Republic; Czechoslovak government-in-exile; Second Czechoslovak Republic; First Czechoslovak Republic		Czech and Slovakian Air Force		1990–1993
Czechoslovakia: Czech and Slovak Federal Republic; Czechoslovak Socialist Republic; Third Czechoslovak Republic; Czechoslovak government-in-exile; Second Czechoslovak Republic; First Czechoslovak Republic		Czechoslovak Air Force; Czechoslovak People's Army		1945–1990
Czechoslovakia: Czech and Slovak Federal Republic; Czechoslovak Socialist Republic; Third Czechoslovak Republic; Czechoslovak government-in-exile; Second Czechoslovak Republic; First Czechoslovak Republic		Slovak Insurgent Air Force		August–October 1944
Czechoslovakia: Czech and Slovak Federal Republic; Czechoslovak Socialist Republic; Third Czechoslovak Republic; Czechoslovak government-in-exile; Second Czechoslovak Republic; First Czechoslovak Republic		1st Czechoslovak Mixed Air Division; 1st Czechoslovak Army Corps in the Soviet Union		1944-1945
Czechoslovakia: Czech and Slovak Federal Republic; Czechoslovak Socialist Republic; Third Czechoslovak Republic; Czechoslovak government-in-exile; Second Czechoslovak Republic; First Czechoslovak Republic		Czechoslovak Air Force in the West		1940-1946
Czechoslovakia: Czech and Slovak Federal Republic; Czechoslovak Socialist Republic; Third Czechoslovak Republic; Czechoslovak government-in-exile; Second Czechoslovak Republic; First Czechoslovak Republic		Czechoslovak Army Air Force		1918–1939
Czechoslovakia: Czech and Slovak Federal Republic; Czechoslovak Socialist Republic; Third Czechoslovak Republic; Czechoslovak government-in-exile; Second Czechoslovak Republic; First Czechoslovak Republic		Gendarmerie (Czechoslovakia), Air Wing		1935-1939
(Slovakia) Slovak Republic		Slovak Air Force		1939–1945
Dahomey		Dahomey Air Force; Force Aérienne de Dahomey		1961–1975
Dubai		Dubai Police Air Wing		1971-1976
Free City of Danzig		Free City of Danzig Police Air Squadron		1919-
Free France		Free French Air Force		1940–1945
Free France		Free French Naval Air Service		1940–1945
East Germany		Air Forces of the National People's Army; Luftstreitkräfte und Luftverteidigung der Deutschen Demokratischen Republik; National People's Army		1956-1990
East Germany		People's Navy		-1990
East Germany		Land Forces of the National People's Army		-1990
East Germany		Border Troops of the German Democratic Republic		-1990
East Germany		Gesellschaft für Sport und Technik aviation Paramilitary sports and pre-military training organization.		-1990
Second East Turkestan Republic		Ili National Army aviation		1945-1949
Haganah		Sherut Avir; Air Service		1947-1948
Haganah		Palavir; Air Companies		1943-1947
(Republic of Ireland) Irish Free state		Irish National Army		1922–1924
Kingdom of Nejd and Hejaz; Kingdom of Hejaz		Hejaz Air Force القوات الجوية الحجازية		1921–1932
Imperial State of Iran		Imperial Iranian Air Force		1925–1979
Italian Social Republic; Kingdom of Italy		Aeronautica Nazionale Repubblicana		1943–1945
Italian Social Republic; Kingdom of Italy		Regia Aeronautica		1923–1943
People's Republic of Kampuchea; Democratic Kampuchea; Kingdom of Cambodia; Khmer Republic		Cambodian People's Air Force		1989–1993
People's Republic of Kampuchea; Democratic Kampuchea; Kingdom of Cambodia; Khmer Republic		Kampuchean People's Air Force		1979–1989
People's Republic of Kampuchea; Democratic Kampuchea; Kingdom of Cambodia; Khmer Republic		Kampuchean Revolutionary Armed Forces Air Force		1977–1979
People's Republic of Kampuchea; Democratic Kampuchea; Kingdom of Cambodia; Khmer Republic		Khmer Air Force		1970–1975
Makhnovshchina		Air Fleet of the Revolutionary Insurgent Army of Ukraine		1918-1921
(Madagascar) Malagasy Republic		Malagasy Air Force		1961
Federated Malay States / Unfederated Malay States / Malayan Union / Malaya		Royal Malayan Air Force		1958–1963
Federated Malay States / Unfederated Malay States / Malayan Union / Malaya		Malayan Auxiliary Air Force		1950–1958
Federated Malay States / Unfederated Malay States / Malayan Union / Malaya		Malayan Volunteer Air Force		1940-1950
Straits Settlements		Straits Settlements Volunteer Air Force		1936-1941
Manchukuo		Manchukuo Air Force		1937–1945
Manchukuo		Manchukuo Air Transport Company		1931-1937
Mukti Bahini		Operation Kilo Flight		1971-1972
Muscat and Oman		Sultan of Oman's Air Force		1959–1990
Germany		Luftwaffe; Wehrmacht		1933–1945
Nazi Party		National Socialist Flyers Corps; Paramilitary aviation organization of the Nazi Party.		1937-1945
Nazi Party		German Air Sports Association		1933-1937
(Netherlands) Dutch East Indies		Royal Netherlands East Indies Army Air Force		1939-1950
(Netherlands) Dutch East Indies		Free Dutch East Indies Air Force		1942–1945
Mutawakkilite Kingdom of Yemen/ North Yemen/ South Yemen		Yemen Arab Republic Air Force		1962–1990
Mutawakkilite Kingdom of Yemen/ North Yemen/ South Yemen		Mutawakkilite Kingdom of Yemen Air Force		-1962
Mutawakkilite Kingdom of Yemen/ North Yemen/ South Yemen		People's Republic of South Yemen Air Force		1969–1980
Mutawakkilite Kingdom of Yemen/ North Yemen/ South Yemen		People's Democratic Republic of Yemen Air Force		1980-1990
North Vietnam		North Vietnam Air Force		1955–1975
Ottoman Empire		Ottoman Air Force; Kuva-yı Havaiye Müfettişliği		1909–1920
Ottoman Empire		Ottoman Naval Aviation Academy and Service; Bahriye Tayyare Mektebi ve Havacılık Şubesi		1914–1919
(Laos) Pathet Lao		Pathet Lao aviation		1960–1975
Permesta		Revolutionary Air Force of Indonesia		1958
Southern Rhodesia; Rhodesia and Nyasaland; Rhodesia; Zimbabwe Rhodesia		Rhodesian Air Force; Rhodesian Security Forces		1970–1979
Southern Rhodesia; Rhodesia and Nyasaland; Rhodesia; Zimbabwe Rhodesia		Royal Rhodesian Air Force		1963–1970
Southern Rhodesia; Rhodesia and Nyasaland; Rhodesia; Zimbabwe Rhodesia		Federation of Rhodesia and Nyasaland Air Force		1954–1963
Southern Rhodesia; Rhodesia and Nyasaland; Rhodesia; Zimbabwe Rhodesia		Southern Rhodesian Air Force		1939–1954
Southern Rhodesia; Rhodesia and Nyasaland; Rhodesia; Zimbabwe Rhodesia		Rhodesian Regiment Air Unit		1935–1939
(Senegal) (The Gambia) Senegambia Confederation		Senegambia Air Force; Armée de l'Air du Sénégambia		1982–1989
Republika Srpska		Republika Srpska Air Force; Army of Republika Srpska		1992–2006
Republic of Serbian Krajina		105th Aviation Brigade; Army of the Republic of Serb Krajina		1991–1995
(Thailand) (Thailand) Rattanakosin Kingdom of Siam		Royal Siamese Air Division		1921–1935
(Thailand) (Thailand) Rattanakosin Kingdom of Siam		Siamese Army Aviation Division		1917–1921
(Thailand) (Thailand) Rattanakosin Kingdom of Siam		Siamese Army Aviation Unit	Thailand 1855	1914–1917
(South Africa) South West Africa		South West Africa Territorial Force, Air Wing		1980–1989
State of Vietnam / South Vietnam		Republic of Vietnam Air Force; Không lực Việt Nam Cộng hoà Republic of Vietnam Military Forces		1955–1975
State of Vietnam / South Vietnam		Vietnam National Army, Air Force		1951–1955
Federation of South Arabia / South Yemen		Air Force of the People's Democratic Republic of Yemen		1967-1990
Federation of South Arabia / South Yemen		Federation of South Arabia Air Force		1967
Swaziland	Eswatini	Umbutfo Swaziland Defence Force Air Wing		1979-2018
(Russia) Russian Empire (Russia) Russian Provisional Government (Russia) Russian Republic; Russian SFSR; Soviet Union		Soviet Air Forces; Soviet Armed Forces; Военно-воздушные силы		1930–1991
(Russia) Russian Empire (Russia) Russian Provisional Government (Russia) Russian Republic; Russian SFSR; Soviet Union				1943–1992
(Russia) Russian Empire (Russia) Russian Provisional Government (Russia) Russian Republic; Russian SFSR; Soviet Union		Soviet Volunteer Group		1937–1941
(Russia) Russian Empire (Russia) Russian Provisional Government (Russia) Russian Republic; Russian SFSR; Soviet Union		Imperial Russian Air Service		1910–1917
(Russia) Russian Empire (Russia) Russian Provisional Government (Russia) Russian Republic; Russian SFSR; Soviet Union		Soviet Air Defence Forces, Soviet Armed Forces		1948–1991
(Russia) Russian Empire (Russia) Russian Provisional Government (Russia) Russian Republic; Russian SFSR; Soviet Union		Soviet Naval Aviation		1918–1991
(Russia) Russian Empire (Russia) Russian Provisional Government (Russia) Russian Republic; Russian SFSR; Soviet Union		Sovet Border Troops Aviation		-1992
Russian State (1918-1920); South Russia (1919-1920)		White Army Air Unites		
Tamil Eelam		Air Tigers; Liberation Tigers of Tamil Eelam		1998–2009
Transkei		Transkei Defence Force, Air Wing		1986–1994
United Arab Republic		United Arab Republic Air Force		1958–1961
United Arab Republic		Egyptian Air Force		1952–1958
United Arab Republic		Syrian Air Force		1948–1958
Upper Volta		Upper Volta Air Force; Force Aérienne de Haute-Volta		1964–1984
Venda		Venda Defence Force		1983–1994
Vichy France		Vichy French Air Force		1940–1942
West Germany		German Air Force; Luftwaffe		1955
West Germany		German Naval Aviation; Marineflieger		1957
West Germany		German Army Aviation Corps; Heeresfliegertruppe		1957
West Germany		Federal Border Guards; Bundesgrenzschutz		-2005
(Ukraine) West Ukrainian People's Republic		Ukrainian Galician Army Aviation		1918-1919
Ukrainian People's Republic		Ukrainian People's Republic Air Fleet		1917-1921
Kingdom of Serbia / State of Slovenes, Croats and Serbs / Kingdom of Yugoslavia / Yugoslav government-in-exile / Democratic Federal Yugoslavia / SFR Yugoslavia / FR Yugoslavia / Serbia and Montenegro		Air Force of Serbia and Montenegro; Ратно ваздухопловство и противваздушна одбрана Војске Србије и Црне Горе; Ratno vazduhoplovstvo i protivvazdushna odbrana Vojske Srbije i Crne Gore, Armed Forces of Serbia and Montenegro		2003–2006
Kingdom of Serbia / State of Slovenes, Croats and Serbs / Kingdom of Yugoslavia / Yugoslav government-in-exile / Democratic Federal Yugoslavia / SFR Yugoslavia / FR Yugoslavia / Serbia and Montenegro		FR Yugoslavia Air Force; Ратно ваздухопловство и противваздушна одбрана Војске Југославије; Ratno vazduhoplovstvo i protivvazdušna odbrana Vojske Jugoslavije		1992–2003
Kingdom of Serbia / State of Slovenes, Croats and Serbs / Kingdom of Yugoslavia / Yugoslav government-in-exile / Democratic Federal Yugoslavia / SFR Yugoslavia / FR Yugoslavia / Serbia and Montenegro		SFR Yugoslav Air Force; Југословенско Ратно Ваздухопловство и Противваздушна Одбрана; Jugoslovensko Ratno Vazduhoplovstvo i Protivvazdušna Odbrana; Yugoslav People's Army		1945–1991
Kingdom of Serbia / State of Slovenes, Croats and Serbs / Kingdom of Yugoslavia / Yugoslav government-in-exile / Democratic Federal Yugoslavia / SFR Yugoslavia / FR Yugoslavia / Serbia and Montenegro		Yugoslav Air Force Outside the Homeland		1941–1945
Kingdom of Serbia / State of Slovenes, Croats and Serbs / Kingdom of Yugoslavia / Yugoslav government-in-exile / Democratic Federal Yugoslavia / SFR Yugoslavia / FR Yugoslavia / Serbia and Montenegro		Yugoslav Partisans Air Force		1941-1945
Kingdom of Serbia / State of Slovenes, Croats and Serbs / Kingdom of Yugoslavia / Yugoslav government-in-exile / Democratic Federal Yugoslavia / SFR Yugoslavia / FR Yugoslavia / Serbia and Montenegro		Royal Yugoslav Air Force; Ваздухопловство војске Краљевине Југославије; Vazduhoplovstvo vojske Kraljevine Jugoslavije		1929–1941
Kingdom of Serbia / State of Slovenes, Croats and Serbs / Kingdom of Yugoslavia / Yugoslav government-in-exile / Democratic Federal Yugoslavia / SFR Yugoslavia / FR Yugoslavia / Serbia and Montenegro		Royal Yugoslav Army Aviation Department; Авиацијско Одељење Југословенске Краљевске Армије; Aviacijsko Odeljenje Jugoslovenske Kraljevske Armije		1918–1929
Kingdom of Serbia / State of Slovenes, Croats and Serbs / Kingdom of Yugoslavia / Yugoslav government-in-exile / Democratic Federal Yugoslavia / SFR Yugoslavia / FR Yugoslavia / Serbia and Montenegro		Serbian Military Air Service		1912–1918
Kingdom of Serbia / State of Slovenes, Croats and Serbs / Kingdom of Yugoslavia / Yugoslav government-in-exile / Democratic Federal Yugoslavia / SFR Yugoslavia / FR Yugoslavia / Serbia and Montenegro		Royal Yugoslav Navy, Naval Air Service		-1941
Independent State of Croatia		Air Force of the Independent State of Croatia		1941–1945
Independent State of Croatia		Croatian Air Force Legion		1941–1945
Zaire (Democratic Republic of the Congo) (Democratic Republic of the Congo) (Democratic Republic of the Congo) Republic of the Congo (Léopoldville); Belgian Congo		Zaire Air Force; Force Aerienne Zairoies		1971–1997
Zaire (Democratic Republic of the Congo) (Democratic Republic of the Congo) (Democratic Republic of the Congo) Republic of the Congo (Léopoldville); Belgian Congo		Congolese Air Force; Force Aeriennes Congolaises		1960–1971
Zaire (Democratic Republic of the Congo) (Democratic Republic of the Congo) (Democratic Republic of the Congo) Republic of the Congo (Léopoldville); Belgian Congo		former insignia		1960–1964
Zaire (Democratic Republic of the Congo) (Democratic Republic of the Congo) (Democratic Republic of the Congo) Republic of the Congo (Léopoldville); Belgian Congo		Force Publique Air Arm		1944–1960
Katanga		Katangese Air Force; Force Aerienne Katangaise		1960–1963

== Other ==
Country	Current	Service Indigenous name	Former	Established
Abkhazia		Abkhazian Air Force		2008
Abkhazia		former insignia		1992–
Republic of Artsakh		Artsakh Defense Army aviation		1990s-2023
British Hong Kong		Royal Hong Kong Auxiliary Air Force		1951-1993
British Hong Kong		Hong Kong Auxiliary Air Force; Royal Air Force		1949-1951
British Hong Kong		Hong Kong Volunteer Defence Corps – Air Arm; Royal Air Force		1930-1949
South Ossetia		South Ossetian Air Corps		1990s
Sovereign Military Order of Malta		Military Corps of the Sovereign Military Order of Malta		1947-1950
Transnistria		Transnistrian Air Force		1991
Turkish Republic of Northern Cyprus		Aviation Unit Command		1976

== See also ==
- Lists of military aircraft by nation
- List of militaries by country
- List of armies by country
- List of navies
- List of space forces
- List of gendarmeries
