= School of Army Aviation =

School of Army Aviation may refer to:

- School of Army Aviation (Germany)
- School of Army Aviation (Turkey)
