= Force 17 =

Defunct Palestinian security organization

- Active: Early 1970s – 2007
- Country: Palestine
- Type: Commando and special operations unit
- Part of: Palestinian Fatah movement and later of the Office of the Chairman of the Palestinian Authority
- Garrison/HQ: Al-Fakhani Street in Beirut
- Engagements: Uganda–Tanzania War

Commanders
- Notable commanders: Ali Hassan Salameh (Founder)

Force 17 (Arabic: القوة 17) was a commando and special operations unit of the Palestinian Fatah movement and later of the Office of the Chairman of the Palestinian Authority. It was formed in the early 1970s by Ali Hassan Salameh (Abu Hassan). Initially, the group was housed in building 17 of Al-Fakhani Street in Beirut.

== History ==
Force 17 was formed by Ali Hassan Salameh in the 1970s in an attempt to professionalize Fatah's intelligence services. Force 17 was also initially responsible for Yasser Arafat's personal security. Salameh was wrongly believed to have masterminded the 1972 Munich massacre and was assassinated in January 1979 as part of Mossad assassinations following the Munich massacre.

=== Dissolution ===
In 1994, the unit was largely absorbed into Yasser Arafat’s personal security force, the Palestinian Authority's "Presidential Security". In 2006, the unit was separated, to become the Presidential Guard as part of the Palestinian Security Services. During the Lebanese Civil War, then-14-year-old Imad Mughniyeh joined Force 17 in 1976. He worked as a sniper in Beirut, targeting Christian fighters on the Green Line.

In 2007, a plan to dismantle the remnant of Force 17 and incorporate it into the Presidential Guard of President Mahmoud Abbas was unveiled by Ynet. The Force was merged into the Presidential Guard and the National Security Forces in December 2007.

== Operations ==
- 1979: Force 17 elements were dispatched to Uganda to assist the PLO's efforts to defend the regime of Idi Amin during the Uganda–Tanzania War.
- September 1985: Gunmen allegedly part of Force 17 stormed a yacht moored in Larnaca, Cyprus killing three Israeli citizens. PLO authorities at the time denied involvement.
- December 1985: Force 17 claimed responsibility for the kidnapping and murder of IDF soldier Moshe Levi. His body was found burning near Mazor.

=== Rumored operations ===
- The group has been accused by some of having carried out the 1987 assassination of Palestinian cartoonist Naji al-Ali in London.

=== Operations against Force 17 ===
- On January 28, 2001, the IDF captured six members of Force 17, who were believed responsible for the shooting deaths of at least seven Israelis in the Ramallah area, including Binyamin Ze'ev Kahane and his wife Talya Kahane. Binyamin Kahane was the son of Kach leader, Rabbi Meir Kahane.
- February 2001, an Israeli helicopter fired a missile killing prominent Force 17 member Massoud Ayyad.

== Leadership ==
According to most reports Force 17 was founded in the early 1970s by Ali Hassan Salameh. In 1979 Salameh and his bodyguards were assassinated in Beirut by Israeli intelligence.

Mahmoud Awad Damra reportedly commanded Force 17. In 2006, he was sentenced by an Israeli court to 15 years in prison for his role in planning several attacks against Israel. He was released as part of the Gilad Shalit prisoner exchange.

== See also ==
- Force 14
