= Free Dutch forces =

WWII military of the Dutch government-in-exile

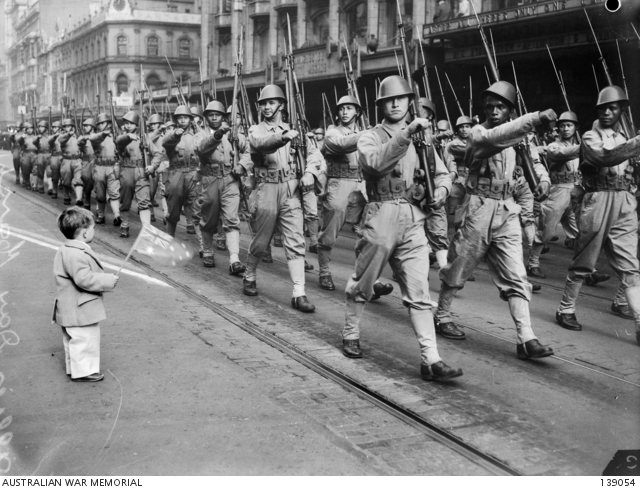
Royal Netherlands East Indies Army (KNIL) troops marching through Melbourne, Australia on 14 June 1943.

The Free Dutch Forces were the Dutch military formations of the Dutch government-in-exile and its colonies that were formed to fight alongside the Western Allies against Nazi Germany and its allies during World War II following the Dutch surrender in May 1940.

After the Battle of France, Dutch infantry that had escaped to Britain organized themselves into a "Dutch Legion", which after more structural changes became the Princess Irene Brigade and fought alongside the Allies until the end of the war. In the West Indies, the local defense force protected some of the largest oil refineries in the world, while the Royal Netherlands East Indies Army (KNIL) played a major part in the Pacific War from 1941 to 1942. The Royal Netherlands Navy, the strongest branch of the Dutch Armed Forces, served all over the world.

== In Europe ==
=== German invasion ===
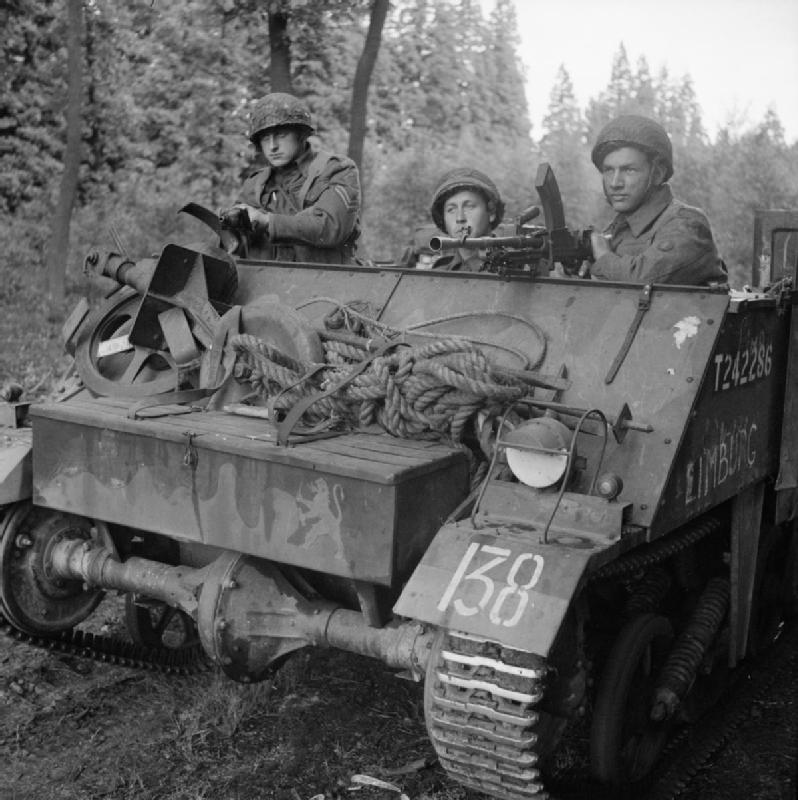
A Loyd Carrier of the Princess Irene Brigade, in September 1944.

The Dutch were unprepared for the full force of German invasion and by 14 May 1940 all of the Netherlands save for the south western province of Zeeland had been overrun. The Dutch government fled to London, taking with them the national bullion and diamond stocks. The Dutch government-in-exile established itself under Queen Wilhelmina of the Netherlands and remained in London until the end of the war.

=== In exile ===
Free Dutch Forces in Europe primarily consisted of the Princess Irene Brigade, British commando units and those undertaking escort duty. Most of the Dutch soldiers that escaped did so from Belgian and French ports at Brest and Cherbourg. By June 1940, 1,460 officers and soldiers had arrived in Great Britain. This Detachment Royal Netherlands' Troops in Great Britain (sometimes The Dutch Legion) was initially assigned to guard duties, being shuffled between several British Army bases until the Dutch government decided to establish a Dutch unit. On 27 May 1940, the call for troops was issued. A number of Dutch personnel volunteered for American and Canadian armies with some being posted to the Dutch East Indies. Others like the Royal Marechaussee (military and civil police) were assigned to police and guard duties in London or as gunners in the merchant marine. Volunteers from 26 countries answered the call, although mostly older age men; about 80 men served in British Commando units. Many of these men served in the No. 2 (Dutch) Troop of the No. 10 Inter-Allied Commando. Other Dutch personnel served in the Royal Air Force as members of 320 (Netherlands) Squadron and 321 (Dutch) Squadron.

On 11 January 1941, the Dutch government formally established the "Royal Dutch Brigade". This formation was renamed the "Princess Irene Brigade" on 26 August 1941 after the 2nd granddaughter of Queen Wilhelmina. In the 21st Army Group (General Bernard Montgomery), the brigade fought from Normandy to Holland, participating in a liberation parade in Amsterdam. The conscription of emigrants and their offspring was put introduced to expand the Dutch Armed Forces with men from the United States, Canada, South Africa, South America, the United Kingdom and other countries entering service. Many of these conscripts had never been to the Netherlands nor spoke or read any Dutch. On establishment the brigade consisted of a headquarters staff, a communications unit, two battalions, a depot supply train, a medical support post, a repair unit and military police. The depot supply train would later form a third battalion. The brigade undertook training firstly in Guelph, then Stratford, Ontario alongside British units.

The Princess Irene Brigade consisted of a headquarters, three companies, reconnaissance unit, artillery battery, and train. Attempts to form a complete brigade, including a full complement of artillery and a tank unit were not successful. The unit never totaled more than about 2,000 men at one time with a total of around 3,000 serving, less than the 3,000 to 4,000 personnel normally associated with a brigade.

=== Normandy landings ===
Following the landings at Normandy the Princess Irene Brigade, under Colonel A. C. de Ruyter van Steveninck, landed 8 August 1944. The brigade first saw combat under the British 6th Airborne Division at the River Orne near Breville, of the Orne bridgehead, called the "Hell-Fire Corner" by the Canadians, taking a single casualty.

Following on the heels of the retreating Germans, the brigade advanced losing 15 men in the process by mid-September. On 11 September 1944, in eastern Belgium around Campine, the brigade came into contact with German SS, paratroopers, and fellow enemy countrymen of the Dutch SS Landstorm.

=== Operation Market Garden ===
On 20 September 1944 at midnight they crossed the Dutch border near Valkenswaard, located south of Eindhoven as a part of Operation Market Garden. The brigade took positions along the river Meuse (Dutch: Maas) near the then unnamed John S. Thompsonbrug bridge. The unit also participated in the liberation of Tilburg in 1944.

=== End of the war ===
On 25 April 1945, the brigade attempted to cross near Hedel in an attempt to force the surrender of the German garrison cut off in northern Holland. Following the German surrender the Brigade marched victoriously into The Hague.

A monument to 12 members of the Princess Irene Brigade killed between 23 and 26 April 1945 was erected in Hedel, Netherlands. The brigade's traditions would be carried on by the Garderegiment Fuseliers Prinses Irene regiment.

== In the West Indies ==
The Dutch presence in the Caribbean and South America was minimal. The Netherlands West Indies included the possessions of Aruba, Bonaire, Curaçao, Saba, and Sint Eustatius and Sint Maarten. Just to the south lay Surinam. At the Netherlands' entrance into the war in 1940, the West Indies was only defended by local police and militia. The only Dutch naval vessel stationed there was the sloop Van Kinsbergen. Surinam was protected by a single 200-strong company of Army infantry, supplemented by a militia rifle company and an old station ship.

Aruba and Curaçao were home to important oil refineries, therefore the two islands were placed under British protection on 10 May 1940. Surinam was one of the most important bauxite suppliers. Aluminium was vital to the American airplane industry. In September 1941, President Franklin D. Roosevelt offered American troops to help protect the colony. In November 1941, the first 1,000 American troops arrived in Paramaribo. In 1942, protection of Aruba and Curaçao was transferred to the United States.

In 1942 funding was made available in Surinam for coastal artillery and conscription. Conscripted soldiers in Surinam and the West Indies formed national guard units, called Schutterij. Hundreds of conscripts served as anti-aircraft gunners on merchant and navy vessels during the war, of whom dozens were killed. Volunteers joined the Civic Guard (Burgerwacht) in the West Indies and the City and Country Guard (Stad en Landwacht) in Surinam. By then a Dutch motor whaleboat patrolled Aruba while Curaçao was defended by several light craft. The latter were detached for use as convoy escorts in July 1942.

== In the East Indies ==
=== Rise of the Japanese ===
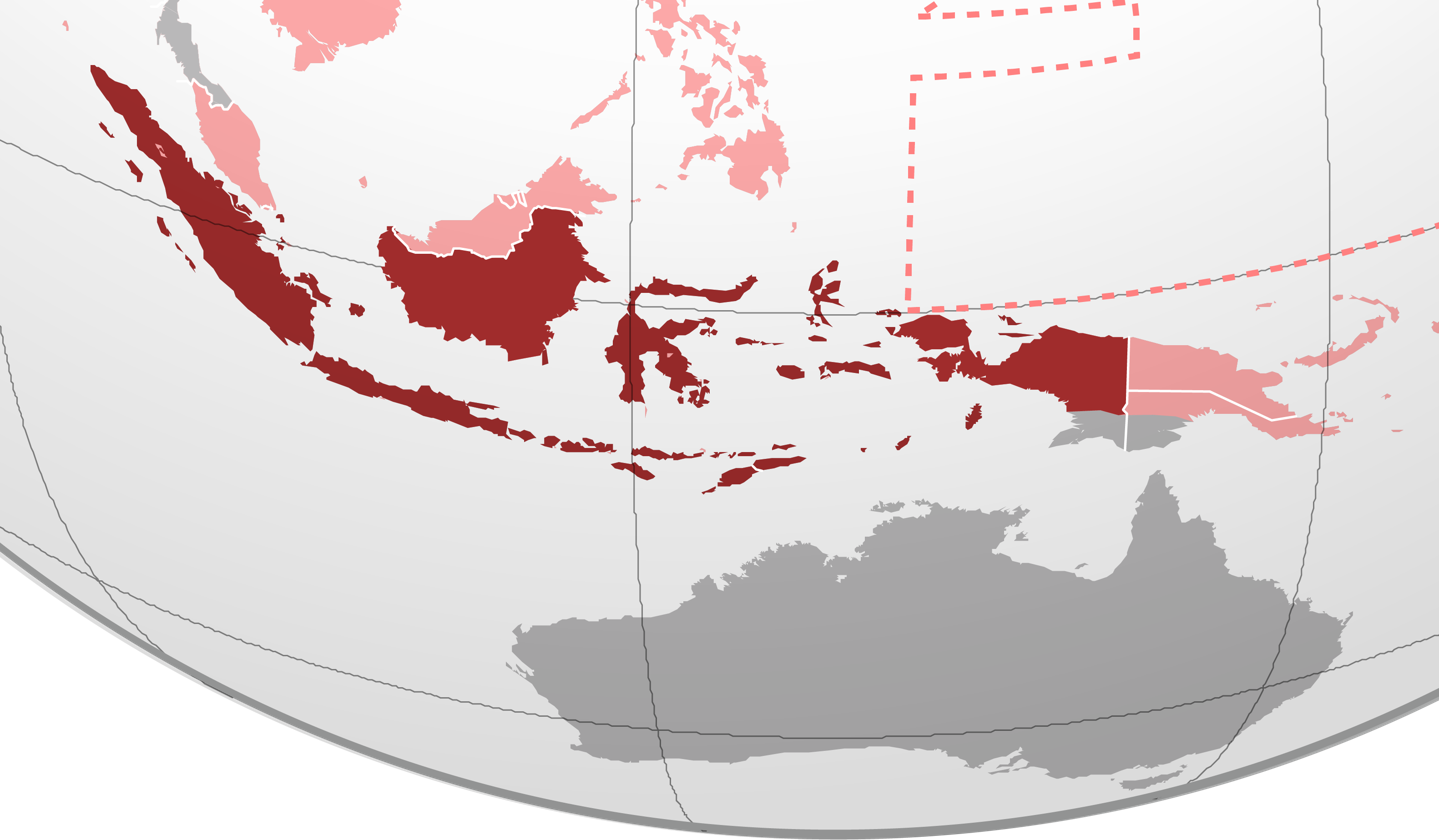
The Dutch East Indies (dark red) within the Empire of Japan (light red) at its furthest extent.

Soon after Japan joined the Axis powers it began to expand its territory south. The Free Dutch Forces in the Dutch East Indies started preparing for the Japanese attack with the Allies. On 8 December 1941 at 7:00 a.m. the Dutch Government declared war on Japan. The American-British-Dutch-Australian Command (ABDACOM) was formed; however, with the loss at the Battle of the Java Sea, the Japanese attack on the Dutch East Indies and subsequent collapse of resistance, the ABDACOM dissolved only weeks later. Defending against invasion were 93,000 Dutch troops and 5,000 American, Australian and British soldiers. After four months' fighting the Japanese occupied most of the Dutch East Indies with only the southwestern part of the island of New Guinea, including the Dutch garrison at Merauke, not under their control. A small garrison of Dutch troops, consisting of an infantry company, remained at Merauke and was later reinforced by Australian and US personnel from Merauke Force. Meanwhile, in the wake of the loss of the Dutch East Indies, large numbers of Free Dutch personnel escaped to Australia where they were reorganised; four joint Dutch-Australian squadrons – Nos. 18, 19, 119 and 120 Squadrons – were formed within the Royal Australian Air Force during this time. Several Dutch naval vessels, including the light cruiser HNLMS Tromp, and several submarines, also escaped to Australia and operated throughout the war.

=== Return of the Dutch ===
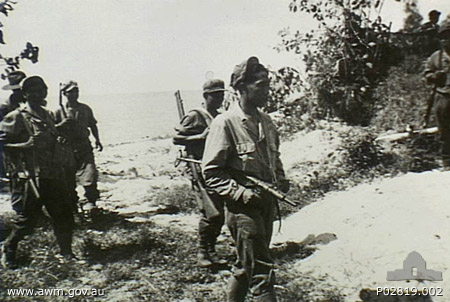
Australian and KNIL soldiers patrolling during the 1945 Battle of Tarakan

In early 1942, the Japanese launched a campaign in New Guinea, advancing south towards Port Moresby in the Territory of Papua. Throughout 1942 and 1943, the Allies fought several campaigns to stop the Japanese advance in the Pacific, with significant actions being fought in Papua, New Guinea and the Solomons by largely US and Australian forces. In April 1944, the Allies launched a campaign to recapture the western part of New Guinea as part of their advance towards the Philippines. After the victory in the Battle of Noemfoor, which included a 40-man Netherlands East Indies Civil Administration (NICA) detachment, the Allies recaptured more of western New Guinea. Later, in September, the Allies, including a NICA detachment, recaptured the Morotai region.

On 5 October 1944, based on FRUMEL intelligence, the Free Dutch Forces submarine Zwaardvisch was ordered to intercept the German U-boat U-168. At periscope depth on the morning of 6 October, the Zwaardvisch under the command of Lieutenant Commander H Goosens spotted the U-168 off the northern coast of Java. Well positioned, Goosens ordered a six torpedo spread sinking the German U-boat with the loss of 23 men. The Zwaardvisch returned safely to Fremantle 20 days later after having sunk four more enemy ships. On 1 May 1945, the Allies launched their last campaign against Japanese in Borneo, commencing with the Battle of Tarakan. The majority of combat troops were Australian, although the Free Dutch Forces provided a company of Ambonese infantry commanded by Dutch officers and a civil affairs unit.

The Dutch Army also participated in the Balikpapan in July 1945, where a small number of Dutch KNIL troops were assigned to the operation alongside Australian and US personnel; the Dutch contribution amounted to a company from the 1st NEI Battalion. Major operations in Borneo ended in late July, although minor clashes in Borneo continued until the Japanese surrendered in August 1945.

== See also ==
- Battle of the Netherlands
- Dutch government-in-exile
- Dutch East Indies campaign
- Japanese occupation of the Dutch East Indies
