= People's Republic of Congo Air Force =

- Founded: 1970
- Country: People's Republic of the Congo
- Branch: Air force
- Role: Aerial warfare
- Part of: Congolese Armed Forces

Insignia
- Former roundel

Aircraft flown
- Fighter: Mig-21
- Helicopter: Mil Mi-35, Mil Mi-17
- Transport: An-26

The People's Republic of Congo Air Force was the air force of the Republic of the Congo from 1970-1992.

== Aircraft ==
=== Inventory from 1960-1992 ===
Aircraft	Origin	Type	Variant	In service	Notes
Combat Aircraft
MiG-21	Soviet Union	fighter / interceptor		14	placed in storage
MiG-17	Soviet Union	fighter	MiG-17F	8	placed in storage
Transport
C-47 Dakota	United States	transport		2	
SN.601 Corvette	France	VIP		1	
N.2501F Noratlas	France	transport		2	
Ilyushin Il-14	Soviet Union	transport		2	
An-24	Soviet Union	transport		7	
An-26	Soviet Union	transport		1	
Helicopters
Alouette II	France	liaison		2	
Alouette III	France	liaison		2	
AS365 Dauphin	France	VIP	SA365C	1	
Mi-8	Soviet Union	transport		1	
Trainer Aircraft
MiG-15	Soviet Union	jet trainer	MiG-15UTi	1	placed in storage
