= History of the Sri Lanka Air Force =

== Early days ==
In its early years, the air force was engaged primarily in immigration patrol, with occasional assistance in emergency relief. During the insurgency of 1971, the air force played a major role in restoring internal order; in addition to providing transport of ammunition, food, and troops, it participated in assaults against insurgent strongholds. Following the ethnic rioting of 1983, the air force was placed on permanent active status and participated in counter insurgency activities and airstrikes on the rebel controlled areas of the Northern and Eastern Provinces.

Because of a severe shortage of hard currency for military expenditures in the wake of the 1971 uprising, the Number Four Squadron(Helicopter) began operating commercial transportation services for foreign tourists under the name of Helitours. In 1987 the air force had a total strength of 3,700 personnel, including active reserves. The force had grown gradually during its early years, reaching a little over 1,000 officers and recruits in the 1960s. Rapid growth began in the mid-1980s, when the Sri Lankan Civil War drew the service into a major, long-term security role. Between 1983 and 1987, the force grew by nearly 50 percent.

As in the other services, a shortage of spare parts plagued maintenance efforts, forcing the service to send a number of aircraft to Singapore and elsewhere for repairs. After the purchase of equipment from Canada in 1986, the air force gained the capability to make structural repairs on its fleet of Bell helicopters, several of which had been damaged in operations against the Tamil separatists. Maintenance of electronic equipment was performed at the communications station at Ekala, in the north of Colombo District.

The earliest aircraft were small transport airplanes and trainers, that were provided by the British and were supplemented in the late 1960s with United States Bell Helicopters.

In 1959 for the first time fighter jets were acquired, forming the No. 5 Jet Squadron; these were five BAC Jet Provost from the British. These were used in combat, when for the first time Sri Lanka Air Force went into combat during 1971 Insurrection. During insurgency, the left-leaning Bandaranaike government turned to the Soviet Union for more sophisticated weaponry, and received five MiG-17F fighter bombers, a MiG-15 UTI Midget trainer, and two Ka-26 helicopters. By the early 1980s, the Provosts and all of the Soviet aircraft had been taken out of active service and were relegated to long-term storage, leaving the air force without any bomber capability.

== 1980s and 1990s ==
Sri Lankan Air Force Ensign (2010–present)

Sri Lankan Air Force Ensign (1971–2010)

Royal Ceylon Air Force Ensign (1951–1971)

After the 1983 riots, the government worked rapidly to expand the inventory, relying largely on sources in Italy, Britain, and the United States. Because of tight budget constraints, the air force was compelled to refit a number of non combat aircraft for military uses in counter-terrorist operations against Tamil terrorists. From the period 1983 to 1985, the Air Force acquired 11 Bell 212 helicopters, 4 Bell 412 helicopters, 3 Siai Marchetti SF 260s, 2 Cessna 337s, 1 AVRO HS748 and 1 Beech King. By 1985, 9 more Bell 212s were added to the fleet, along with 4 Bell 412s. The 412s along with 3 Siai Marchetti SF 260 fixed-wing turbo prop aircraft advanced the attack capabilities of SLAF. Central in the government's security efforts were six SIAI Marchetti SF.260 turboprop which were used for rocket attacks and strafing. Additionally, the air force, with the help of Heli Orient of Singapore, equipped twelve Bell 212 and Bell 412 helicopters to serve as gunships and as transport vehicles for highly successful commando assault operations. The air force had a fleet of approximately eighty aircraft, of which sixty-four were reported to be operational in early 1988.

Government forces reportedly also used helicopters on bombing missions; frequently operating without conventional bombs, air force troops reportedly dropped hand grenades stuffed in wine glasses so that the lever would not be released until the glass shattered on the ground. A more effective bombing capability was provided by a small fleet of Chinese Harbin Y-12 turboprop transport aircraft. These were equipped with bomb racks that had been fitted to carry up to 1,000 kilograms of fragmentation and antipersonnel bombs. Transport, training, and surveying functions were carried out by a variety of Cessna and DeHavilland aircraft. In 1987 during the Vadamarachchi Operation the air force mustered 1 AVRO, 2 Y-12s and 1 Heron, all configured as improvised bombers. On 3 September 1987 a Women's Wing was formed and located in Colombo. The first CO was Air Cdre D.S.G. Vithana. The Women's Wing was set up to maintain and update all records pertaining to Lady Officers and Airwomen, prepare promotional schedules, annual assessments, issue identity cards, etc.

In order to increase the attack capability the air force in 1991 acquired several F-7 Skybolts, FT-7s and Shenyang J-5s from China. Later in 1993 the first of 3 Mi-17 helicopter transports were acquired along with four FMA IA 58 Pucarás for ground attack. These proved to be effective but three of the Pucara's were lost, two due to the SAMs launched by the LTTE. The sole remaining Pucara was retired in 1999 due to lack of spare parts. In 1995 Mi-24 gunships were acquired for close air support for the army and by 2001 Mi-35s were added to the fleet.

In 1996 Sri Lankan Air Force acquired six Kfir C.2s and a single TC.2 from Israel and further more nine aircraft had been added to the inventory by year 2005. This included four C.2s and four C.7s in 2001 . Currently the SLAF operates two TC.2s, two C.7s and eight C.2s. The SLAF is using these Kfirs to attack against Tamil separatist targets in rebel controlled areas of the island.

== 21st century ==
In 2000 new aircraft were acquired apart from the additions of Kfir C.7's & Mi-35s, these included six Mikoyan MiG-27 of ground attack, a MiG-23UB trainer and two C-130 Hercules for heavy transport. Six K-8 Karakorum trainers were soon added creating the No. 14 Squadron to train pilots for the newly expanded fleet of jets.

On 24 July 2001, Thirteen aircraft including two Kfir jet fighters, one MI-24 Helicopter gun ship and one MIG-27- jet fighter were destroyed in the predawn attack on the Katunayake air base, about 35 km. north of Colombo by the LTTE.Three military trainee planes and five civilian jets were also among the destroyed aircraft. TamilNet Much of these aircraft were replaced.

Sri Lanka's airport has remained on alert for a repeat of the 2001 attack, with severe restrictions on the number of people allowed into the terminal buildings. Huge walls were also built around the terminals and the control towers to prevent impact from car bomb attacks, while a large number of sentries were placed along the approach roads to the facility. All airports including the Katunayake International airport is guarded by members of the SLAF Regiment.

== See also ==
- Sri Lanka Air Force
- Commander of the Sri Lanka Air Force
