= Straits Settlements Volunteer Air Force =

Defunct volunteer force of the Royal Air Force

- Active: 1936–1941
- Country: Straits Settlements
- Branch: Volunteer Reserves
- Type: Reserve air force
- Part of: Malaya Command
- Garrison/HQ: Singapore

The Straits Settlements Volunteer Air Force (SSVAF) was a military reserve force in the Straits Settlements, while they were under British rule, assisting the Royal Air Force (RAF) as an auxiliary. The SSVAF was the first volunteer air force in a British colony.

== History ==
On 28 October 1935, the bill to establish SSVAF was introduced in the Legislative Council of the Straits Settlements. Air commodore Sidney William Smith, officer commanding of RAF Far East, was appointed to have direct control over SSVAF.

Volunteers had to be between 17 and 40 years old, physically fit, and in possession of a valid type "A" civil flying licence.

Announced by Smith on 2 November 1935, Kallang Airport was selected as the headquarters for the new volunteer force, and facilities such as an officers' mess, a sergeants' mess, hangars and workshops, will be constructed as soon as the bill was enacted into law. Six Hawker Audax planes were also flown in from England to be used as the training aircraft.

The bill was passed on 25 March 1936, and enrolment began on 20 April 1936, after shortlisting hundreds of applications. Upon filling up the enrolment forms and successfully passing the medical examination, approval had to be sought from Governor Shenton Thomas before joining the volunteer force.

In May 1936, squadron leader Charles Henry Flinn was appointed to the command of SSVAF. An additional Hawker Hart and two Avro Tutor planes were flown in, and together with three RAF instructors, flight training began for five appointed volunteers on 6 June 1936. The five volunteers also had prior flying experiences at the Royal Singapore Flying Club.

On 7 August 1936, an Avro Tutor and a Hawker Hart flew alongside bombers from the No. 100 Squadron RAF to perform an aerobatic display at Kuala Lumpur, marking the first cooperation between the volunteer force and RAF.

In 1941, SSVAF was renamed to the Malayan Volunteer Air Force.

== Accidents and incidents ==
- 24 June 1936 – An Avro Tutor collided with a Vickers Vildebeeste while taxiing on the ground. Severe damage was inflicted to the Avro's wing and other equipment. No injuries were reported.
- 7 March 1938 – A Hawker Hart crashed while performing aerobatics at the Penang Flying Club pageant. The pilot suffered a dislocation to his arm, and bruises to his body.

== See also ==
- Battle of Malaya
- Battle of Singapore
- SAF Volunteer Corps (SAFVC)
