= Force 14 =

- Active: Formed in 1968/69 – 2001
- Country: Palestine
- Branch: Aerial arm of the Fatah
- Role: Fighter, helicopter and transport pilots
- Part of: Palestine Liberation Organization

Force 14 is the aerial arm of the Fatah, the largest Palestinian faction within the Palestine Liberation Organization. Envisioned as the nucleus of a future Palestinian Air Force, Force 14 personnel included both fighter, helicopter and transport pilots. Nevertheless, its main role within the PLO has been political rather than military, and its activities centered on cargo and transportation. It is not known to have participated in any operations against Israel.

== History ==
=== Formation ===
Fatah's embryonic aerial unit was formed sometime in 1968/69 from a modest core of several dozen pilots and technicians trained in Algeria, Morocco and Libya. The original intention of its founders had been to train pilots for the execution of suicide missions against strategic targets in Israel. This soon changed, however, and the unit was seen as a first step in the formation of a Palestinian Air Force which would be operated in coordination with the air forces of other Arab countries. When Fatah forces were reorganized in the summer of 1971, the unit was attached to the Palestinian Liberation Army's Yarmouk brigade and was stationed in Syria. In 1972, however, it was detached from the brigade and attached to the Fatah's general staff, the Central Operations Room. It was at this point that it received the name "Force 14", after its extension number at Fatah headquarters.

=== Growth ===
Since its founding, Force 14 had been sending pilots and technicians to train with various Arab, Communist and Third World nations. These were absorbed by the air force of Syria, Algeria and Libya, as well as in various Warsaw Pact air arms. 1972 saw Algeria accepting a group of 15-18 Palestinian cadets for fighter pilot training, destined to fly Syrian Air Force MiGs. As the PLO developed working relations with various governments, its military means and capabilities grew. In August 1978, 32 pilots and 60 mechanics returned from various training courses, and a 150 were in training in the Eastern Bloc a year later. Fatah had also initiated a military assistance programme, and Force 14 became a useful instrument of Palestinian diplomacy. Its personnel were sent to assist Idi Amin's Ugandan Air Force in 1976 and delivered arms and supplies to the Sandinistas in Nicaragua after their victory. Force 14 also provided helicopter and fighters pilots for the Nicaraguan war against the Contras, as well as crews for Aeronica, a local airline. The PLO may have also established several of its own small airlines to operate its cargo planes. These served as both a cover for PLO activities as well as the nucleus of a future Palestinian airline.

Following Syria's break with the PLO and its expulsion from Lebanon in the wake of the 1982 Lebanon War, Force 14 relocated its headquarters and the bulk of its personnel to the Yemen Arab Republic, although it maintained a presence in various other Arab countries, including Algeria, Libya and Iraq. In November 1982 a Force 14 pilot crashed while flying a MiG-21 fighter in Yemen, which at this time appears to have provided the force with all its fixed-wing training. Helicopter training was reportedly provided by Libya. In 1985 The PLO was reported to have leased the Island of Kamaran from Yemeni authorities to serve as a base for Force 14. Two years later the PLO was also reported to have acquired four McDonnell Douglas DC-8s, operating them from Yemen under the colours of the Red Crescent.

=== Decline ===
The signing of the Oslo Accords in September 1993 brought about the establishment of the Palestinian National Authority. With the opening of Gaza International Airport, the PNA established a 200-strong Aviation Police (Shurta al-Jawiya), subordinate to the Palestinian Civil Aviation Department and based on Force 14 personnel. Consisting mainly of guards and security personnel, the unit initially also comprised crews responsible for maintaining and operating the authority's fleet of three Mil Mi-17 helicopters. These, however, were all destroyed by the Israeli Air Force on December 3, 2001, during the Second Intifada.

The current state and activities of Force 14 are unknown, though it was reportedly still sending recruits on various training courses throughout the world in the mid 1990s.

== Known commanders ==
- Usama al-'Ali – first commander
- Colonel Husayn Uwayda
- Colonel Shukri Tabbet
- Brigadier Fayiz Zaydan

== See also ==
- Force 17
