= History of the Hellenic Air Force =

The Hellenic Aviation was first established in 1911 with help from French experts. The air force of Greece or the Hellenic Air Force participated in the Balkan Wars, World War I, the Asia Minor War, World War II, the Greek Civil War, the Korean War and the Turkish invasion of Cyprus.

== Establishment and first actions in the Balkan Wars ==
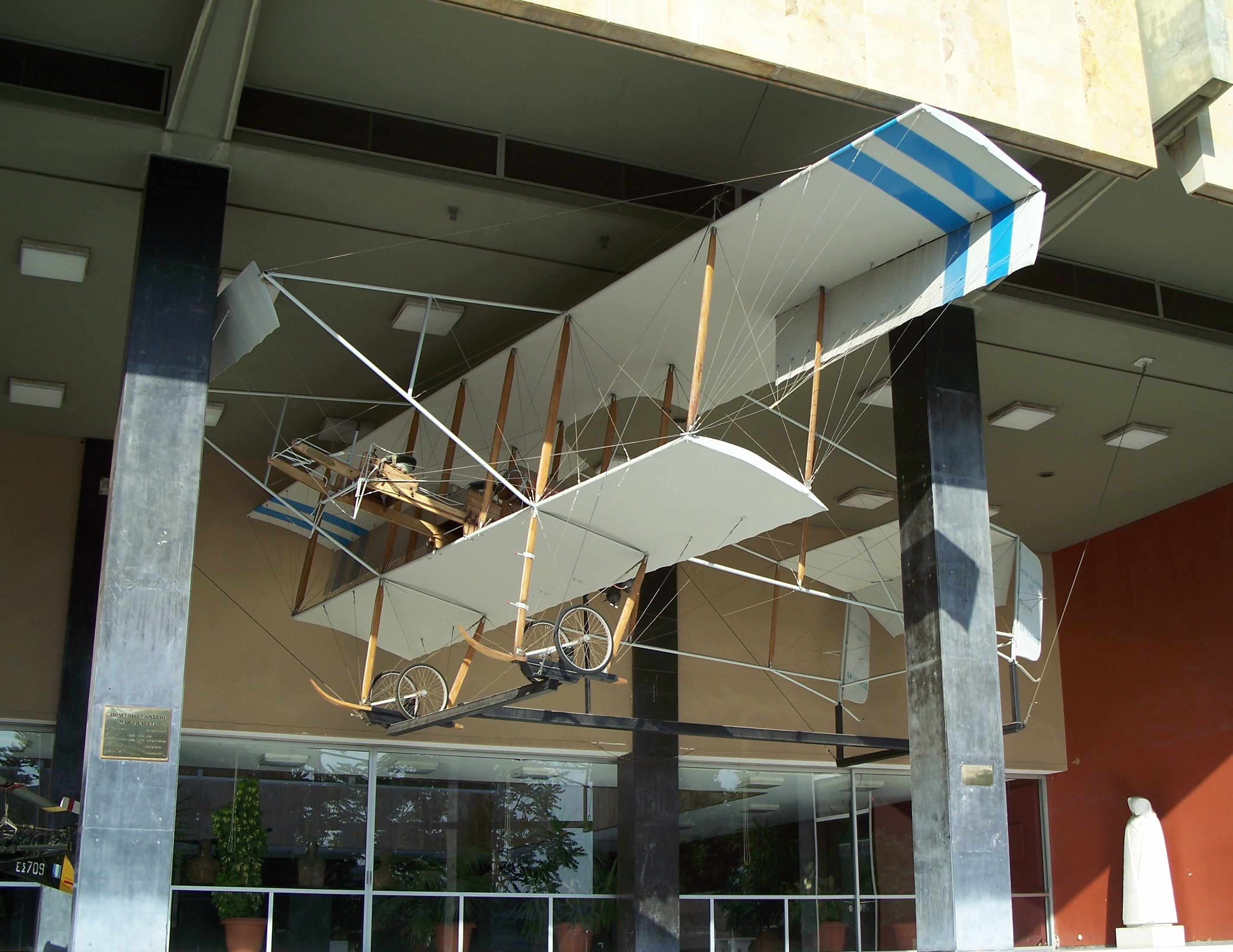
The Farman HF.III was the first military airplane of Greece

In 1911 the Greek government appointed French specialists to form the Hellenic Aviation Service. Six Greek officers were sent to France for training, while the first Farman type airplanes were ordered. The first Greek aviator was Emmanuel Argyropoulos who flew in a privately owned Nieuport 4G nicknamed Alkion on 8 February 1912. The first military flight was made on 13 May of that year by Lieutenant Dimitrios Kamberos. In June Kamberos flew a Farman HF.III nicknamed Daedalos that had been converted into a seaplane setting the foundations of the Naval Aviation. That September the Greek Army fielded its first squadron, the Aviators Company (Λόχος Αεροπόρων).

== Inter-war years ==
Until 1930 Greek Aviation was split in the separate Army Aviation and Naval Aviation services, but in that year, the Aviation Ministry was founded with Prime Minister Eleftherios Venizelos as its first minister, establishing the Air Force as the third branch of the Hellenic Armed Forces. In 1931, the Air Force Academy, the Scholi Ikaron, was founded.

== World War II and Civil War ==
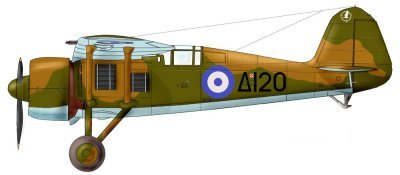
The PZL P-24 was the main Greek fighter in the Greco-Italian War

During the Greco-Italian War, despite its small size and obsolete equipment, the Hellenic Air Force gave good account of itself against the Italians, but after 65 days of war, the RHAF had lost 31 officers killed and seven wounded, plus four NCOs killed and five wounded. Meanwhile, the number of combat aircraft had dropped to 28 fighters and 7 bombers. The rest of the air force was destroyed mostly by the Germans in April 1941. The Air Force was rebuilt in the Middle East as part of the Royal Air Force, flying Martin Baltimores, Spitfires and Hurricanes. After Greece's liberation in 1944, it returned home and subsequently participated in the Greek Civil War.

== Civil war ==
In 1946 Greek manned RAF squadrons were converted into the Royal Hellenic Air Force, that operated a variety of plane types, mainly British.

During the first two years the government used the Air Force for reconnaissance and air supply missions to isolated areas. With artillery in short supply the Air Force was also used as "flying artillery" but the pilots had difficulty locating an enemy hidden and moving only by night. The equipment was not suited for counter-insurgency operations and cooperation with the Army was faulty.

In 1948 the RHAF was upgraded with US assistance. At the same time the communists decided to abandon guerilla tactics and try to hold ground like regular army. The introduction of the Curtiss Helldiver dive-bomber and the napalm bombs allowed to attack the communist troops and made possible victory in 1949.

== Post-war developments ==
In the 1950s the force was rebuilt and organized according to NATO standards. The Hellenic Air Force participated in the Korean War with a transport flight unit. Greece participated in NATO nuclear weapons sharing until 2001, using A-7 Corsair IIs to deploy U.S. tactical B61 nuclear bombs from Araxos Air Base.

Until the late 1980s the Air Force deployed Nike-Hercules Missiles armed with U.S. nuclear warheads. As a result of Greco-Turkish tensions around the 1974 Turkish invasion in Cyprus, the U.S. removed its nuclear weapons from Greek and Turkish alert units to storage. Greece saw this as another pro-Turkish move by NATO and withdrew its forces from NATO's military command structure from 1974 to 1980.

In 1988 the first 3rd generation fighters were introduced, marking the beginning of a new era: The first Mirage 2000 EG/BG aircraft were delivered to the 114th Combat Wing and equipped the 331 and 332 squadrons. In January 1989, the first F-16 C/D Block 30 arrived in Nea Anchialos (111th Combat Wing) and were allocated between the 330 and 346 squadrons. On 29 March 1991 the RF-84F were retired from service after 34 years and 7 months of operational life. In November 1992 more RF-4E were delivered to the 348 Tactical Reconnaissance Squadron.

In 1997 the reception of third generation aircraft continued. In July, delivery of forty F-16 Block 50 begun. The new aircraft, equipped with the LANTIRN navigation and targeting pod as well as AIM-120 AMRAAM and AGM-88 HARM missiles, were allocated to the 341 and 347 squadrons.

In 2005 Greece was among the first countries to add the F-16 Block 52+ to its inventory. Sixty of these aircraft were acquired and another thirty are currently in order. This advanced F-16 type is an improved version of the Block 50 featuring a more powerful radar, better communications systems and an upgraded engine.

Since the 1970s issues arose between Greece and Turkey over sovereignty rights in the Aegean Sea. The conflict over military flight activities has led to a practice of continuous tactical military provocations. Turkish aircraft regularly fly in the zones over which Greece claims control and Greek aircraft intercept, as a consequence they frequently engage in simulated dogfights, "testing" each other's will and capabilities. Mock dogfights are so usual now that are listed in the "daily activities" section of the official website of Turkey's chief of general staff. Confrontations between Turkish and Greek military warplanes decreased for several years but escalated sharply in 2014

Sometimes these dogfights cause casualties and losses for both the Turkish and Greek Air Forces:

- On 18 June 1992 a Greek Mirage F1CG crashed during a low altitude dogfight with two Turkish F-16's.
- On 8 October 1996 a pair of Greek Mirage 2000s intercepted a pair of Turkish F-16s. One of the Turkish F-16s was shot down by a Greek Mirage 2000.
- On 23 May 2006 a Turkish F-16 and a Greek F-16 collided near the island of Karpathos during a Turkish reconnaissance flight. Following the accident Turkish Chief of General Staff visited Athens to prevent further tension.
- On 12 April 2018 a Greek Mirage 2000 crashed into the Aegean near Skyros following an interception sortie prompted by possible Turkish Air Force activity over that sea. The pilot, 34-year-old Georgios Baltadoros, died as a result. No visual identification of a target or use of munitions was reported.
