= Singapore Wing, Malayan Auxiliary Air Force =

Malayan Auxiliary Air Force (Singapore Wing)
- Active: 1950–1960
- Country: Singapore
- Role: Flying training
- Mottos: Latin: Usque Ad Astra ("All the way to the heavens")

Commanders
- Notable commanders: Wing Commander Tan Kay Hai, DFC

The Singapore Wing, Malayan Auxiliary Air Force (MAAF) was active from its formation in June 1950, until its disbandment on 23 September 1960.

== History ==
=== Squadron ===
The Singapore Squadron was formed in 1950 to train volunteers to fly to RAF wings standard. There were two other squadrons, one at Kuala Lumpur and the other at Penang. Flying training was carried out at weekends and this took place at RAF Tengah. Initially, the Singapore Squadron was equipped with four Tiger Moths and these were supplemented with four North American Harvards a type which was to remain in MAAF service up to 1957. During 1957, MAAF saw the introduction of a more modern training aircraft, namely the de Havilland Chipmunk, which was to replace the Tiger Moths and Harvards. In between the years, three Mk.24s Spitfires were received from the RAF. In 1952, due to age and structural limitations the Spitfires were withdrawn before any of the locally trained pilots could have a chance to fly them.

=== Fighter Control Unit (FCU) ===
In 1954, the RAF conducted a recruitment exercise for volunteers to serve in the Fighter Control Unit as Fighter Plotters and Radar Operators. Their role was somewhat quite similar to those personnel who manned the Chain Home (CH) System in U.K. They helped to man the RAF Control and Reporting System for the defence of the island. The ground syllabus was taught at the HQ in Beach Road on two evenings a week whilst a "live" training session was conducted on alternate Sundays at RAF Tengah. A two weeks Annual Camp was arranged each year. This gave the opportunity for the volunteers to have two weeks full-time training. There were occasions when the Singapore Squadron went up country to join up with the Kuala Lumpur and Penang Squadrons for their Annual Camp.

== Aircraft operated ==
RAF Tengah was home to the Malayan Auxiliary Air Force (Singapore Squadron) from June 1950, where it supported the MAAF fixed wing training. From the squadron's beginning in 1950 to its disbandment in 1960, MAAF operated the following types of aircraft:

The Fleet
Aircraft	Role	Number	Dates
De Havilland Tiger Moth	Trainer	4	1950–1957
North American Harvard	Trainer	4	1951–1957
North American Harvard	Trainer	2	1954–1957
Supermarine Spitfire Mk.24	Fighter	3	1951–1952
DHC Chipmunk T10	Trainer	4	1957–1960

Of the three Spitfires operated, PK683 is the only known survivor of all ex-MAAF aircraft, and is on display at the Solent Sky Museum in Southampton.

DHC-T.10 Chipmunk WP977 which served with MAAF 1957–60 survives as a cockpit section only (under-long-term restoration Cambridge, United Kingdom).

== Disbandment ==
On 16 June 1960, the Fighter Control Unit was disbanded. The commander, Malayan Auxiliary Air Force, Air Vice-Marshal Ronald Ramsay Rae, took the salute at the farewell parade held at the unit's headquarters at the old Kallang Airport. Air Vice-Marshal Rae was also the Air Officer Commanding, No. 224 Group, RAF. Three months later on 23 September 1960, a final parade was held at Kallang again, this time to mark the disbandment of the Singapore Wing of the MAAF. Wing Commander K. H. Tan, DFC, the unit's Commanding Officer and Squadron Leader Jimmy K.T. Chew came in for special mention.

Wing Commander Tan Kay Hai was one of the 114 Singapore wartime pilots who were sent to Canada under the British Commonwealth Air Training Plan (BCATP). Shot down over France in June 1944 after the Normandy Landings, he was captured, but escaped within eight months and made his way to England. His operations with the RAF won him the Distinguished Flying Cross.

Squadron Leader Jimmy Chew also saw service with the RAF during the war. He was a prisoner of the Japanese in Java for three and a half years.

The disbandment of the Singapore Wing brought to a close the short, but colourful existence of this volunteer organisation.
