= Turkish Army Aviation Command =

Land Aviation Command
- Kara Havacılık Komutanlığı
- Founded: 1957
- Country: Turkey
- Type: Military aviation
- Part of: Turkish Army
- Garrison/HQ: Ankara
- Engagements: Turkish invasion of Cyprus; PKK-Turkey conflict; Operation Olive Branch

Commanders
- Current commander: Brig. Zeynel Abidin Erginbaş

Insignia
- Locket

- Wing symbol

The Turkish Aviation Command and Turkish Army Aviation Command (Turkish: Kara Havacılık Komutanlığı), was established in 1948 under the name of "artillery crafting" within the Turkish Land Forces artillery school. It is the administrative center of the Turkish Land Aviation School in Isparta, which trains officers and petty officers to the Turkish army. The airbase has played an important role in the Cyprus Operation.

== History ==
Since 1968, the rotary wing aircraft taken from the Turkish Air Force inventory joined the union. Its mission is to provide air support to Turkish land troops and to support the battle by making transport reconnaissance.

In the coup attempt on July 15, 2016, a group of soldiers attempted a coup attempt under the leadership of Ünsal Coşkun, who served as Commander of the Army Aviation School at the rank of brigadier general. Former brigadier Coşkun declared himself the Commander of the Aviation and managed some helicopters used in the coup until he went to Akıncı Air Base.

Also a part of the Turkish Army's aviation force is the Unmanned Aerial Vehicle Systems Brigade (tr:İHAS Tugayı), located at Kahramankazan, Ankara.

== Formations ==
=== Affiliated units ===
- 1st Land Aviation Regiment (Güvercinlik Army Air Base)
- 2nd Land Aviation Regiment (Erhaç Airport, Malatya)
- 3rd Land Aviation Regiment (Gaziemir Air Base, İzmir)
- 4th Land Aviation Regiment (Samandıra Army Air Base, Istanbul)
- 7. Land Air Group Command (Diyarbakır Air Base)
  - Training and Exercise Central Command (Bodrum-Imsik Airport, Muğla)

=== Vehicles ===
T-129 ATAK	Attack helicopter	54	Turkey	Armed with Roketsan Cirit and UMTAS weapon systems. A total of 51 pieces have been ordered.
Sikorsky UH-60 Black Hawk	Multipurpose helicopter	106	USA	S-70A17/19: 56, S-70A28: 20 ve S-70D28: 30 helikopter.
Eurocopter AS-532UL Cougar	Multipurpose helicopter	48	Turkey	Produced under license by TAI.
Agusta-Bell AB206B3 JetRanger	Multipurpose helicopter	25	Italy	It is produced under license under the name JetRanger by Bell 206 Agusta.
Agusta-Bell AB205A1	Multipurpose helicopter	69	Italy	
Bell UH-1H/2020-ASAM	Multipurpose helicopter	52	USA	
Agusta-Bell 204	Multipurpose helicopter	15	Italy	
Bell UH-1H	Multipurpose helicopter	85	USA	
Bell AH-1P Cobra	Attack helicopter	23	USA	With the production of T-129 ATAK, it will gradually be out of service.
Bell AH-1W SuperCobra	Attack helicopter	9	USA	3 of them were purchased in 2012. Equipped with Hellfire II K2.
Bell OH-58B	Reconnaissance helicopter	3	USA	
CH-47F	Transport helicopter	11	USA	
TUSAŞ T-70	Multipurpose helicopter	22	Turkey	

=== Unmanned aerial vehicles ===
Bayraktar UAV	Tactic UAV	12	Turkey
Bayraktar Mini UAV	Mini UAV	164	Turkey
Malazgirt Mini UAV	Mini UAV	4	Turkey

== Commanders ==
- Maj.Gen. Salih Ulusoy (2008-2012)
- Maj.Gen. Hamza Koçyiğit (2012-2015)
- Maj.Gen. Hakan Atınç (2015-2016)
- İdris Feyzi Okan (2016-2017) (was exported, see also: 2016 Turkish coup d'état attempt)
- Brig. Osman Dirmencioğlu (2017-2019)
- Brig. Oğuz Baykal (2019-2023)

== See also ==
- Turkish Land Aviation School (Isparta, Turkey)
