= School of Army Aviation (Turkey) =

Coordinates: 37.8628558°N 30.3610125°E

School of Army Aviation (Turkey) Kara Havacılık Okulu
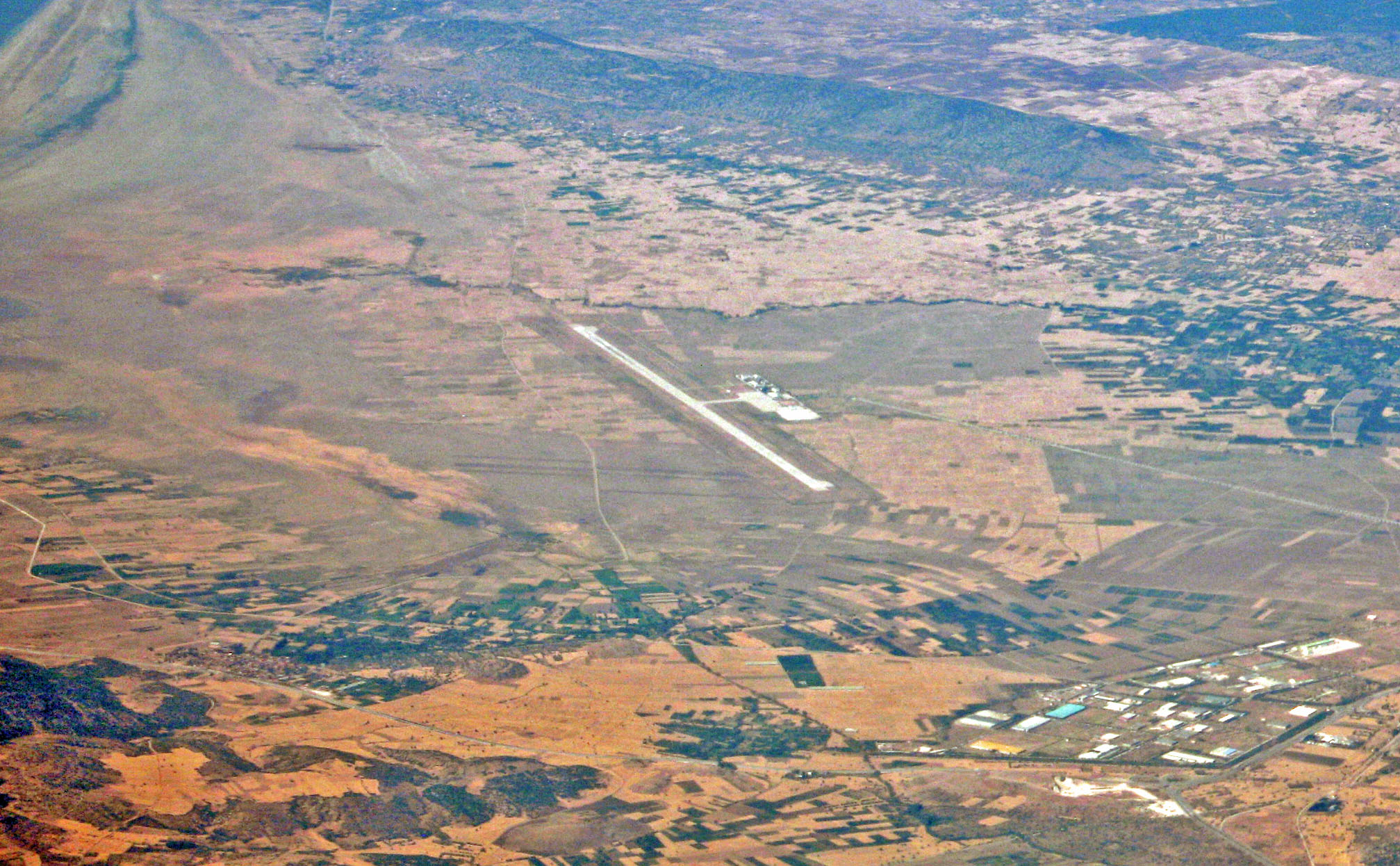
- The new school campus, which has been moved from Ankara to Isparta, is next to Süleyman Demirel Airport in Isparta.
- Active: 1946 - 2016 (Ankara); 2016 — present (Isparta)
- Country: Turkey
- Allegiance: Turkish Army
- Branch: Army
- Type: Training School
- Role: Flight Training, Development
- Part of: Turkish Army Aviation Command
- Garrison/HQ: Isparta; Süleyman Demirel Airport; Ankara; Güvercinlik Army Air Base

Commanders
- Current commander: Brig. Gen. Nadir Gündüz
- Ceremonial chief: Col. Alper Naldöken

Insignia
- Official badge

The Turkish School of Army Aviation (Kara Havacılık Okulu) based at Isparta, is one of the schools of the Turkish Army and is responsible for the training and development of the Turkish Army Aviation Command personnel and equipment. It was founded in 1948 under the name of artillery excavation within the artillery school. In 1957, it was removed from the artillery school and took the name of aviation. Kara Aviation School continued its educational activities until 2019 at its campus next to the command building in Güvercinlik in Ankara. After the new air base project of the Turkish Army, it was decided to move to Isparta. The training of military aviators within the Turkish Army Aviation Command in Ankara continues at the school campus located in Isparta. The school campus is next to Süleyman Demirel Airport.

== See also ==
- Turkish Army Aviation Command
- Turkish Air Force
- Turkish Army
- Army aviation
