= Air Force of the Polish Army =

Soviet-controlled Polish Air Force between 1943 and 1947

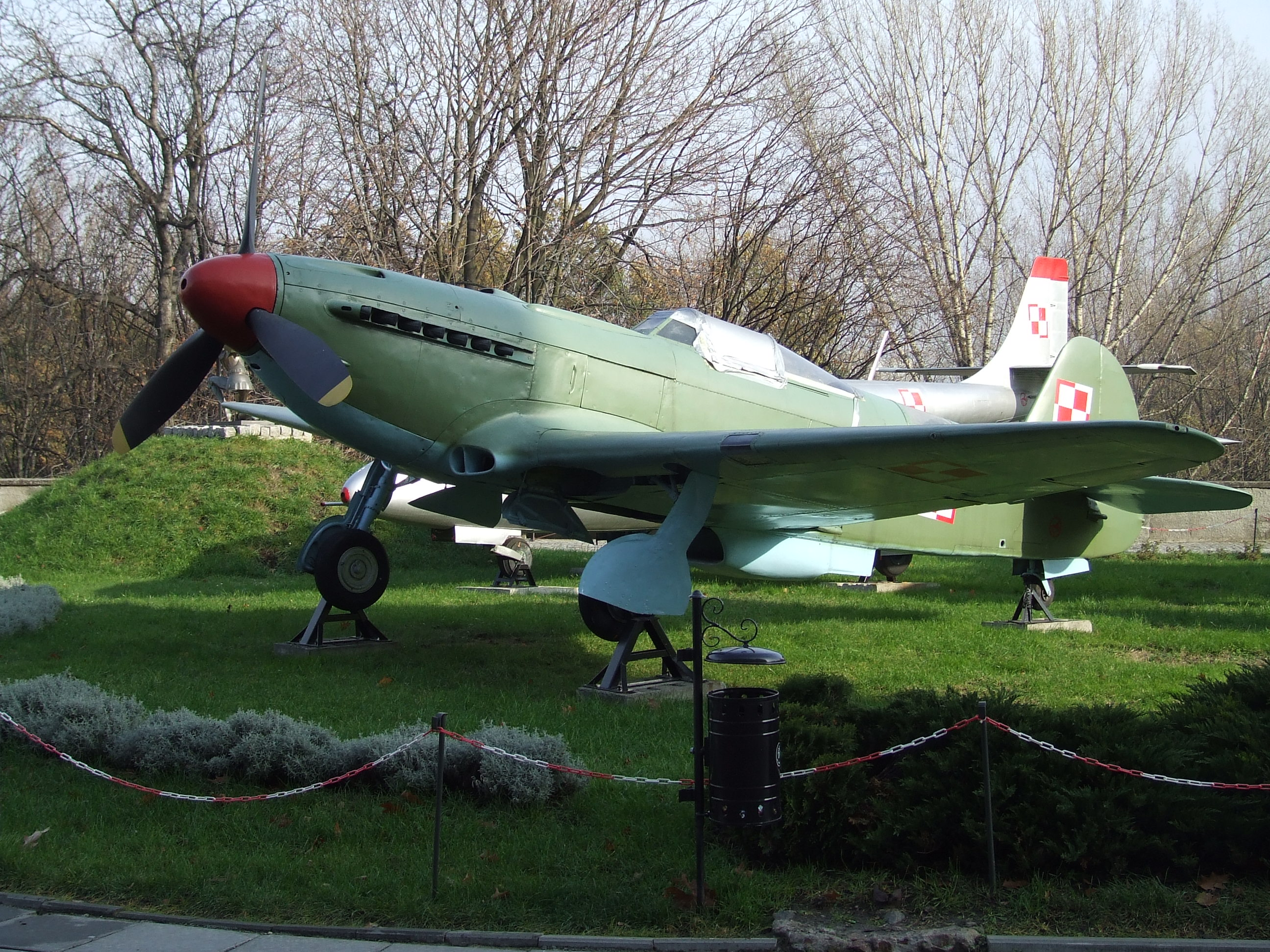
Yak-9 with Polish markings.

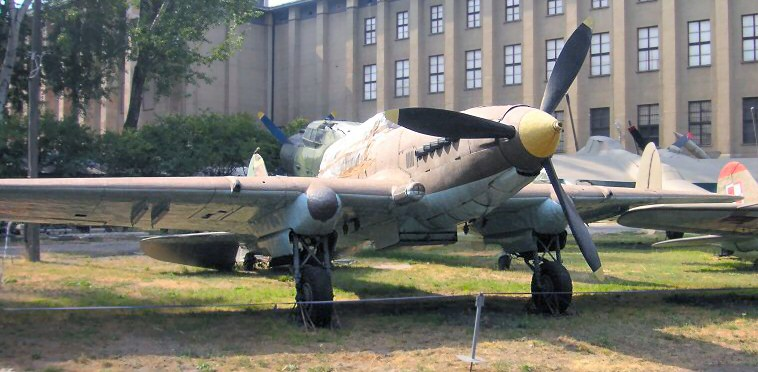
Il-2m3 with Polish markings.

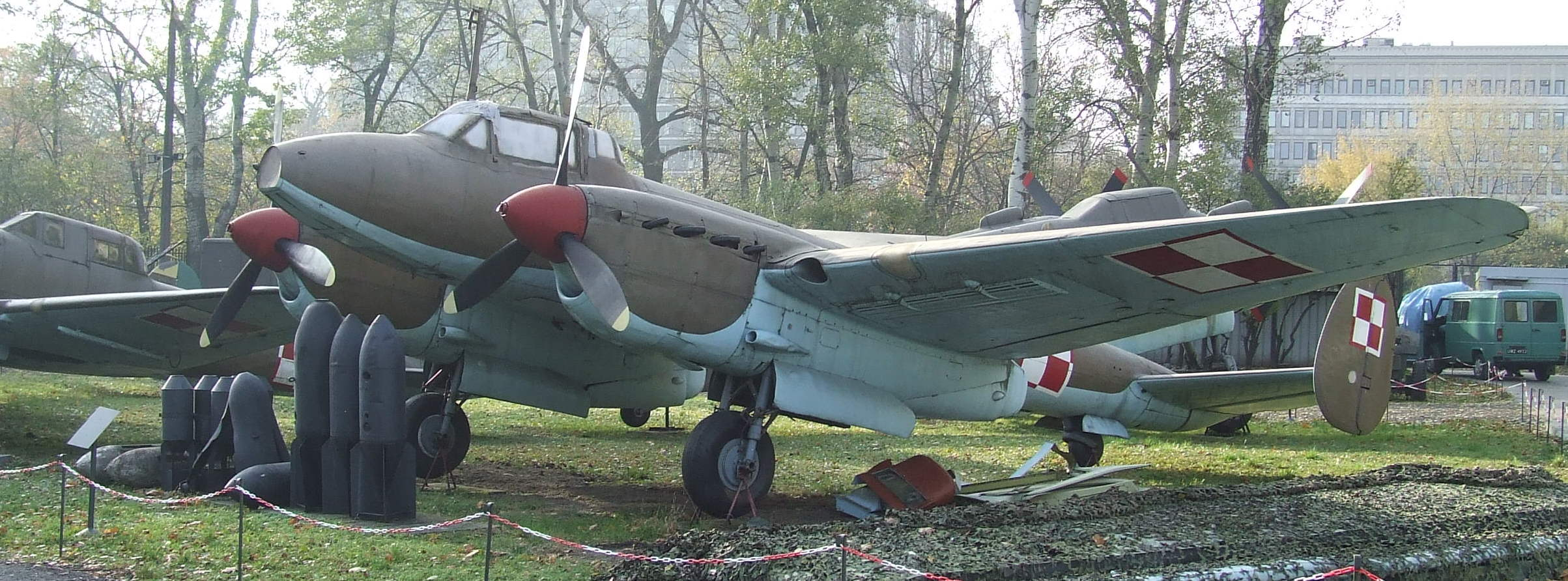
Pe-2 with Polish markings.

The Air Force of the Polish Army (Polish: Lotnictwo Wojska Polskiego), unofficially known as the People's Polish Air Force was the name of the Soviet-controlled Polish Air Force in the USSR between 1943 and 1947 created alongside the Polish People's Army (Polish: Ludowe Wojsko Polskie), a subordinate to the Red Army. It was the primary Polish air force formation within the Polish Armed Forces in the East during World War II.

== Formation ==
Setting up the first combat unit – the 1st Independent Fighter Squadron (1. Samodzielna Eskadra Lotnictwa Myśliwskiego) – started on July 7, 1943. As of July 23, 1943, their first training airfield was Grigoryevskoye, about 15 km south of Moscow. On August 20, 1943, the Squadron was renamed as the Polish 1st Fighter Regiment, and on October 6, as the 1st Fighter Regiment "Warszawa" ("Warsaw").

On April 1, 1944, two more Polish units were formed at Grigorievskoye: the 2nd Bomber Regiment "Kraków" and the 103rd Independent Liaison Aviation Squadron. In June 1944 the 1st Fighter Reg. and 2nd Bomber Reg. were moved to Gostomel airfield near Kiev. At the same time about 600 Poles were sent to Soviet aviation schools in Yegoryevsk, Chkalov, Buguruslan, Sorochinsk, Volsk and Kinel. On June 5, 1944, at the Headquarters of the Polish Army, an Air Force section was created to command existing Polish AF units. The first commander was Col. Józef Smaga.

On August 16 and August 17, 1944, the 1st and 2nd Regiments landed at their first Polish Air Base at Dys near Lublin. At this time the AF of the PA was reinforced by the Soviet 611th Ground-Attack Regiment (later, personnel in this unit was partially replaced with Poles, and the regiment was renamed as the Polish 3rd Ground-Attack Reg.). A few days later, on August 19, all units were moved to airfields in Zadybie Stare and Wola Rowska – near the front line.

On August 30, 1944, all three Regiments, reinforced by the Communication Company and Liaison Section, were combined into the Polish 1st Air Force Division (later renamed as the 4th Mixed Air Force Division). At that time, the new unit was equipped with 106 combat aircraft (Yak-1, Il-2 and Po-2).

In September 1944, in the area of Kharkiv and Kazan, Soviet authorities started to form the Polish 1st Mixed Air Force Corps (at first with Soviet personnel, gradually replaced with Polish graduates of Soviet air force schools). The new Corps were equipped with 303 aircraft (Pe-2, Yak-9, Yak-3 and Il-2). In February 1945, the units were moved to Poland on airfields in Łowicz, Sochaczew, Łódź and Kutno.

In late August and the beginning of September 1944, the 103rd Independent Liaison Aviation Squadron, cooperating already with the 1st Polish Army, was joined by three more units of this type: 3rd Squadron, in coordination with the 2nd Polish Army, and the 4th and 5th Sqns., subordinated to Communication Command of the Polish Army.

On October 31, 1944, all Polish aviation units were subordinated to the newly created Command of the Air Force of the Polish Army with Maj. Gen. Teodor Połynin. This headquarters was formed on the basis of the headquarters of the 6th Air Army, which disbanded in order to form the new Polish headquarters.

At the beginning of November, the next units were created: the 12th Medical Aviation Regiment, 13th Transport Aviation Regiment, 17th Liaison Aviation Regiment, and the first Polish Aviation School in Zamość with Józef Smaga as commander, promoted to the rank of Bryg. Gen. The new school started teaching on January 2, 1945. Polish pilots were also trained in the 15th Independent Reserve Air Force Regiment, formed on November 28, 1944.

In December 1944, the AF of the PA took over control from Soviet Air Forces in the 7th Air Base Area. Two more aviation units reinforced the AF of the PA in March 1945. Those were the 6th Independent Transport Aviation Squadron formed at Okęcie Airport, conducting missions for the Temporary Government as well as the Headquarters of the Polish Army, and the 14th Independent Air Reconnaissance and Correction of Artillery Fire Regiment.

== Combat missions ==
The Air Force of the Polish Army went to combat at the last stage of the Lublin-Brest Offensive. Between August 23 and September 2, 1944, the 1st Air Force Division supported the 1st Polish Army on bridgeheads near Warka and Magnuszew by making 66 combat flights. After September 10, 2nd Bomber Reg. received an order to support an attack in the direction of Praga district of Warsaw, but due to bad weather the regiment didn't take part in the battle. On the following night, between September 11 and September 12, the 2nd Regiment attacked 19th Panzer Division in the area of Nowe Bródno dropping 70 50-kg bombs, 1819 bombs of smaller weight and 51 flares during 50 flights.

After capturing Praga, the 1st Air Force Division supported the attack of Polish 3rd Infantry Division in the area of Czerniaków, from September 15 to September 19, and after September 19, attacked German artillery in the area of Ujazdów Park, Botanical Garden, Łazienki Park, Pole Mokotowskie, Siekierki and the Warsaw University of Technology. During the Warsaw Uprising all units of the 1st Air Force Division made 609 flights. Within this number, 442 flights were made by the 2nd Regiment – 259 of them were attacks on German positions (the regiment dropped 50 tons of bombs) – and 183 were supply flights for fighters in Warsaw (33 tons of food and 72 boxes of weapons and ammunition). At the same time the 103rd Independent Liaison Aviation Squadron operating from Soplicowo made reconnaissance flights for the 1st Polish Army.

In the next stage of the war, between November 1, 1944, and January 13, 1945, the 1st AF Division, renamed as the 4th Mixed AF Division, took part in preparation for the Vistula-Oder Offensive. In 201 flights, it collected data about the locations of German forces in the area of the 1st Polish Army's planned attack, to the outer limit of 80–120 km behind the front line. Apart from that, each regiment of the division had its own separate tasks. The 1st Fighter Regiment was fighting against the Luftwaffe's air reconnaissance while the 2nd Regiment between November 1 and 3, made 130 flights bombing German positions in the areas of Sadów, Dąbrowa, Łomianki and Dziekanów Polski.

On January 14, the Vistula-Oder Offensive started, but due to cloudy weather, until January 19, only the 2nd Regiment took part in combat, bombing enemies' positions in the areas of Modlin, Leszno, Błonie and Sochaczew. The 3rd Ground-Attack Regiment joined the battle on January 16, and under the cover of the 1st Fighter Regiment, attacked German positions in the area of Modlin, Adamówek, Palmiry, Dziekanów, Sieraków and Kaliszki supporting the 47th Soviet Army. After the liberation of Warsaw the 2nd and 3rd Regiments were attacking retreating enemy troops while the 1st Regiment was defending Warsaw as well as reconstructed bridges over the Vistula after the Luftwaffe attacks. During the first period of the Vistula-Oder Offensive the 1st Reg. made 221 combat flights, the 2nd – 107 and the 3rd Reg – 81. Apart from the combat, units of the 13th Transport Aviation Regiment delivered 4620 kg of weapons and ammunition and 176 officers to the western bank of the Vistula during 666 flights.

Due to the fast advance of Allied forces in the West, the 4 Mixed Division was moved to the Sanniki airfield, and later to Bydgoszcz. From there, aircraft of the division began the next stage of the Vistula-Oder Offensive against the Pomeranian Wall. First, the 3rd Regiment went into action. From February 4 to February 8, the regiment made reconnaissance flights over the Wall in the areas of Szczecinek, Wałcz, Górnica, Barwice, Czaplinek, Węgorzewo Koszalińskie and Białogard, under the cover of the 282nd Soviet Fighter Division. Between February 9 and February 15, the 3rd Regiment attacked German troops surrounded in the area of Piła during 141 flights, and collected data about the enemy during 62 reconnaissance flights. Later on February 15 and February 16, the 3rd and 1st Regiments were attacking the remains of German forces retreating from the Piła area to the rear of the 1st Polish Army near Tarnówka. On February 19, those two units attacked ground targets in the area of Orla, Wierzchowo, Złocieniec and Szczecinek. Before that, on February 14, the 1st Regiment made reconnaissance flights over the airfield and eastern part of Piła. On February 20, the 3rd Regiment attacked rail transports in Szczecinek and Złocieniec. Apart from units of the 4th Division, the 103rd Independent Liaison Aviation Squadron also took part in the flights, bombing the fortifications of the Wall on the night of February 8 to February 9.

At this stage of the Offensive the 3rd Regiment made 391 combat flights (161 of them were reconnaissance flights), the 1st Regiment made 124 flights and the 2nd Regiment made 51 flights. The whole 4th Division destroyed over 300 wheeled vehicles, 21 locomotives, over 140 horse wagons, 163 railroad cars and much other military equipment. In this same period the Division lost six flying personnel and 5 aircraft (2 Yak-9, 2 Il-2 and 1 Po-2).

On March 1, the 3rd Reg. covered by the 1st Reg. attacked the German defence position on the southern edge of Bojursko in the area of Żabin, and on Hill 156.6, in preparation for the offensive of the 1st Polish Army in that direction. Later on the same day the two units supported an attack of their land forces in the area of Wierzchowo, Żabin and Żabinek. For the next two days the units supported an attack of the 1st Polish Army with direct fire and reconnaissance.

During the Battle of Kołobrzeg aircraft of the 4th Division were relocated to Mirosławiec. Among encountered difficulties were cloudy weather and problems with fuel supply (especially with the B-70 gasoline used by the Po-2). Due to such circumstances units of the 4th Division were flying only between March 9 – March 11 and March 13 – March 15, (the 2nd Reg. equipped with Po-2 flew only on the night of March 11 – March 12) while battle continued from March 5 to March 17. On those few days the 4th Division made 127 combat flights dropping 25 tons of bombs, sinking 1 transport ship and 4 barges, and destroying 9 batteries of mortars, 3 batteries of field artillery, 8 batteries of anti-aircraft artillery and many points of German defence.

After the battle, between March 19 and April 8, units of the 4th Mixed AF Division patrolled the shore of Baltic Sea between Kołobrzeg and Dziwnów, and made reconnaissance flights over German positions on Wolin and Chrząszczewska Island. The 1st Regiment also protected positions of the 1st Polish Army from attacks of the Luftwaffe. This same regiment conducted reconnaissance flights over the Chrząszczewska Island V-2 rocket launcher, later heavily damaged by the 3rd Regiment. Aircraft of the 2nd Regiment and 103rd Squadron patrolled Western Pomerania, tracking remnants of the German troops and giving coordinates to land forces.

The last great operation of the Air Force of the Polish Army in World War II was the Battle of Berlin. On April 14, the 4th Mixed Division was regrouped to the Baranówko airfield located 35 km to the east of the river Odra. On the night of April 15, just before the offensive, the 2nd Regiment attacked German positions near Bad Freienwalde, Neu Ranft, Neu Rüdnitz and Alt Reetz. On April 16, the Allied land forces began the Battle of the Oder-Neisse. In the morning of the first day of the operation the aircraft were useless due to thick fog over the Odra valley. In the evening, only a small group of Il-2's from the 3rd Regiment under protection of fighters from the 1st Regiment attacked German positions on the left bank of the river near Neu Rüdnitz. The situation was similar the next day, but on April 18 and April 19, air force actions were much more intensive. Aircraft of the 3rd Reg. gave close support to the attacking 1st Polish Army while pilots of the 1st Reg. fought with Luftwaffe and made reconnaissance flights for the 1st Polish and 61st Soviet Armies. The 103rd Squadron delivered written orders from the Soviet command posts to field commanders at the front and evacuated wounded soldiers on their way back. During this phase of battle Poles made 330 combat flights.

In the next stage of the final battle, between April 20 and April 24, the 4th Mixed AF Division provided air cover, especially during the crossing of the Alte Oder and Ruppiner Canal. At this time Il-2's attacked the German forces during the attack of the 1st Polish Army in the areas of Bernöwe, Oranienburg, Kremmen and Nauen. During this phase of battle Poles made 305 combat flights including 72 of them by night.

On April 24, the Polish 1st Mixed Air Force Corps, commanded by Brig. Gen. Filip Aglacow, completed its relocation to airfields in the area of Myślibórz, but only the 2nd Ground-Attack Division and the 3rd Fighter Division because the 1st Bomb Division was still training in central Poland. Those two units increased the strength of the main group of the Polish Air Force almost four times up to four fighter regiments, four ground-attack regiments and one bomber regiment. On the first day only fighters from the 3rd Division took part in the battle covering units crossing the Hohenzollern Canal near Hennigsdorf during 41 combat flights.

Between April 25 and April 29, Polish aircraft discovered a threat from Army Detachment Steiner. The most intensive day of combat between the Polish aviation 1st Army and Steiner's group was April 26. On this day the 2nd Division and 3rd Regiment made 412 combat flights attacking German troops near Löwensberg, Zehdenick, Bercksdorf and Nassenheide in support of units on the bridgehead over the Ruppiner Canal, while the fighters of the 3rd Division and the 1st Regiment made 128 combat flights on that day, fighting against the Luftwaffe that tried to help Steiner's Group.

After the destruction of Army Detachment Steiner all units of the 1st Mixed AF Division and two divisions of the 1st Mixed AF Corps supported the attack of the 1st Polish Army to the Elbe River. Polish land forces reached the river on May 3. On the same date, in the area of Havelberg and Wulkau, Polish aircraft met with groups of P-51 Mustangs of United States Eighth Air Force in the air three times. On the next day the commander of the 1st Belorussian Front, Georgy Zhukov gave an order to stop all combat missions of the air force except reconnaissance.

Apart from those main combat units of the AF of the PA other, smaller units like the 17th Liaison Aviation Regiment and the 13th Transport Aviation Regiment were making many flights transporting officers and supply. Also, the 12th Medical Aviation Regiment took part in an operation evacuating 1296 soldiers of the 2nd Polish Army to hospitals in Poznań.

=== Contribution of the Air Force of the Polish Army to World War II ===
The main task of the Air Force of the Polish Army was support to land forces. Here are the Air Force's statistics for this task:

Ground attacks:

- 13,620 flights including 5,800 combat flights
- 1.300 wheeled vehicles destroyed
- 290 railroad cars destroyed
- 28 locomotives destroyed
- 25 tanks destroyed
- 4 aircraft destroyed on airfields
- 1 transport ship sunk
- 4 barges sunk
- over 400 field artillery batteries destroyed
- 25 mortar batteries destroyed
- 371 buildings burned

Air combat:

- 16 aircraft shot down in 57 battles

Casualties:

- 94 troops including 25 KIA, rest DOW (died of wounds),
- 36 aircraft destroyed
- 24 aircraft damaged

== Transformation ==
A checkerboard is used as the national marking for the aircraft of the Air Force of the Polish Army since 1st December 1918

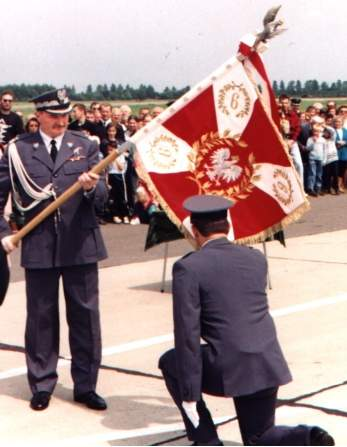
Standard of the 9th Fighter Squadron regiment

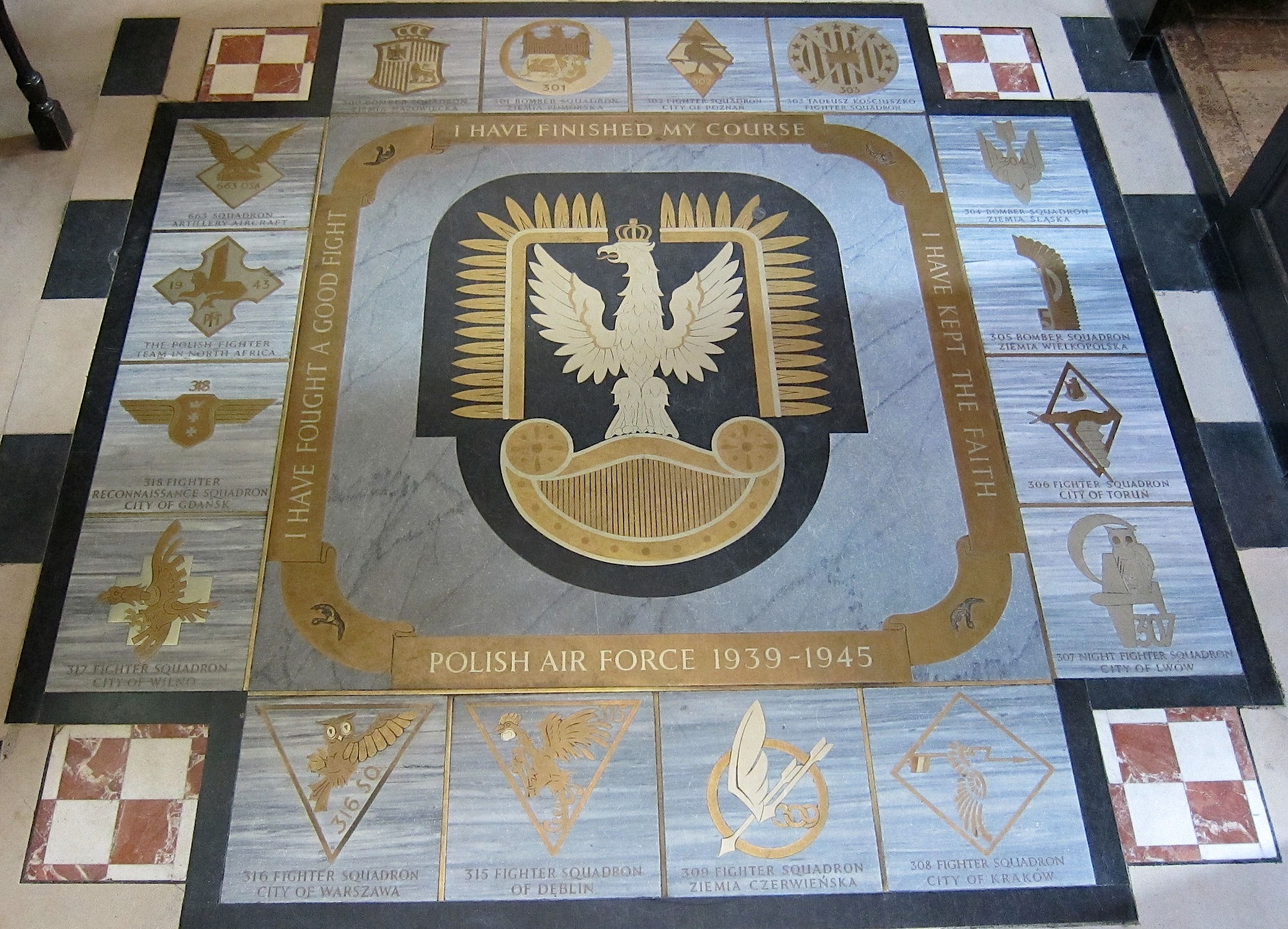
Polish Air Force of France and Great Britain memorial St Clements Church London

During the first days after the war, 67 of the oldest aircraft were immediately withdrawn from the service, for personnel safety. Those were mainly the Po-2s, Il-2s and Jak-1s. Another task was to reduce the number of active servicemen. The plan was to decrease the number of soldiers to 12,314, including the 3150 commissioned officers. The oldest privates, the non-commissioned officers, and about 300 Soviet officers that were serving in the Air Force of the Polish Army during the war, were first to be demobilized.

On 11 July 1945 Lt. Gen. Połynin ordered that all national marks on aircraft be changed to Polish chessboards. Up to this time all machines were painted like aircraft of the Soviet Air Force with additional Polish chessboards on the sides of planes (the width of the Polish mark was between 300 mm and 350 mm so it was slightly bigger than marks used by the Polish Air Force in Great Britain).

Also the structure was gradually changed. At the beginning of July 1945, the 2nd Night Bomber Regiment "Kraków" was rearmed changing the Po-2s to the Il-2m3s and renamed as the 2nd Ground-Attack Reg. "Kraków". The Headquarters of the 1 Mixed Air Force Corps and some auxiliary units were disbanded as of July 25, including: the 12th Medical Aviation Regiment, 2nd Saxonian Independent Headquarters Squadron, 3007th Field Post Office, 13th Transport Aviation Regiment, 1596th Regiment of Air Defence, 901st Company of Anti-Aircraft Machine Guns, 7th Technic and Technical Operationality Company, 22nd Company for Special Missions and the 5th Independent Camouflage Platoon. Meanwhile, some names were also changed: the 15th Independent Reserve Air Force Regiment became the 15th Education and Training Aviation Regiment (Polish: 15. Szkolno-Treningowy Pułk Lotniczy) and the 17th Liaison Aviation Regiment became the 17th Mixed Aviation Regiment. At this same time, a few training units were created that prepared the officers to replace the veterans of World War II: the 16th Independent Company of Preparations and Education (Polish: 16. Samodzielna Kompania Szkolno-Przygotowawcza) subordinated to the new Pilot's Officer's Air Force School (detached from the Officer's Air Force School), the 17th Independent Company of Preparations and Education subordinated to the other branch of the former Officer's Air Force School: Technician's Air Force School, the 2nd Independent Technical Airfield Company Polish: 2. Samodzielna Kompania Techniczno-Lotnicza subordinated to the 483rd Airfield Service Battalion and the 2nd Independent Technical Airfield Company subordinated to the 513th Airfield Service Battalion.

Up to 25 September 1945, the following units were disbanded: the 4th Independent Liaison Aviation Squadron, the 5th Independent Liaison Aviation Squadron, the 1131st Company of Anti-Aircraft Machine Guns, the 5th Independent Photographic Company, the Section of Liaison Aviation of the 1st Armoured Corps, the 7th Field Laundry and the 7th Household Storage. Some units changed names: the 4th Pomeranian Mixed Air Force Division to the 1st Pomeranian Mixed Air Force Division, the 15th Education and Training Aviation Regiment to the 1st Education and Training Aviation Regiment, the 17th Mixed Aviation Regiment to the 2nd Mixed Aviation Regiment and the 7th Area of Air Bases to the 1st Area of Air Bases. In all other units, except training ones, the number of troops were decreased.

These were disbanded in October 1945: the 338th Company of Telegraph Builders, the 14th Independent Engineer Airfield Construction Battalion and all the Independent Engineer Airfield Construction Battalions.

These were disbanded in December 1945: the command of the 1st Area of Air Bases (some were subordinated to command units): the 3006th Cereal Storage, the 2003rd Main Air Force Field Storage and the 7th Field Military Household Storage (Polish: 7. Polowy Magazyn Wojskowo-gospodarczy). Also, the names of some units were changed: the 73rd Airfield Service Battalion became the 1st Airfield Service Battalion, the 74th Airfield Service Battalion became the 2nd Airfield Service Battalion, and following this rule: 129th Airfield Service Battalion was renamed as the 3rd Battalion, 130th as the 4th, the 483rd as the 5th, the 495th as the 6th, the 513th as the 7th and the 686th as the 8th. Also the 103rd Independent Liaison Aviation Squadron was renamed as the 9th Independent Liaison Aviation Squadron that was subordinated to the Internal Security Corps. On 6 December 1945 all units of the Civilian Air Fleet were transferred from the Ministry of Defence to the Ministry of Communication as LOT Polish Airlines.

In January 1946 the next restructurisation in the chain of command was started. All commands of divisions were disbanded, and all regiments were directly subordinated to the command of the Air Force of the Polish Army. Also disbanded were: the 4th Bomb Regiment, the 5th Bomb Regiment, the 7th Ground-Attack Regiment, the 8th Ground-Attack Regiment, the 2nd Mixed Aviation Regiment, the 9th Fighter Regiment and some other units of backup. Some regiments changed names: the 2nd Ground-Attack Reg. "Kraków" to the 4th Ground-Attack Reg. "Kraków", the 3rd Ground-Attack Regiment to the 5th Ground-Attack Regiment, the 10th Fighter Regiment to the 2nd Fighter Regiment, the 11th Fighter Regiment to the 3rd Fighter Regiment and the 3rd Bomb Regiment to the 7th Bomb Regiment. Also the 1st Education and Training Aviation Regiment was decreased to a Squadron.

In May and June 1946 military education was reformed. Military Pilots of the Polish Army School in Dęblin was renamed as the Polish Air Force Academy, while a few schools of junior specialists, the 16th and 17th Independent Companies of Preparations and Education were replaced by the Independent Educational Company of Junior Aviation Specialists (Polish: Samodzielna Szkolna Kompania Młodszych Specjalistów Lotniczych). Also one new unit was created: the Section of Liaison Aviation of Command of Polish Army. This unit had to secure communication between the command of the army and commands of military districts.

In December 1946 the 1st, 2nd, 3rd, 4th, 5th, 6th and 7th Airfield Service Battalions were disbanded. At this same time the Temporary Storage of Preservation and Conservation of Reserve Aircraft (Polish: Tymczasowy Magazyn Przechowywania i Konserwacji Samolotów Rezerwowych) was created.

In 1947 some storage was closed: the Storage of Airfield Equipment and Building Materials, the Storage of Fuel and Greases, 2nd Air Force Repair Workshops of type "C" and Guarding Company of Central Air Force Storage.

In 1946 the last Poles that were educated in Aviation Schools in the Soviet Union returned to Poland. Others rejoining the service between 1945 and 1947 included 205 pre-war officers and non-commissioned officers that returned from POW camps, and disbanded units of Polish Air Forces in Great Britain including such famous pilots like Maj. Stanisław Skalski.

On March 13, 1947, the Air Force of the Polish Army was renamed as the Polish Air Force (Polish: Wojska Lotnicze), ending its transformation to a peacetime Air Force.

Despite reorganisation, some units (the 2nd Independent Mixed Air Force Regiment, 9th Independent Liaison Aviation Squadron, aviation sections of military districts and partially, units of the Air Force Academy) were used against Polish anti-communist guerillas and the Ukrainian Insurgent Army, up to 14 November 1947. Mainly Po-2 aircraft were used in those fights, in reconnaissance, liaison, propaganda and sometimes in ground-attack missions. Il-2's were also used in a few fights. Units of the Air Force of the Polish Army were also used in propaganda actions before the 1946 Polish people's referendum.

== Organisation at the end of the war ==
- Command of the Air Force of the Polish Army (Dowództwo Lotnictwa Wojska Polskiego)
  - 1st Mixed Air Force Corps (1. Mieszany Korpus Lotniczy)
    - 1st Bomb Division (1. Dywizja Lotnictwa Bombowego)
      - 3rd Bomb Regiment (3. Pułk Lotnictwa Bombowego)
      - 4th Bomb Regiment (4. Pułk Lotnictwa Bombowego)
      - 5th Bomb Regiment (5. Pułk Lotnictwa Bombowego)
    - 2nd Brandenburg Ground-Attack Division (2. Brandenburska Dywizja Lotnictwa Szturmowego)
      - 6th Ground-Attack Regiment (6. Pułk Lotnictwa Szturmowego)
      - 7th Ground-Attack Regiment (7. Pułk Lotnictwa Szturmowego)
      - 8th Ground-Attack Regiment (8. Pułk Lotnictwa Szturmowego)
    - 3rd Brandenburg Fighter Division (3. Brandenburska Dywizja Lotnictwa Myśliwskiego)
      - 9th Fighter Regiment (9. Pułk Lotnictwa Myśliwskiego)
      - 10th Fighter Regiment (10. Pułk Lotnictwa Myśliwskiego)
      - 11th Fighter Regiment (11. Pułk Lotnictwa Myśliwskiego)
  - 4th Pomeranian Mixed Air Force Division (4. Pomorska Mieszana Dywizja Lotnicza)
    - 1st Fighter Regiment "Warszawa" (1. Pułk Lotnictwa Myśliwskiego "Warszawa")
    - 2nd Bomb Regiment (2. Pułk Lotnictwa Bombowego "Kraków")
    - 3rd Ground-Attack Regiment (3. Pułk Lotnictwa Szturmowego)
  - 7th Area of Air Bases (7. Rejon Baz Lotniczych)
    - 7th Communication Company (7. Kompania Łączności)
    - 7th Technic and Technical Operationality Company (7. Kompania Techniczno-Eksploatacyjna)
    - 107th Wheel Transport Battalion (107. Batalion Transportu Samochopdowego)
    - 901st Company of Anti-Aircraft Machine Guns (901. Kompania Przeciwlotniczych Karabinów Maszynowych)
    - 2003rd Air Force Field Storage (2003. Polowy Magazyn Lotniczy)
    - 7th Household Storage (7. Skład Gospodarczy)
    - 95th Field Office of the Polish National Bank (95. Polowa Kasa Narodowego Banku Polskiego)
    - 23rd Independent Station of Oxygen Supply (23. Samodzielne Stanowisko Dostarczania Tlenu)
    - 73rd Airfield Service Battalion (73. Batalion Obsługi Lotnisk)
    - 74th Airfield Service Battalion (74. Batalion Obsługi Lotnisk)
    - 129th Airfield Service Battalion (129. Batalion Obsługi Lotnisk)
    - 130th Airfield Service Battalion (130. Batalion Obsługi Lotnisk)
    - 483rd Airfield Service Battalion (483. Batalion Obsługi Lotnisk)
    - 495th Airfield Service Battalion (495. Batalion Obsługi Lotnisk)
    - 513rd Airfield Service Battalion (513. Batalion Obsługi Lotnisk)
    - 686th Airfield Service Battalion (686. Batalion Obsługi Lotnisk)
  - 2nd Saxonian Independent Headquarters Squadron (2. Saksońska Samodzielna Eskadra Sztabowa)
  - 6th Independent Transport Aviation Squadron (6. Samodzielna Eskadra Lotnictwa Transportowego)
  - 12th Medical Aviation Regiment (12. Pułk Lotnictwa Sanitarnego)
  - 13th Transport Aviation Regiment (13. Pułk Lotnictwa Transportowego)
  - 14th Independent Air Reconnaissance and Correction of Artillery Fire Regiment (14. Samodzielny Pułk Rozpoznania Lotniczego i Korygowania Ogniem Artylerii)
  - 17th Liaison Aviation Regiment (17. Pułk Lotnictwa Łącznikowego)
  - 6th Independent Regiment of Communication (6. Samodzielny Pułk Łączności)
  - 1596th Regiment of Air Defence (1596. Pułk Obrony Przeciwlotniczej)
  - 1st Independent Engineer Airfield Construction Battalion (1. Samodzielny Inżynieryjny Batalion Budowy Lotnisk)
  - 2nd Independent Engineer Airfield Construction Battalion (2. Samodzielny Inżynieryjny Batalion Budowy Lotnisk)
  - 14th Independent Engineer Airfield Construction Battalion (14. Samodzielny Inżynieryjny Batalion Budowy Lotnisk)
  - 1763rd Air Force Hospital (1763. Szpital Lotniczy)
  - Officer's Air Force School (Oficerska Szkoła Lotnicza)
  - 15th Independent Reserve Air Force Regiment (15. Samodzielny Zapasowy Pułk Lotniczy)
  - 27th Technical Air Force Storage (27. Techniczny Skład Lotniczy)
  - 953rd Quartermaster Storage (953. Skład Intendencki)
  - 620th Air Force Ammunition Storage (620. Lotnicze Składy Amunicji)
  - 338th Company of Telegraph Builders (338. Kompania Budowy Telegrafu)
  - 6th Independent Radio Station of Ground Aircraft Service (6. Samodzielna Radiostacja Naziemnej Obsługi Samolotów)
  - 18th Company of Ground Support of Flights (18. Kompania Ziemnego Zabezpieczenia Lotów)
  - 5th Independent Camouflage Platoon (5. Samodzielny Pluton Maskowania)
  - 5th Independent Photographic Company (5. Samodzielna Kompania Aerofoto)
  - 22nd Company for Special Missions (22. Kompania do Zadań Specjalnych)
  - 6th Aircraft Minor Repairs Workshops (6. Warsztaty Napraw Samolotów)
  - 131st Aircraft Repair Workshops (131. Warsztaty Remontowe Samolotów)
  - 54th Mobile Repair Base (54. Ruchoma Baza Remontowa)
  - 17th Field Repair Workshops (17. Polowe Warsztaty Remontowe)
  - 192nd Field Repair Workshops (192. Polowe Warsztaty Remontowe)
  - 193rd Field Repair Workshops (193. Polowe Warsztaty Remontowe)
  - 817th Field Repair Workshops (817. Polowe Warsztaty Remontowe)

Units detached for cooperation with other commands:

- Cooperating with the Communication Command of the Polish Army:
  - 4th Independent Liaison Aviation Squadron (4. Samodzielna Eskadra Lotnictwa Łącznikowego)
  - 5th Independent Liaison Aviation Squadron (5. Samodzielna Eskadra Lotnictwa Łącznikowego)
- Cooperating with the 1st Polish Army
  - 103rd Independent Liaison Aviation Squadron (103. Samodzielna Eskadra Lotnictwa Łącznikowego)
- Cooperating with the 2nd Polish Army
  - 3rd Independent Liaison Aviation Squadron (3. Samodzielna Eskadra Lotnictwa Łącznikowego)
- Section of Liaison Aviation of the Armoured Force Command of the Polish Army (klucz łącznikowy przy dowództwie wojsk pancernych WP)
- Section of Liaison Aviation of the 1st Armoured Corps (klucz łącznikowy przy 1. Korpusie Pancernym)

Civil Aviation subordinated to PAF Command:

- 18th Regiment of Civil Aviation Fleet (18. Pułk Lotnictwa Cywilnej Floty Powietrznej)
- 19th Regiment of Civil Aviation Fleet (19. Pułk Lotnictwa Cywilnej Floty Powietrznej)
- 7th Independent Squadron of Civil Aviation Fleet (7. Samodzielna Eskadra Lotnictwa Cywilnej Floty Powietrznej)
- 8th Independent Squadron of Civil Aviation Fleet (8. Samodzielna Eskadra Lotnictwa Cywilnej Floty Powietrznej)
- 13 civilian airports

== Aircraft (data as of 1 June 1945) ==
Aircraft	Origin	Type	Versions	In service	Notes
Polikarpov Po-2	Soviet Union	Liaison/Night Bomber		197	215 at the end of May 1945
Ilyushin Il-2	Soviet Union	Ground-Attack; Training	Il-2M/Il-2m3; UIl-2	142; 19	158 at the end of May 1945
Yakovlev Yak-1	Soviet Union	Fighter		18	29 at the end of May 1945
Yakovlev Yak-3	Soviet Union	Fighter		14	
Yakovlev Yak-7	Soviet Union	Trainer / Fighter	Yak-7B, Yak-7W	Yak-7B as trainer, Yak-7W as trainer and Liaison. Operated from September 1943 to September 1946.	
Yakovlev Yak-9	Soviet Union	Fighter	Yak-9M; Yak-9T; Yak-9U	119	130 at the end of May 1945
Petlyakov Pe-2	Soviet Union	Dive Bomber		100	107 at the end of May 1945
Yakovlev UT-2	Soviet Union	Training		39	
Lisunov Li-2	Soviet Union	Transport/Passenger		6	
Bell P-39 Airacobra	United States	Fighter		1 and more(?)	One operated as personal aircraft of General Fyodor Polynin, Commander of the Polish Air Force
Republic P-47 Thunderbolt	United States	Fighter		7–9	
other				32	

On 1 June 1945 16,288 troops were serving in the People's Air Force, including 3,381 commissioned officers, and 902 civil workers. In addition, 1893 soldiers including 417 commissioned officers served in the Civil Aviation Fleet, subordinated to the Air Force.

== See also ==
- Polish Air Forces in France and Great Britain
