= History of the Polish Air Force =

The Polish Air Force, the aerial warfare branch of the Polish Armed Forces, traces its origins to the second half of 1917 and was officially established in the months following the end of World War I in 1918.

== 1918–1922 ==
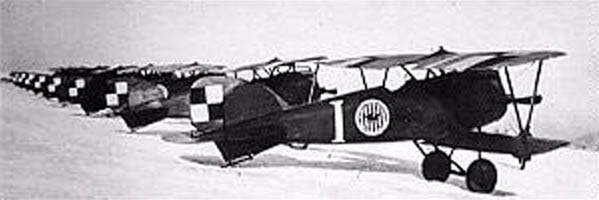
Albatros D.III (Oef) fighters of the Polish 7th Air Escadrille at Lewandówka airfield in the winter of 1919–1920

The history of the Polish airforce began at the end of World War I. In 1918, some aircraft escadres were created within the Polish units in allied countries. In Russia, one escadre was created within the Polish I Corps of General Józef Dowbor-Muśnicki, then disbanded along with the Corps in May 1918. In France, seven escadres were created within the army of General Józef Haller (three Breguet XIV: nos. 39, 59, 66, three Salmson 2: nos 580, 581, 582 and one Spad VII no.162). They returned to Poland, equipment intact, in May 1919.

Military aviation in free Poland started even before officially acknowledged date of regaining independence (11 November 1918). Poland was under German and Austro-Hungarian occupation until the armistice, but the Poles started to take control as the Central Powers collapsed. Initially, Polish air force consisted of mostly German and Austrian aircraft left by former occupants or captured from them, mostly during the Greater Poland Uprising. They were first used in a conflict with Ukraine around Lwów (now Lviv) in late 1918. On 2 November Polish units took over an airfield Lewandówka in Lviv, and on 5 November 1918 pilot Stefan Bastyr performed the first combat flight of Polish aircraft (Oeffag C.II). Other actions included the retaliatory bombing of an airfield in Frankfurt (Oder) on 9 January 1919 by LVG C.V aircraft during the Greater Poland Uprising.

From early 1919 Poland was involved in the war with Soviet Russia and started to buy aircraft abroad, both from former Central Powers and allied countries. By mid 1920 there were created 15 scout and 4 fighter squadrons (eskadra in Polish, Nos. 1 to 19) and one bomber squadron (No. 21 destroyer squadron). They were actively used during Polish–Soviet War until a ceasefire in October 1920. Air combat was rare and most of Polish Air Force activity was reconnaissance, light bombing and strafing, especially against Budyonny's cavalry. In that period, the Polish Air Force consisted of a variety of British, French, German, Austrian and Italian aircraft of World War I era. A bulk were reconnaissance and light bomber aircraft; most numerous were: Breguet 14 (158 in total), LVG C.V (151), Bristol F.2 Fighter (106), AEG C.IV (91), SVA.10 (86), Rumpler C.I (84), DFW C.V (63), Salmson 2 (53). In lesser numbers there were used, among others, DH-9, Albatros aircraft (C.I C.VII, C.X, J.I), Hannover CL.II, Hansa-Brandenburg C.I, Halberstadt CL.II Main fighters used were: Fokker D.VII, SPAD VII, SPAD XIII, Oeffag D.III, Ansaldo Balilla, Albatros D.III, Sopwith Dolphin, Fokker E.V (D.VIII).

== 1923–1932 ==
Air Force checkerboard 1918–93

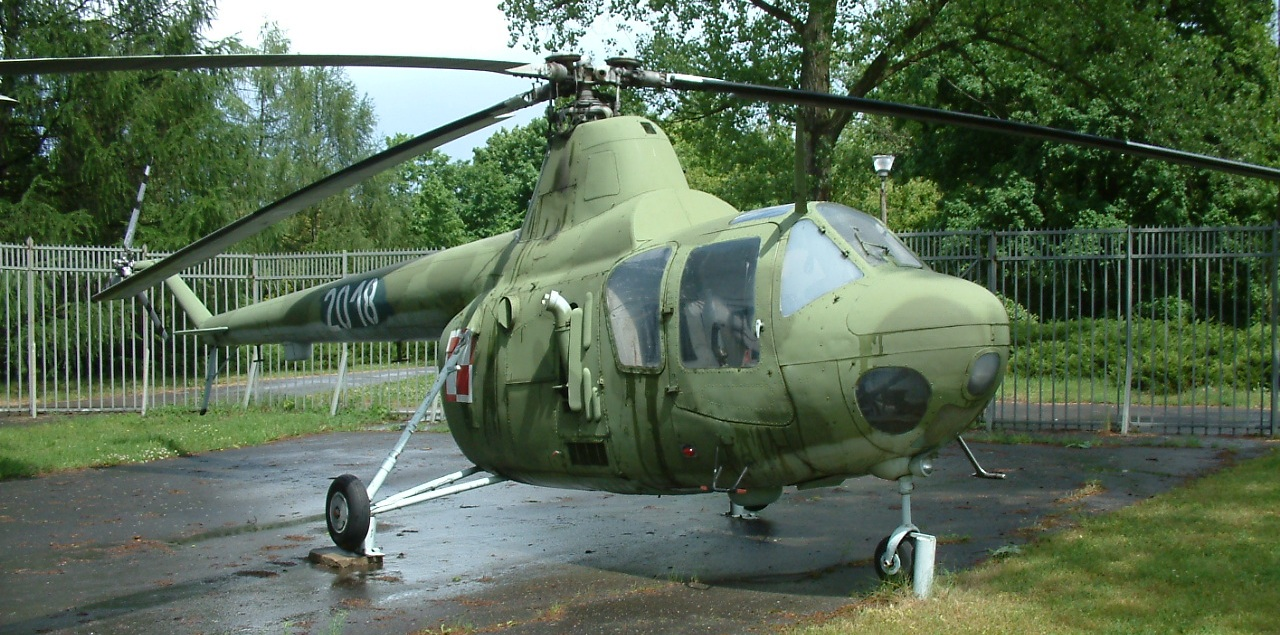
SM-1

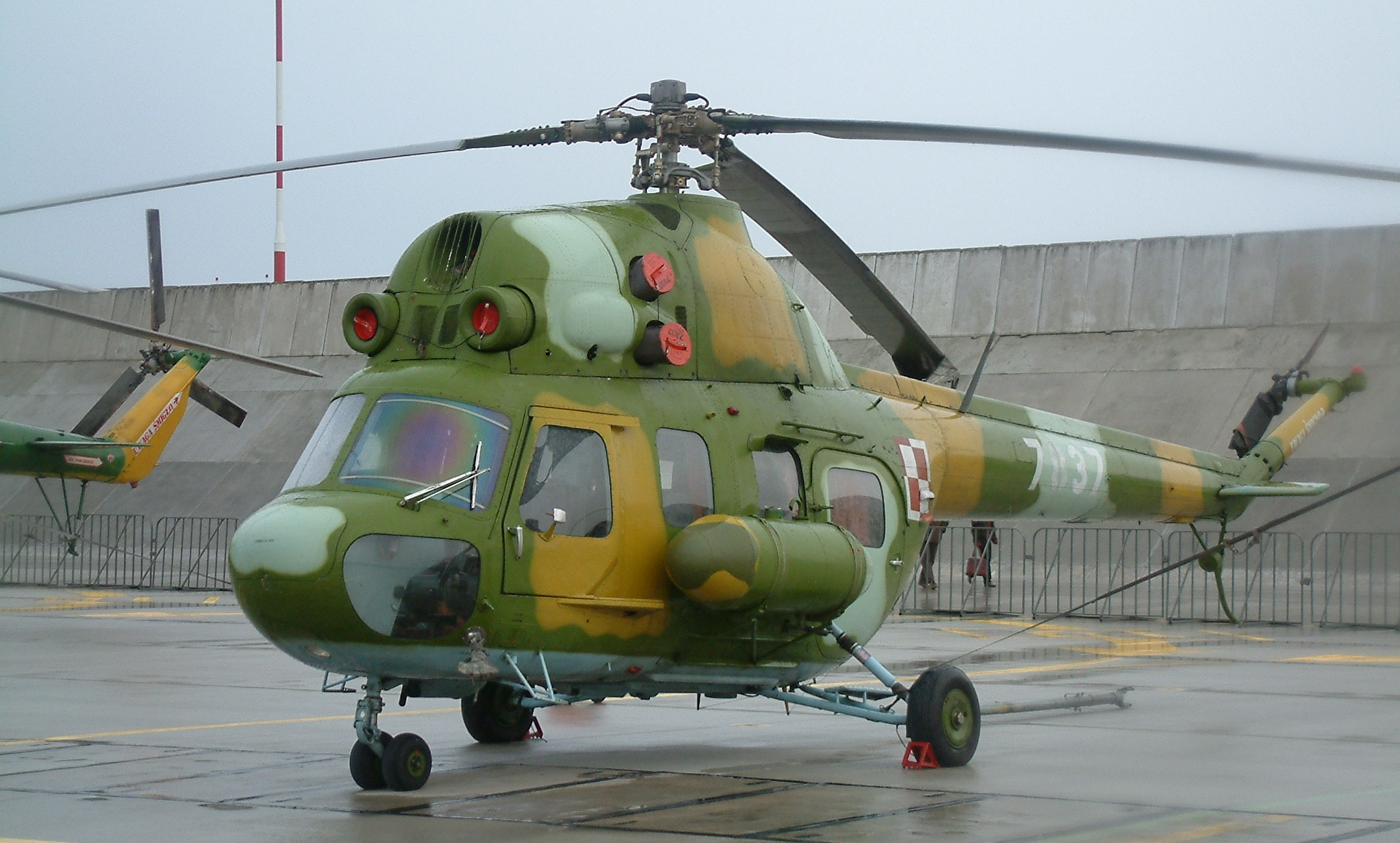
Mil Mi-2

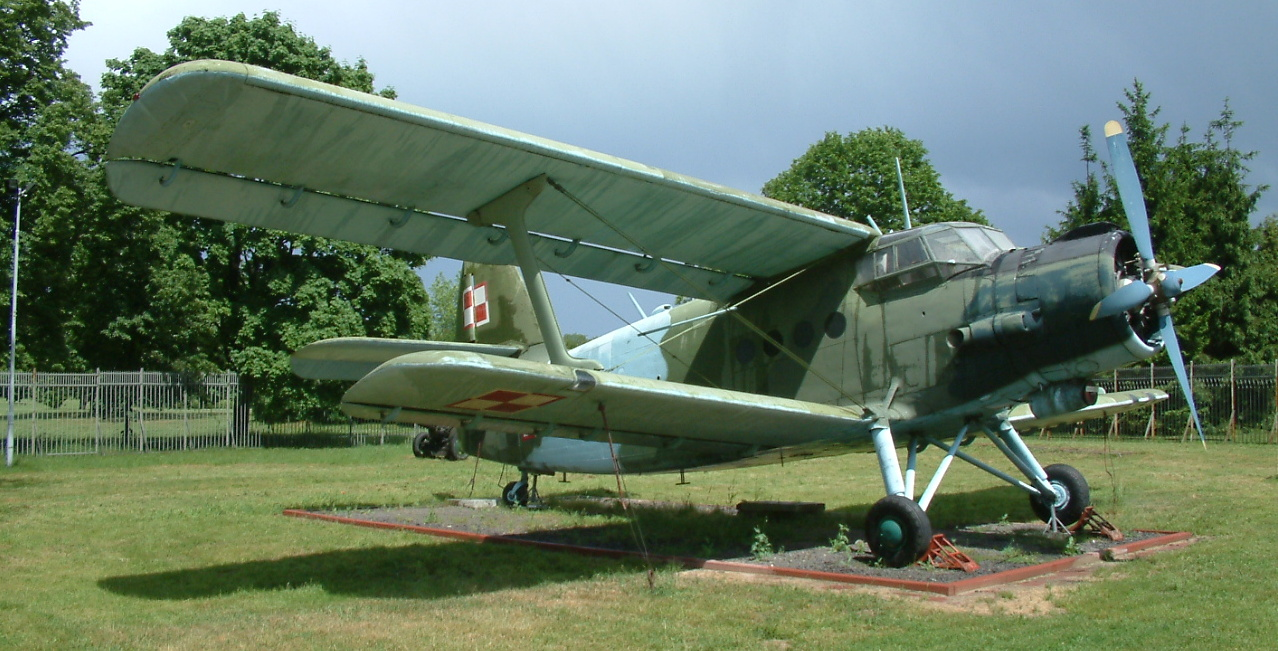
Antonov An-2

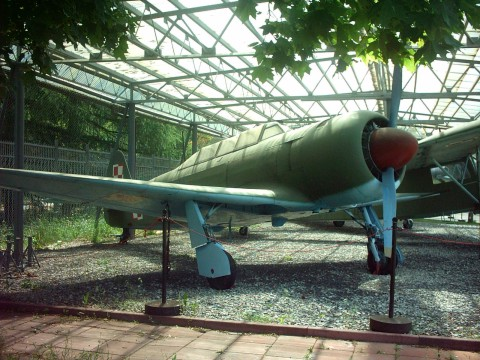
Yakovlev Yak-11

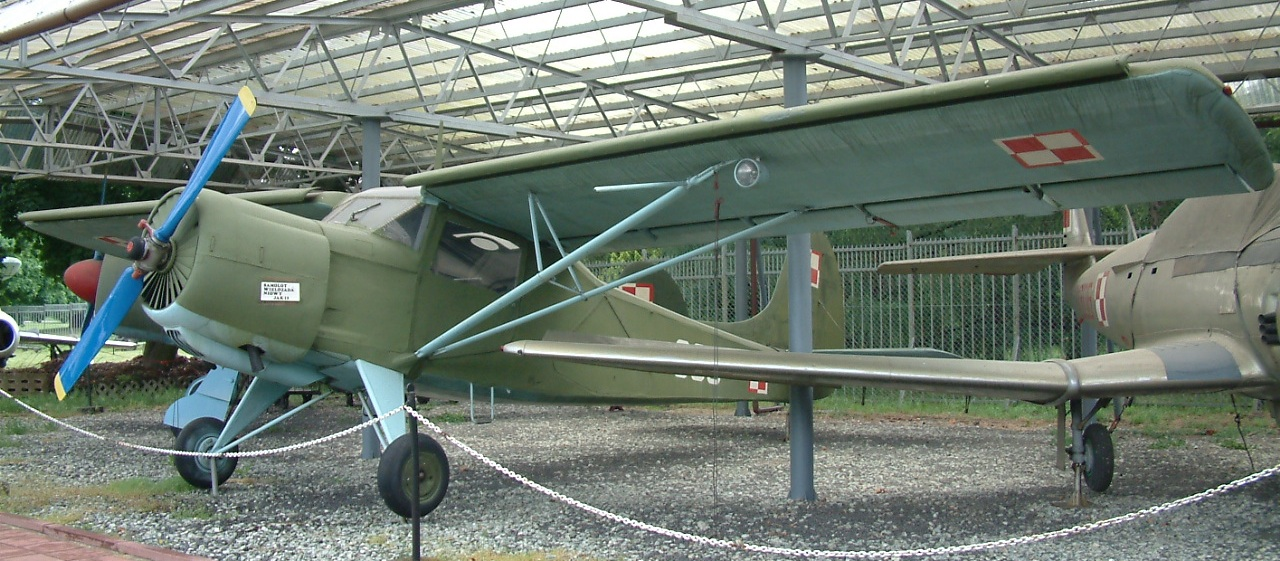
Yakovlev Yak-12

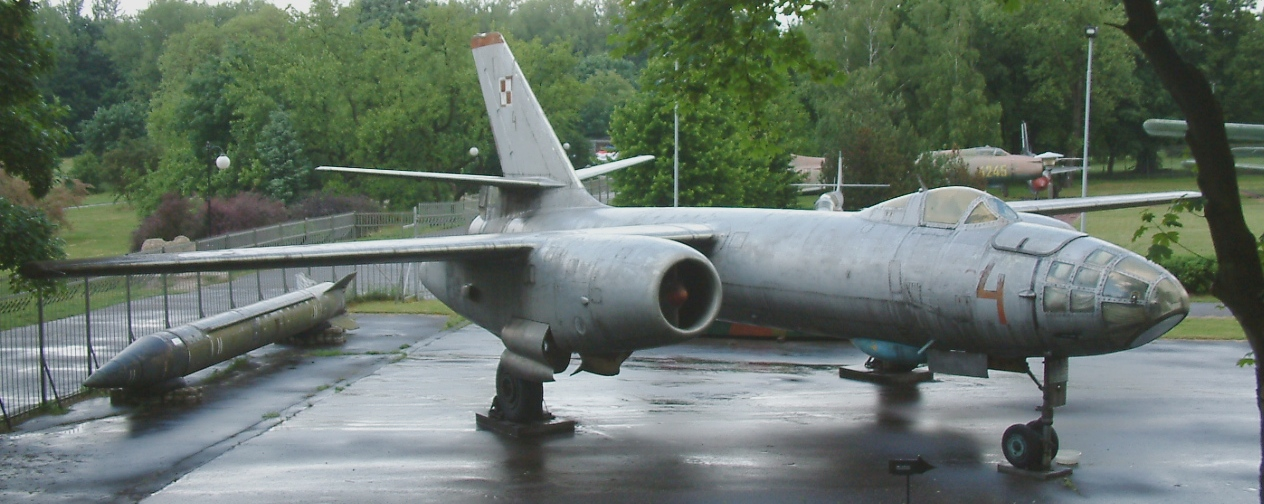
Ilyushin Il-28

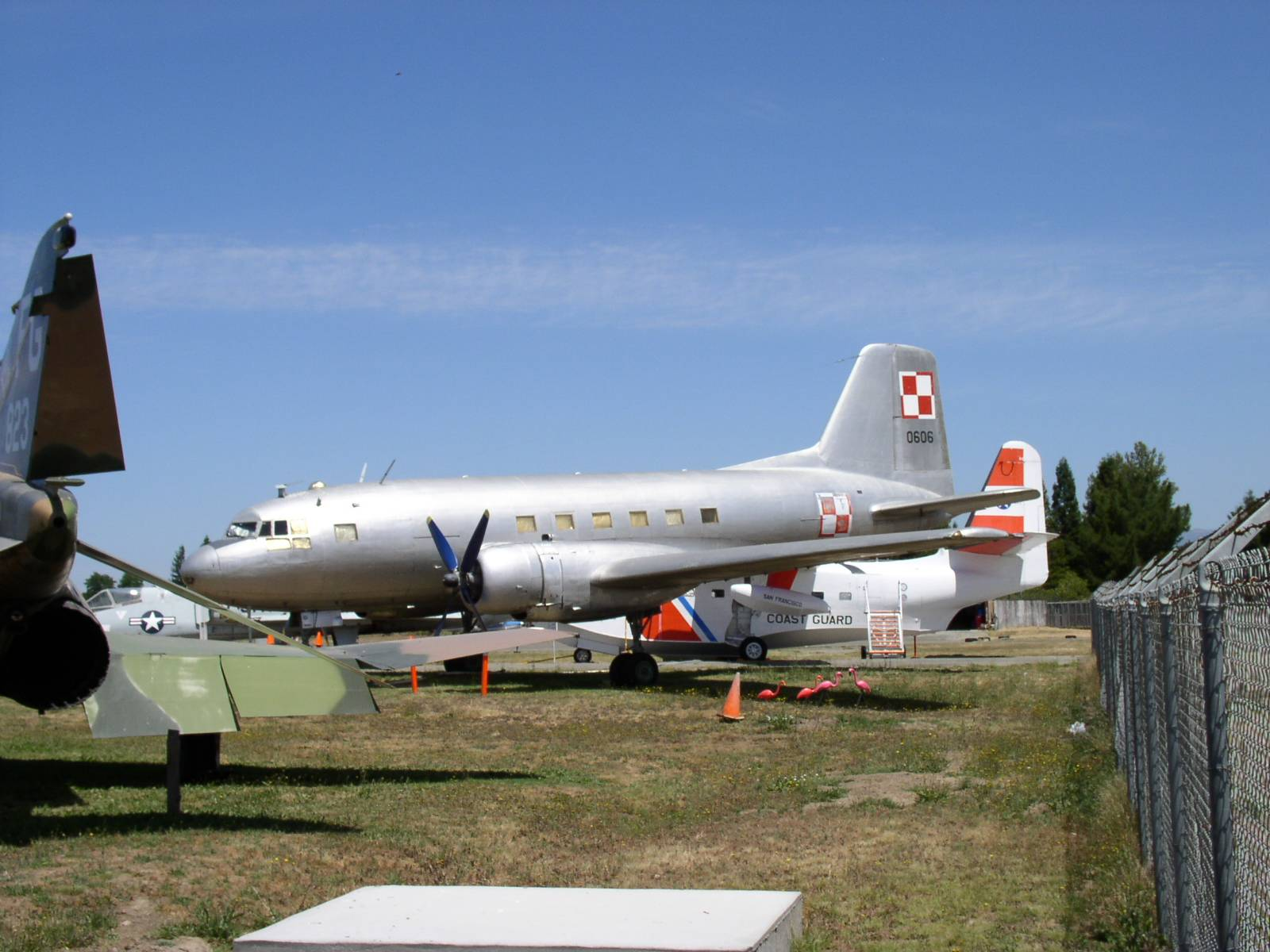
Ilyushin Il-14

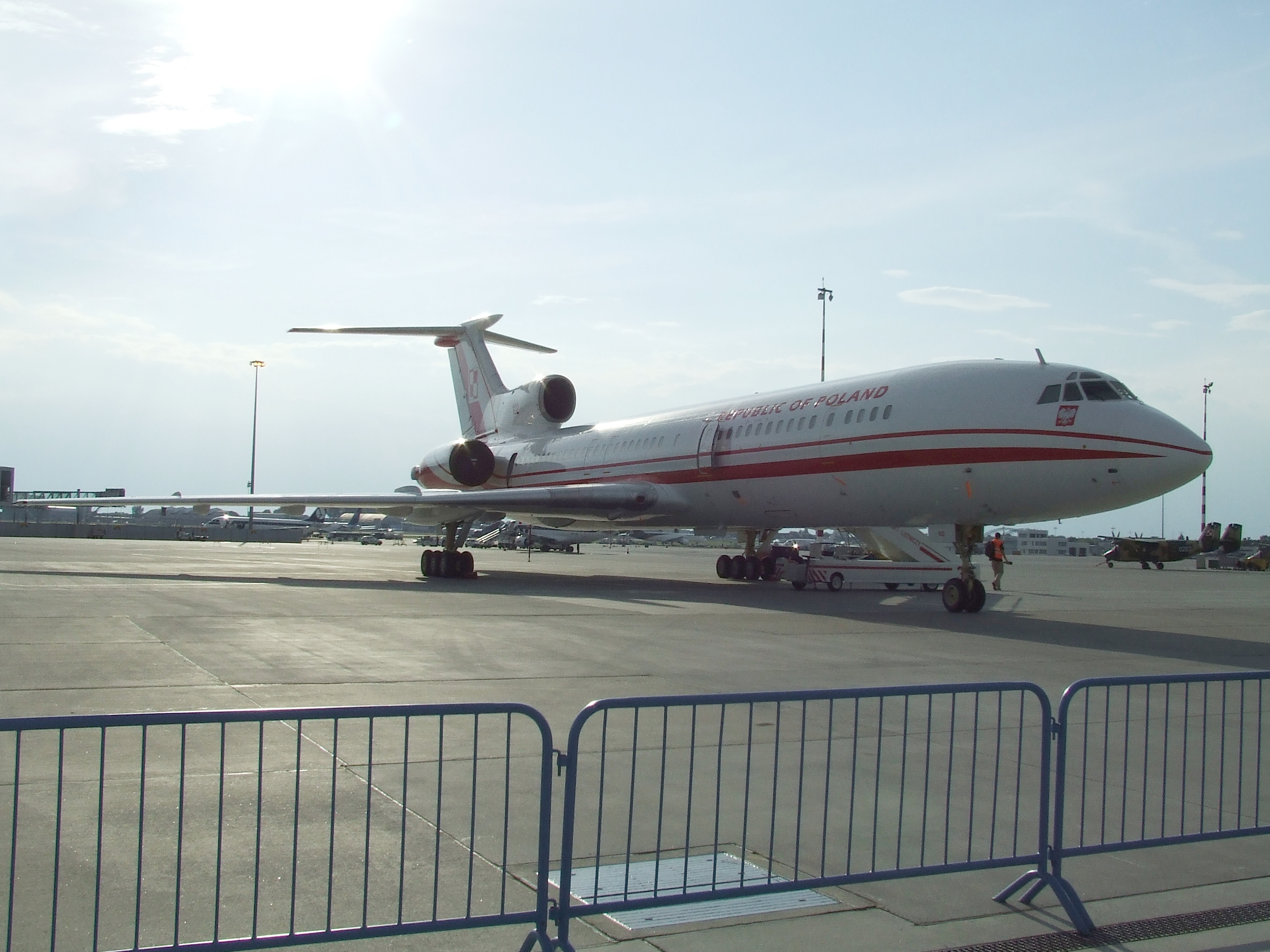
Tupolev Tu-154M Lux

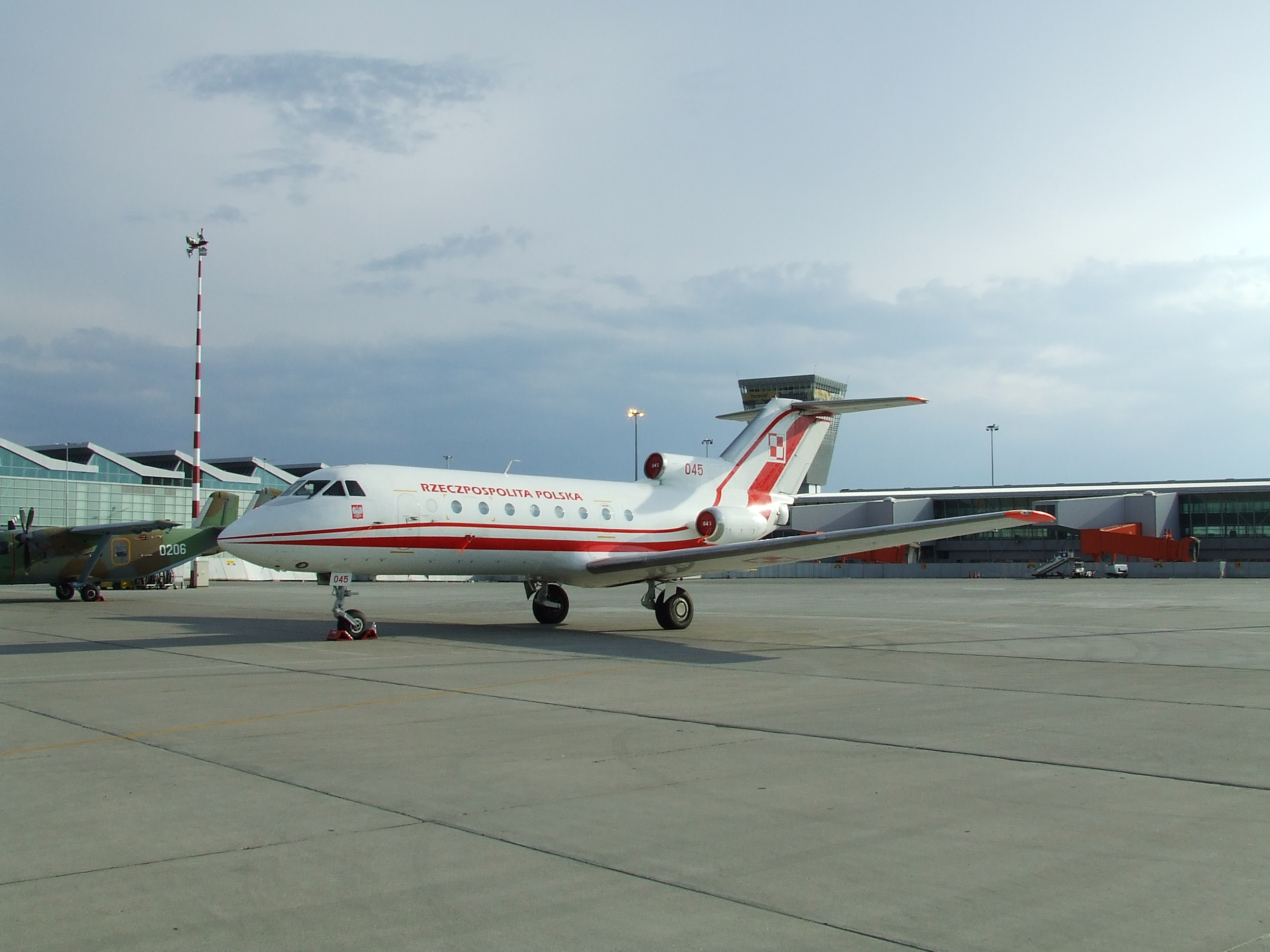
Yakovlev Yak-40

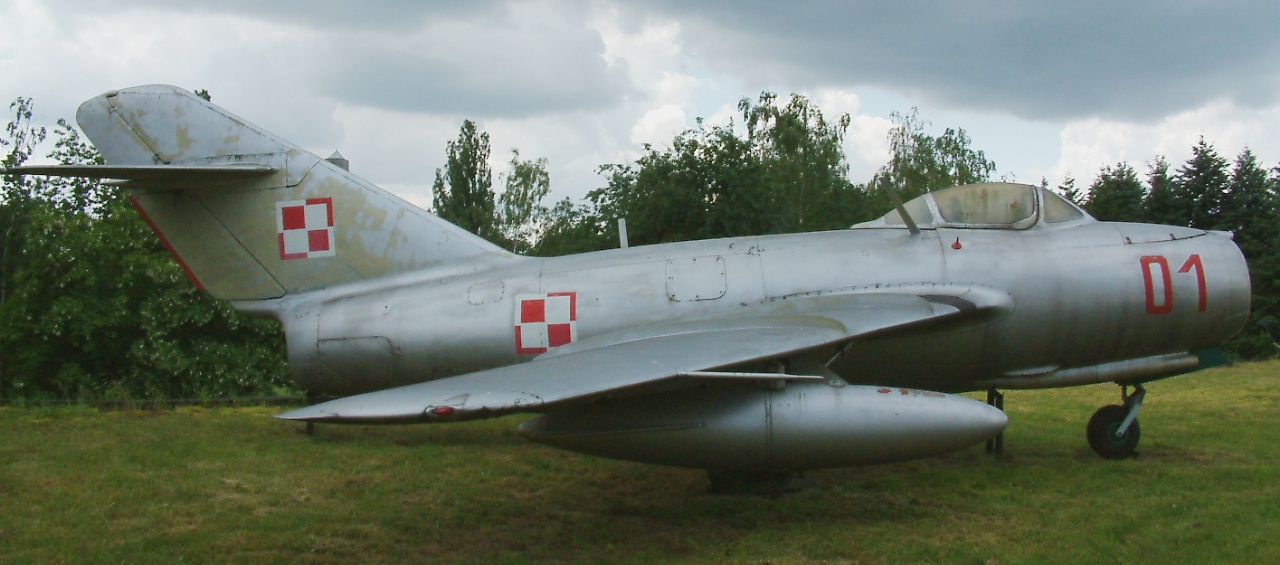
Mikoyan-Gurevich MiG-15

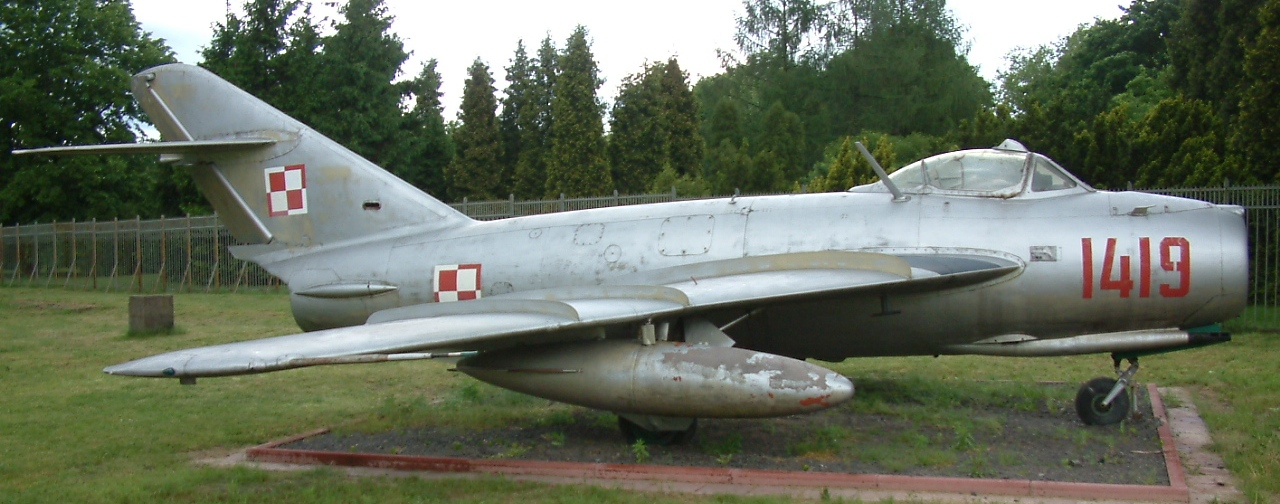
Lim-5 (license-built MiG-17)

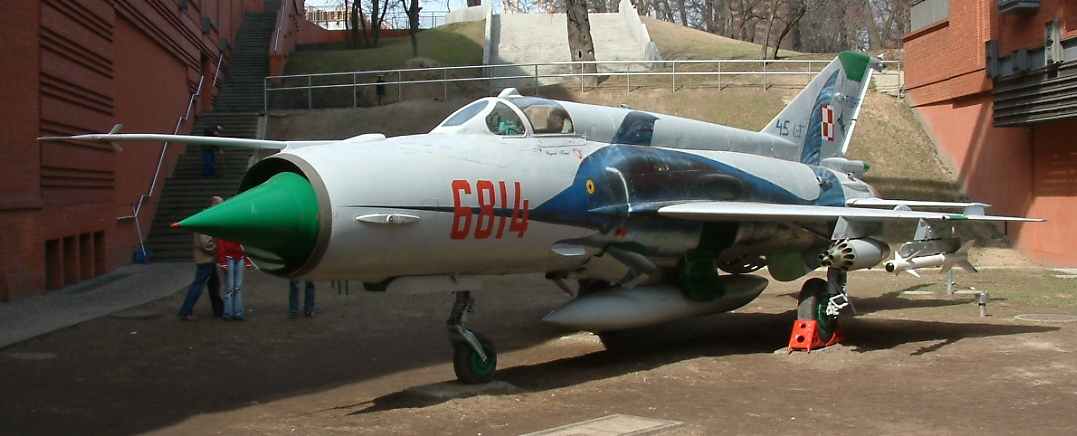
Mikoyan-Gurevich MiG-21

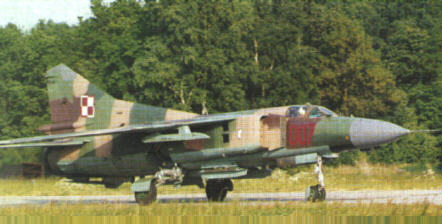
Mikoyan-Gurevich MiG-23

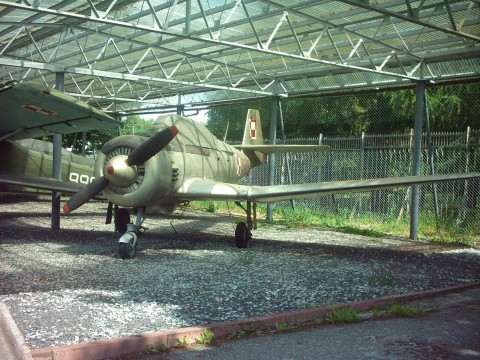
TS-8 Bies

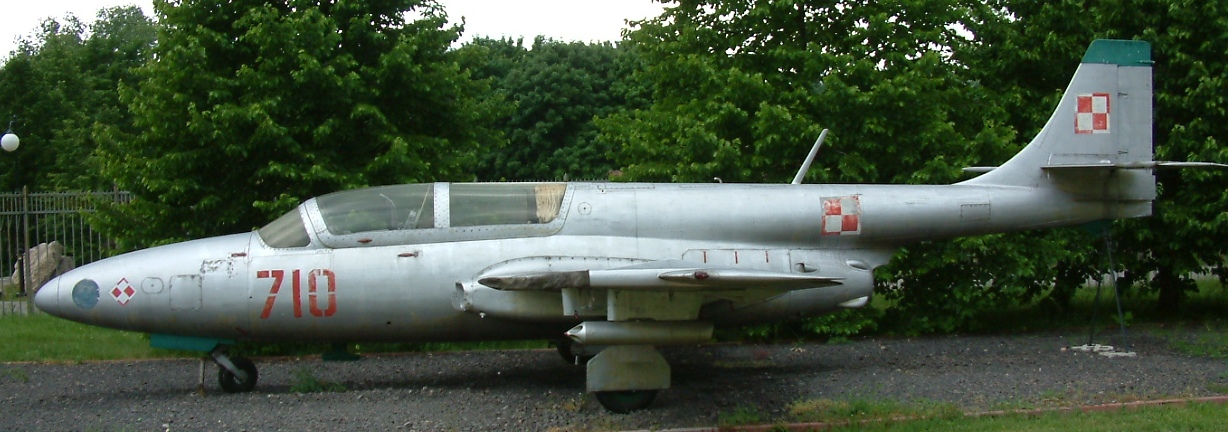
TS-11 Iskra

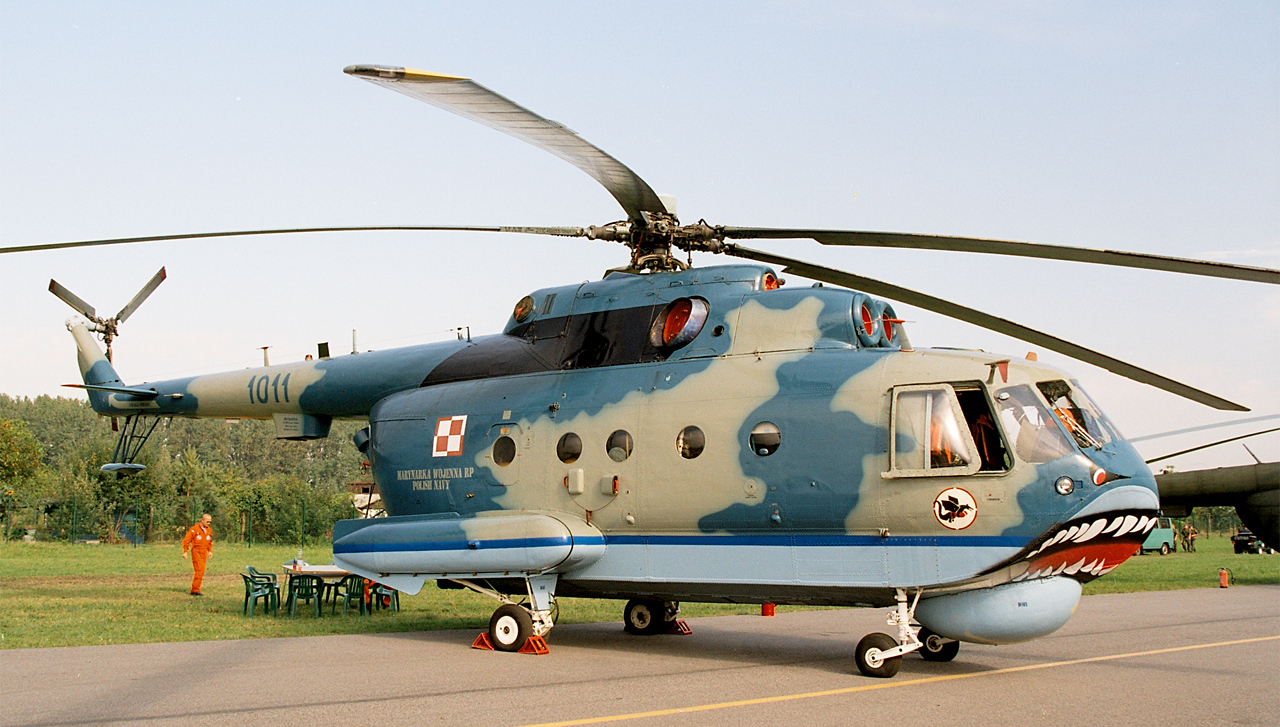
Mil Mi-14

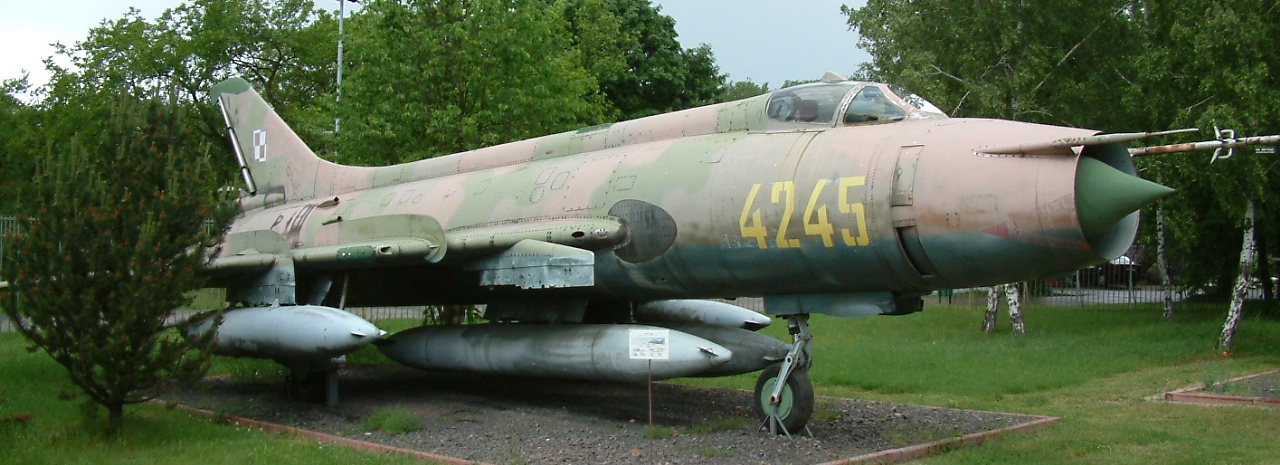
Sukhoi Su-20

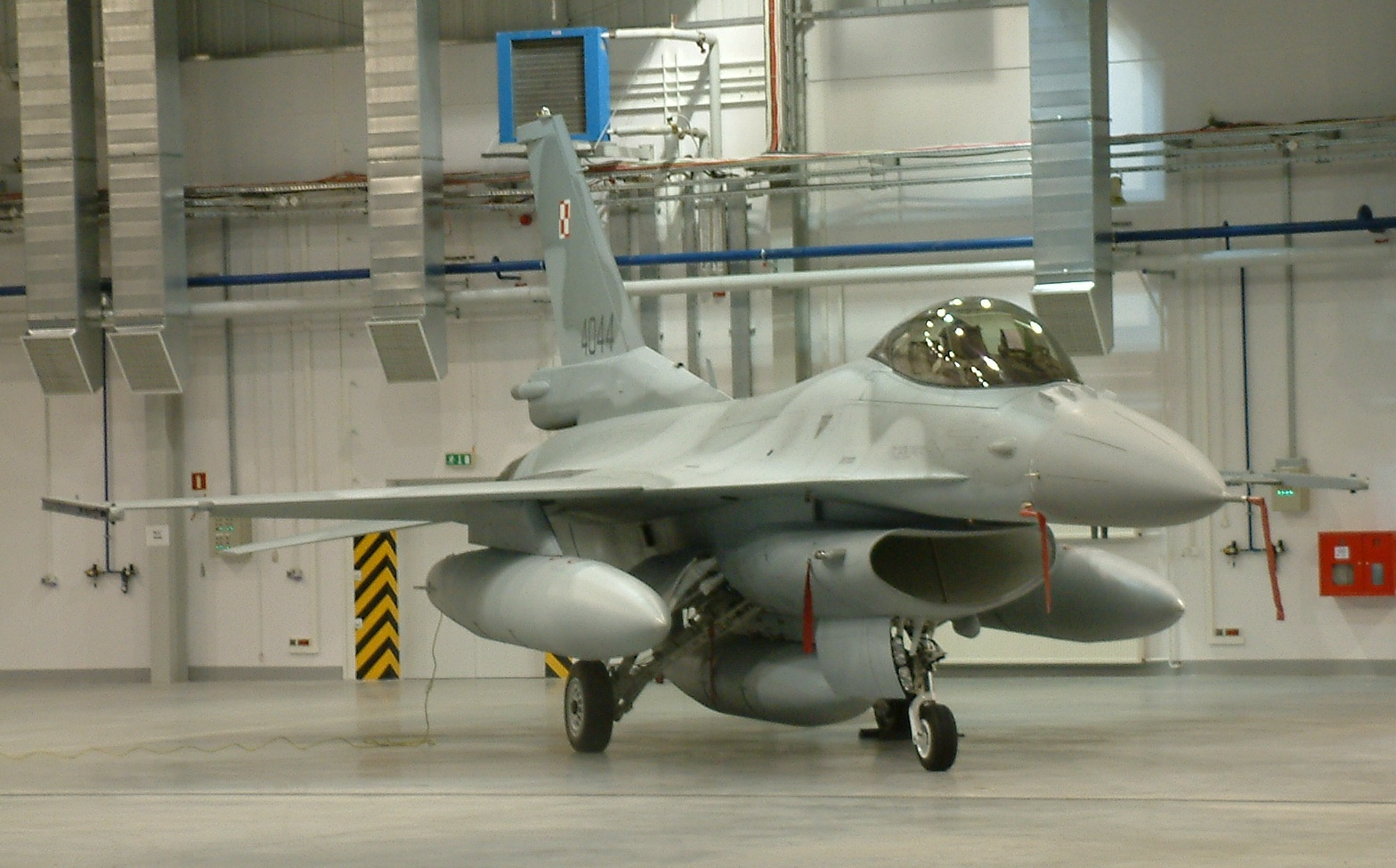
F-16

|-

After the Polish–Soviet War, the World War I vintage aircraft were gradually withdrawn, and the airforce was equipped mostly with French aircraft. From 1924–26, the typical fighter became SPAD 61 (280 planes). The standard light bombers also were French: Potez 15 (245), then Breguet XIX (250) and Potez 25 (316). Potez bombers were produced in Poland. The medium bombers were Farman Goliath and later a military variant of Fokker F-VII.

Before developing fighters of its own design, 50 Czech biplane fighters Avia BH-33 were licence-produced under a designation PWS-A. The first Polish design was a high-wing fighter, PWS-10, which numbered 80 from 1932. The Polish naval airforce used a number of French flying boats, mainly Schreck FBA 17, Lioré et Olivier LeO H-13 and its variant H-135 and Latham 43. All these aircraft were withdrawn from combat units by 1939.

== 1933–1938 ==
In 1933, the first high-wing, all-metal aircraft designed by Zygmunt Pulawski, the PZL P.7a, entered service in a series of 150. It was followed by 30 improved PZL P.11a aircraft. The final design, PZL P.11c, was delivered in 1935 in a quantity of 175. A modern fighter in 1935, it remained the only Polish fighter until 1939, when it was rendered obsolete by foreign aircraft design. Its development PZL P.24 was built for export only, and was bought by four countries. The new fighter prototype, PZL.50 Jastrząb (Hawk), similar to Seversky P-35 layout, was designed too late to be produced. The two-engine heavy fighters PZL.38 Wilk and PZL.48 Lampart remained prototypes.

As far as bombers are concerned, the Potez 25 and Breguet 19 were replaced by an all-metal monoplane, the PZL.23 Karaś (250 built, after 1936), but even by 1939 the Karas was outdated. In 1938 the Polish factory PZL designed a modern twin-engine medium bomber PZL.37 Łoś (Elk), arguably the best bomber in the world when it entered service that year. The Los had a bomb payload of 2580 kg and a top speed of 439 km/h. Unfortunately, too few entered service before the war (approximately 30 Los A bombers (single-fin tail) and 70 Los B (twin-fin) bombers were delivered before the war started). As an observation and close reconnaissance plane, Polish escadres used slow and easily damaged Lublin R-XIII, then RWD-14 Czapla. Polish naval aviation used Lublin R-XIII on floats. Just before the war, some Italian torpedo planes CANT Z.506 were ordered, but only one was delivered, without armament. The main trainer plane was the Polish-built high-wing RWD-8 (primary) and biplane PWS-26 (trainer). In 1939, Poland ordered 160 of MS-406 and 10 Hawker Hurricane fighters abroad, but they were not delivered before the outbreak of war.

== 1939 ==
Number of planes on September 1, 1939 Source: Polish Chief of Staff, Wacław Stachiewicz quotes the following numbers in his memoirs (Wacław Stachiewicz (1998). Wierności dochować żołnierskiej. OW RYTM. ISBN 83-86678-71-2.)
Type	Model	Total	Incl. in combat formations
Fighters	PZL P.11	175	140
Fighters	PZL P.7	105	30
Line planes light bombers/tactical bombers	PZL.23A	35	0
Line planes light bombers/tactical bombers	PZL.23B	170	120
Bomber planes medium bombers	PZL.37 Łoś	61	36
Bomber planes medium bombers	PZL.30 Żubr	15	0
Associate planes Surveillance aircraft and Army cooperation plane	Lublin R-XIII	150	55
Associate planes Surveillance aircraft and Army cooperation plane	RWD-14 Czapla	60	40
Total		771	421

At the beginning of the Invasion of Poland, by 1 September 1939, all the Polish combat aircraft had been deployed to the field; contrary to a common belief based on German propaganda, they avoided destruction in bombed air bases. The German bombers managed to destroy mostly trainer planes on the airfields. The fighter planes were grouped in 15 escadres (five of them constituted the Pursuit Brigade, deployed in Warsaw area). Despite being obsolete, Polish PZL-11 fighters shot down over 170 German planes. The bombers, grouped in nine escadres of the Bomber Brigade, attacked armoured columns, suffering heavy losses. Seven reconnaissance and 12 observation escadres, deployed to particular armies, were used primarily for reconnaissance. Most of the Polish airforce was destroyed in the campaign, and the rest of the aircraft were captured or withdrawn to Romania. Subsequently, the Romanians employed the remaining aircraft for their own use. A great number of pilots and air crews managed to escape to France.

== 1940 (France) ==
After the fall of Poland, the Polish airforce started to regroup in France. The only complete unit created before the German attack on France was the GC 1/145 fighter squadron, flying on Caudron C.714 light fighters (it was the only unit operating C.714). The Polish pilots were also deployed to various French squadrons, flying on all types of French fighters, but mainly on MS-406.

== 1940–1947 (United Kingdom) ==
Following France's surrender in 1940, Polish units were formed in the United Kingdom, as a part of the Royal Air Force, and known as the Polish Air Force (PAF). The first squadrons were: No. 300 Polish Bomber Squadron and 301 bomber squadrons and 302 and 303 fighter squadrons. The fighter squadrons, flying the Hawker Hurricane, first saw action in the third phase of the Battle of Britain in August 1940, with very good results. Polish flying skills were well developed from the Invasion of Poland and the pilots were regarded as fearless and sometimes bordered on reckless. Nevertheless, success rates were very high in comparison to UK and Empire pilots. 303 squadron became the most efficient RAF fighter unit at that time. Many Polish pilots also flew in other RAF squadrons.

In the following years, further Polish squadrons were created: 304 (bomber, then Coastal Command), 305 (bomber), 306 (fighter), 307 (night fighter), 308 (fighter), 309 (reconnaissance, then fighter), 315 (fighter), 316 (fighter), 317 (fighter), 318 (fighter-reconnaissance) and No. 663 (air observation/artillery spotting). The fighter squadrons initially flew Hurricanes, then Supermarine Spitfires, and eventually on P-51 Mustangs. Night fighters used by 307 were the Boulton-Paul Defiant, Bristol Beaufighter and finally the de Havilland Mosquito. The bomber squadrons were initially equipped with Fairey Battles and Vickers Wellingtons, then Avro Lancasters (300 Sqdn.), Handley Page Halifaxs and Consolidated B-24 Liberators (301 sqn) and de Havilland Mosquitos and B-25 Mitchells (305 Sqdn.). 663 Squadron flew Auster AOP IIIs and Vs. After the war, with the changed international situation, their equipment was returned to the British but only some of the pilots and crews returned to Poland.

== 1943–1989 ==
Along with the Polish People's Army (Ludowe Wojsko Polskie) in the USSR, the Ludowe Lotnictwo Polskie — Polish People's Airforce — was created. In late 1943, the 1st fighter regiment "Warszawa", (flying on Yak-1 and Yak-9), the 2nd night bomber regiment "Kraków" (Polikarpov Po-2 (from 1949 also produced in Poland as CSS-13), and the 3rd assault regiment (Ilyushin Il-2) were formed. In 1944–45, further regiments were created forming the 1st Mixed Air Corps, consisting of a Bomber Division, Assault Division, Fighter Division and a mixed Division. Among these units was the Polish 9th Fighter Regiment. After the war, these returned to Poland and gave birth to the air force of the Polish People's Republic.

Starting in 1950, Poland received Petlyakov Pe-2 and Tupolev Tu-2 bombers from the USSR and USB-1 and USB-2 training bombers. In 1949 the Li-2sb transport adapted to bombing came into service. In 1950 the Yak-17 fighter, Il-12 transport, Yak-18 trainer and UTB-2 bomber trainer arrived. From 1951, the Polish Air Force was equipped with jet fighters in the shape of Yak-23 and MiG-15 (along with a training version, the MiG-15UTI) and later the (MiG-17) in 1961).

As well as Soviet produced aircraft, the MiG-15 was produced under licence in Poland as Lim-1 (starting in 1952), the MiG-15bis (from 1953) and as Lim-2 (since 1957), MiG-17 (from 1955) as Lim-5. A domestic ground attack variant of Lim-5M was developed as Lim-6bis (1964).

The only jet bomber used was the Ilyushin Il-28, from 1952. Poland used only a small number of MiG-19 from 1959, because the basic supersonic fighter from 1963 became MiG-21. This aircraft was used in numerous variants from MiG-21F-13, through MiG-21PF and MF to MiG-21bis. Later, the Polish Air Force received 37 MiG-23 (1979) and 12 MiG-29 (1989). The main attack plane after 1949 was Il-10 (since 1951 also training version UIl-10). Starting 1964 Poland also used a substantial number of attack planes Su-7B (since 1965), replaced with 27 Sukhoi Su-20 (since 1974) and 110 Sukhoi Su-22 (1984) as the main attack planes.

The only jet trainer was the domestically built TS-11 Iskra, which replaced proper engine Junak-2 (in service 1952), TS-9 Junak-3 (in service since 1954) and PZL TS-8 Bies (since 1958). The other Polish jet trainer, the PZL I-22 Iryda, was used for some time but because of continuing problems all machines were returned to PZL for modification and it is currently not in service. As multirole planes Yak-12 (since 1951), An-2 (since 1955) and Wilga-35 P were used. Transport aircraft were: Il-14 (since 1955), Il-18 (since 1961), An-12B (since 1966), An-26 (since 1972), Yak-40 (since 1973) and Tupolev Tu-154.

Helicopters used by Polish Army were: SM-1 (under licence of Mil Mi-1) — multirole (since 1956), Mil Mi-4 — multirole (since 1958), SM-2 — multirole (since 1960), Mil Mi-2 and Mil Mi-8 (later also Mil Mi-17) (since 1968) — multirole and Mil Mi-24 (since 1976) — combat helicopter. Also the Mil Mi-14 as amphibious helicopter are used, and Mil Mi-6 as transports.

In 1954, the Air Force was merged with Air Defence Force, creating Air and Country Air Defence Forces (Wojska Lotnicze i Obrony Przeciwlotniczej Obszaru Kraju — WLiOPL OK). It was formed from both flying and anti-aircraft units. In 1962 WLiOPL OK were separated again into: the Air Force (Wojska Lotnicze) and the Country Air Defence Force (Wojska Obrony Powietrznej Kraju). On July 1, 1990, they were merged again in the Air and Air Defence Force (Wojska Lotnicze i Obrony Powietrznej — WLiOP or WLOP).

== Since 1990 ==
After the fall of the iron curtain in 1989 and an arms reduction in Europe, the Polish airforce was reduced. In 1990 it consisted of MiG-21s, MiG-23s, MiG-29s, Su-20s and Su-22s. The rest of Lim-6bis were withdrawn in the early 1990s, followed soon by Su-20. MiG-23s were withdrawn by 1999 due to their small number. Throughout the 1990s, Poland has not purchased any new combat planes, and only managed to acquire further MiG-29s from Czech Republic (1995) and Germany (2004). MiG-21s were finally withdrawn in 2003. In 2004, the only combat aircraft were the MiG-29 and Su-22. The fleet of Su-22's needs modernization to retain a combat value, but its future is unclear. In 2003, the F-16C Block 52 was chosen as a new multi-role fighter, the first deliveries took place in November 2006 and will continue until 2008 under Operation Peace Sky. It is expected that the Polish Air Force will form three squadrons of F-16's which will be fully operational by 2012.

By choosing the F-16, Poland will be able to derive advantages from the JSF programme, which come from its internationality and long-term economic cooperation of many countries.

"Acquiring the F-16C/D fighter will make it easier for Poland to transition into the new generation Joint Strike Fighter aircraft (F-35 Lightning II), which will be the most technologically advanced multirole fighter. The Polish Air Force, equipped with the F-16C/D and the F-35 by the year 2020, will become one of the most modern air forces in the world. By sustaining advantages from the military tactics training offered by the US Air Force, the Polish Air Force can modernize and will be able to drop projectiles on targets with perfect precision. What's more, the Polish JSF programme entry will create the possibility of advantages for Polish industry. The programme will enable Polish industry to take part in the US$400 billion enterprise", said Lieutenant General Tome H. Walters Jr., director of the US Defense Security Cooperation Agency, which job is to sell American military equipment to foreign trade partners.

The acquisition of the F-16 was not without heated competition from European aerospace firms. At one point the Polish Fighter Competition included the Dassault Mirage 2000 and the Saab JAS 39 Gripen. The Polish Block 52+ F-16s are equipped with the latest Pratt and Whitney F-100-229 afterburning turbofan engine, and the avionics suite will be equipped with the APG-68(V)9 terrain mapping radar system and ALQ-211(V)4 electronic warfare suite. All Polish F-16s will be fully equipped to carry the latest in US precision ordnance, ranging from the JDAM/JSOW to the latest in export air-to-air weaponry (including the AIM-120C and AIM-9M 8/9).

It comes as no surprise that the United States came in with the lowest bid as the migration to the F-35 JSF and F/A-22 Raptor is currently ongoing, leaving improved fourth-generation fighters such as the F-16 an attractive and cost-effective option for nations with outmoded hardware looking to upgrade their air force.

== Bibliography ==
- Morgała, Andrzej (1997). Samoloty wojskowe w Polsce 1918-1924 [Military aircraft in Poland 1918–1924] (in Polish). Warsaw: Lampart. ISBN 83-86776-34-X.
- Nelcarz, Bartolomiej & Peczkowski, Robert (2001). White Eagles: The Aircraft, Men and Operations of the Polish Air Force 1918–1939. Ottringham, UK: Hikoki Publications. ISBN 1-902109-73-2.
