= Józef Smaga =

Soviet and Polish aviator (1896–1982)

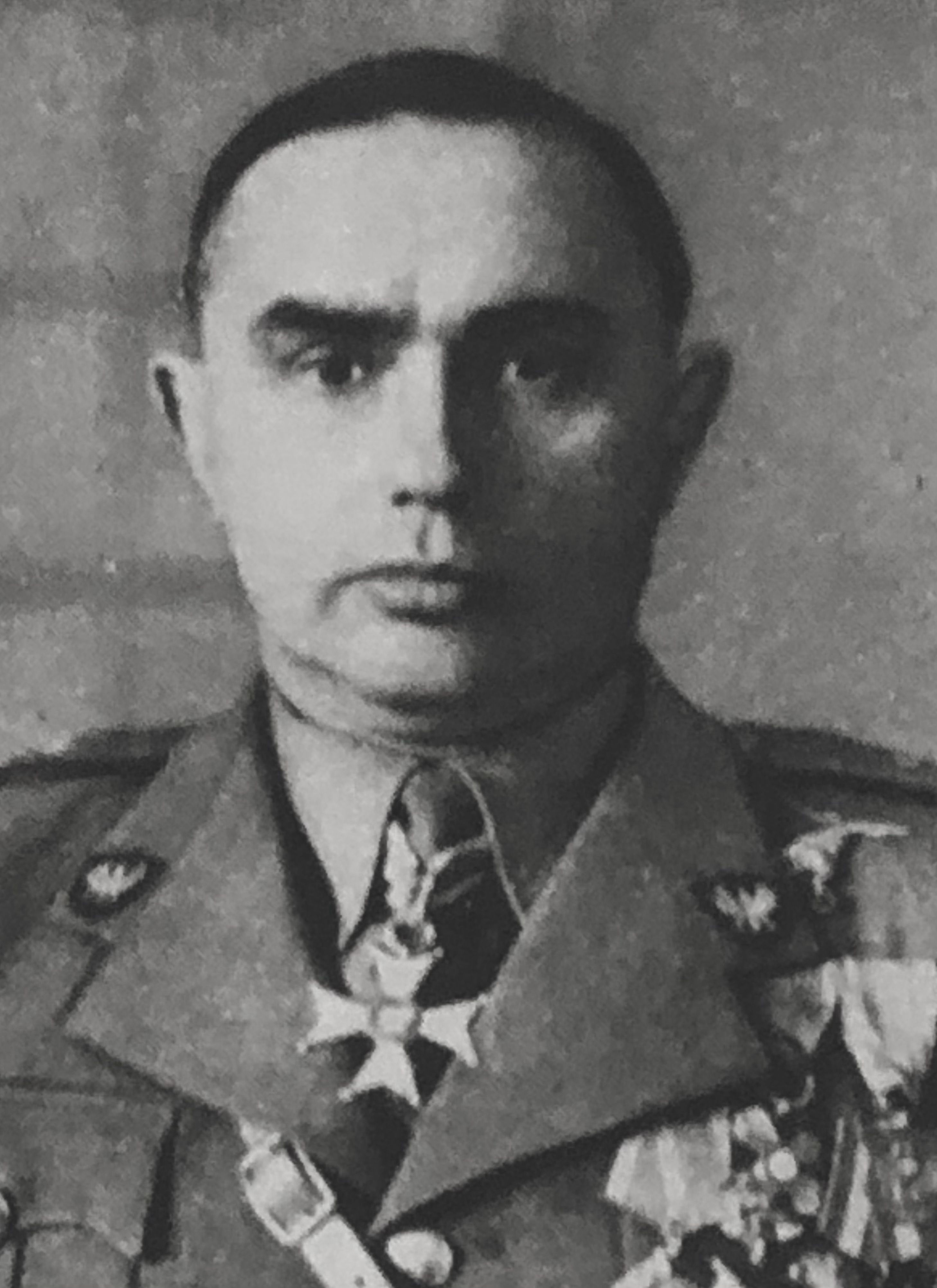
- Born: 2 November 1896; Dąbrówka, Lubartów County, Kingdom of Poland, Russian Empire
- Died: 9 December 1982 (aged 86); Leningrad, Russian SFSR, Soviet Union
- Military career
- Allegiance: Soviet Union; Polish People's Republic
- Branch: Soviet Air Force; Air Force of the Polish Army
- Rank: Major-General (Soviet Union); Brigadier General (Poland)
- Conflicts: Russian Civil War; World War II

Józef Smaga (2 November 1896 – 9 December 1982) was a Soviet and Polish aviator, Major-General and Brigadier General.

== Biography ==
Smaga was born in to a Polish working-class family. At a young age he worked as a locksmith and moved to Petrograd for work. During the First World War, he was evacuated to the east and worked at a factory in Petrograd. For participating in strikes organized by revolutionaries, he was fired from the factory and later drafted into the Russian Imperial Army.

After the February Revolution, he joined the Red Guards, becoming a member of the Bolsheviks and SDKPiL. He took part in the October Revolution in battles in Petrograd, and in February 1918 he took part in the defense of the city.

In 1920, Smaga received a position as an instructor at a flight school in Yegoryevsk. He graduated from the Borisoglebsk Aviation School in 1924, from October 1925 he served in the 8th Aviation Squadron, and from May 1929 he was squadron commander of the 3rd Military School of Pilots and Observer Pilots in Orenburg. In July 1933, he headed the 23rd heavy bomber aviation brigade in Monino, in 1935-1936 he was a student at the Red Army Air Force Academy (graduated from the operational department), later deputy commander of the 1st aviation brigade at the Stalin Naval Aviation School the command staff of the Black Sea Fleet and head of the university department of the Red Army Air Force Directorate.

On June 23, 1938, Smaga was arrested during the Great Purge, but was released and reinstated in service in August 1940, becoming deputy commander of an aviation brigade in the North Caucasus Military District. Since May 1941, regiment commander of the Bataysk Aviation Pilot School named after A.K. Serov.

On the Eastern Front from 1941, he took part in battles against the Germans in 1942–1943. In April 1944, he was sent to the Polish Armed Forces with the rank of colonel and commanded the 2nd night bomber aviation regiment "Krakow", and on July 30, 1944, he was appointed acting. O. commander of the 1st Polish aviation division, and since August 31, commander of this division. He led operations in the Warecko-Magnushevsky direction and in the vicinity of Warsaw. On November 11, 1944, he was promoted to brigade general by decision of the State Council, and later, by a resolution of the Council of People's Commissars of the USSR, he was awarded the military rank of major general of aviation. From December 27, 1944, commander of the United Aviation School in Zamosc and from April 13, 1945, and commander of the Dęblin Military Aviation School. In May 1946, he was sent into retirement by order of Marshal Michał Rola-Żymierski. In July of the same year he returned to the Soviet Union and retired in 1948.

== Awards ==
- Order of Lenin (1945)
- Order of the Red Banner (1944, twice)
- Order of the Red Star
- Order of Polonia Restituta, 3rd class (1945)
- Order of the Cross of Grunwald, III degree (May 11, 1945)
- Golden Cross of Merit (1946)
- Medal For Warsaw 1939–1945
