= 6th Air Army =

The 6th Air Army was an air army of the Red Army's Air Force during the Second World War and from 1946-1949. It was formed twice : in 1942 as part of the Red Army's Air Forces, and redesignated in 1944, and in 1946 and redesignated in 1949.

The 6th Air Army was first formed on 14 June 1942 from the Air Forces of the North-Western Front, and its first commander was Major General of Aviation Daniil Kondratyuk, who held command to January 1943. On 1 July 1942 the army included the 239th and 240th Fighter Aviation Divisions, 241st Bomber Aviation Division, 242nd Night Bomber Aviation Division, 243rd Assault Aviation Division, 514th and 645th Light Bomber Aviation Regiments, 642nd, 644th, 649th, and 677th Composite Aviation Regiments (сап), 699th Transport Aviation Regiment, and the 6th Reconnaissance Aviation Squadron.

During its World War II service, the 6th Air Army included for a time the 588th Night Bomber Regiment, the all-female 'Night Witches'. It was assigned initially to the North-Western Front until February 1944, and after that to the 1st and 2nd Belorussian Fronts. In the summer and early fall of 1944, the army provided air support for Operation Bagration, the Soviet recapture of Belarus and eastern Poland, and the Lublin–Brest Offensive, which brought the Red Army to the Vistula. On 8 September, the army was withdrawn to the Reserve of the Supreme High Command. During the war, the army's units flew more than 120,000 sorties. On 31 October 1944, the army headquarters was transformed into the headquarters of the Air Force of the Polish Army.

In 1946, the 6th Air Army was reformed in Alma Ata to provide air support for the Turkestan Military District, under the command of Lieutenant General of Aviation Vladimir Izotov. In September 1947, Lieutenant General Mikhail Kosykh took command of the army. The 6th Air Army was redesignated the 73rd Air Army on 10 January 1949.

Among the Army's units in the 1980s was the 9th Guards Fighter Aviation Regiment.

After being renamed the Air Forces of the Central Asian Military District from 1980 to 1988, 73rd Air Army was disbanded in 1993.

== Army Commanders during World War II ==
- Major General of Aviation Daniil Kondratyuk (June 1942 - January 1943);
- Major General of Aviation, from May 1943 Lieutenant General of Aviation Fyodor Polynin (January 1943 - October 1944).
