= Fyodor Polynin =

Soviet Colonel general

- Фёдор Петрович Полынин
- Born: 20 October [O.S. October 7] 1906; Sukhoy Otrog village, Nikolayevsky Uyezd, Samara Governorate, Russian Empire
- Died: 21 November 1981 (aged 75); Moscow, Russian SFSR, Soviet Union
- Military career
- Allegiance: Soviet Union; Polish People's Republic
- Branch: Soviet Air Forces; Polish Air Force
- Service years: 1928–1971
- Rank: Colonel general (USSR); Lieutenant general (Poland)
- Conflicts: Second Sino-Japanese War; World War II; Winter War; Eastern Front
- Awards: Hero of the Soviet Union

Fyodor Petrovich Polynin (Russian: Фёдор Петрович Полынин; 20 October 1906 – 21 November 1981) was a Colonel general in the Soviet Air Forces, who served in the Air Force of the Polish Army during World War II and received the title Hero of the Soviet Union.

== Early life ==
Polynin was born on October 20, 1906, in the village of Sukhoy otrog, located in the present-day Saratov Oblast. He came from a large peasant family and was one of 11 children. In 1907, he and his family moved to Siberia, to the village of Samarka at the Semipalatinsk region, where his father worked at a medium-sized farm.

At the age of 8, he started working on his father's farm. After his father's death, he left for Kuybyshev in August 1924 and started working in the Union of Rural Cooperatives as a watchman and porter and from April 1927 as an unqualified worker in a sausage factory. At the same time, in the years between 1925 and 1928, he attended the evening secondary school for adults in Kuybyshev.

== Military career ==
He joined the Red Army in October 1928. Polynin served as a cadet in the regimental school of the 101st Infantry Regiment, but in December 1928 he was transferred to the Red Army Air Forces. He graduated from the Joint School of Pilots and Aviation Technicians in Volsk in 1929. In 1931, he graduated from the 3rd Military School of Pilots and Aviation Technicians in Orenburg.

=== War in China ===
From June 1931, he served in the aviation brigade of the Air Force Academy of the Red Army named after I. Zhukovsky. Till 1933, he served as an instructor and flight commander. Polynin engaged in his first air combat missions from November 1933 to October 1934, while serving as a military advisor to Chinese Nationalist Air Force pilots. During this time, Polynin flew combat missions on board a Polikarpov R-5 to attack East Turkestan independence movement rebels who threatened to overthrow the Military Governor of Xinjiang Sheng Shicai, and successfully repelled the rebels attempt to take over Ürümqi.

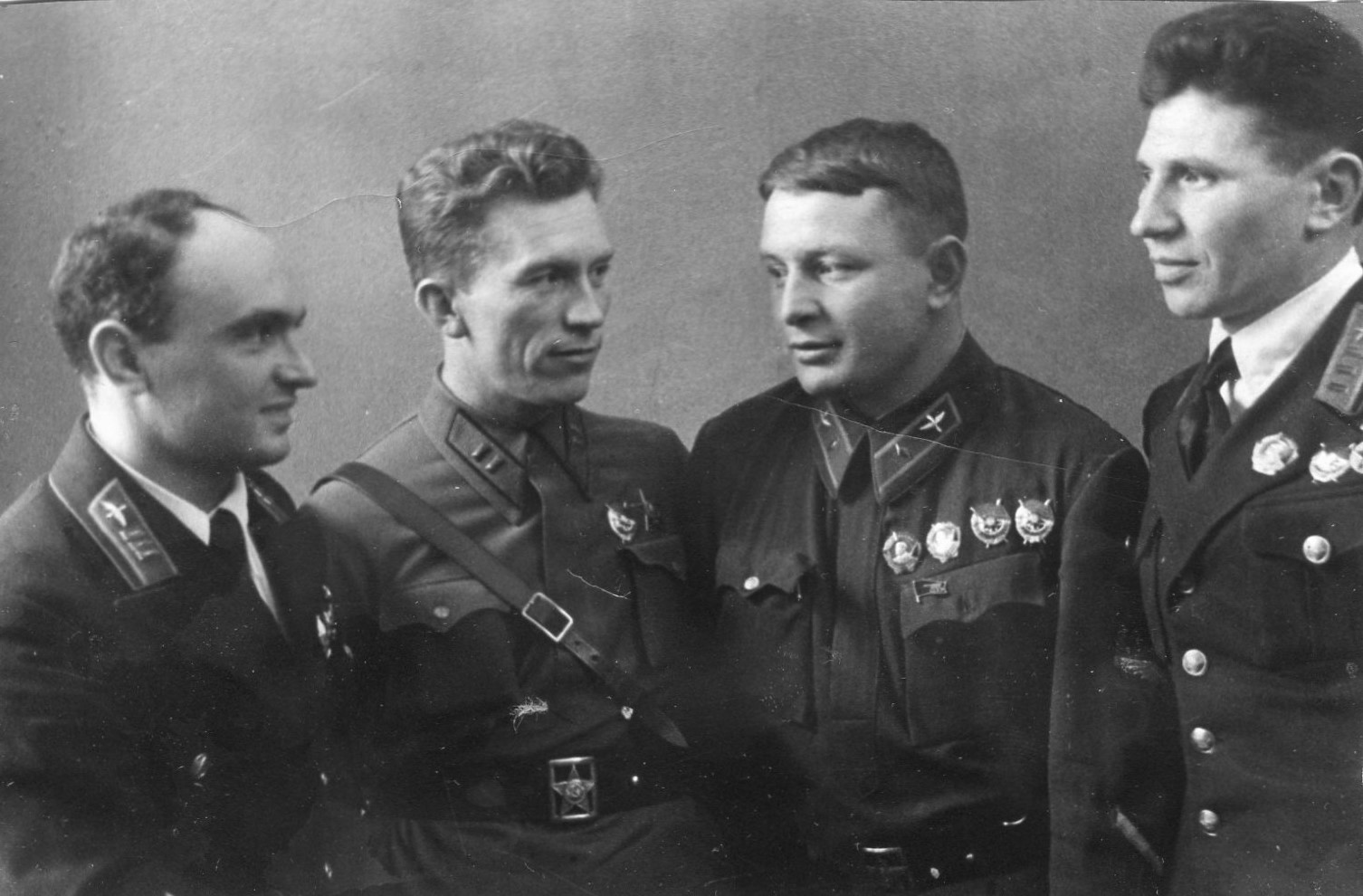
Polynin (far right) with members of the Soviet Volunteer Group in China (1938)

After returning to the USSR, he graduated from advanced training courses for commanding personnel at the Zhukovsky Air Force Academy in 1935. From May 1935, he served as a flight and squadron commander of the 23rd Heavy Bomber Squadron at this academy. Following the outbreak of Second Sino-Japanese War in July 1937, Polynin was sent to Eastern China as part of the Soviet Volunteer Group in China. In China he fought under the pseudonym 'Fyn Po'. From November 1937 to April 1938, he commanded a bomber group equipped with Tupolev SB at Hankou, with 150 combat personnel, including 31 pilots and 31 navigators. He and his unit took part in combat operations over Nanjing and other areas. Polynin particularly distinguished himself on a mission on 23 February 1938, when he led a bombing raid of 28 bombers from his group against a Japanese airfield in Formosa. The Japanese, who did not expect the appearance of Soviet air unit in their deep rear, did not engage in camouflage and air defense measures of the airfield. As a result, they suffered heavy losses from the bombing raid with 40 aircraft, aircraft hangars and fuel storage facilities destroyed in the raid. The bombers safely returned to their base without any losses.

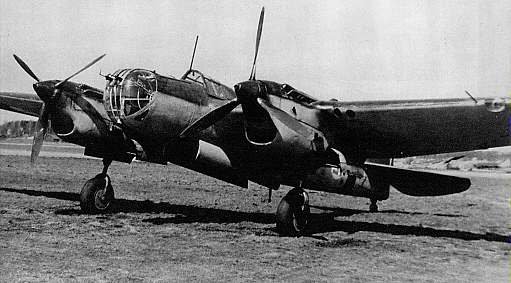
Tupolev SB

By the decree of the Presidium of the Supreme Soviet of the Soviet Union of November 14, 1938, for the courage and heroism shown during the hostilities in China, Polynin was awarded the title of Hero of the Soviet Union along with the award of the Order of Lenin. He returned to USSR in June 1938.

=== World War II ===
Following his return to USSR, he was appointed senior inspector for piloting techniques of the Red Army Air Force Directorate. At the same time, from January 1939, he was the head of the air route for the transfer of aircraft from the USSR to China, with over 400 aircraft being delivered to China. From October 1939, he was the Deputy Commander of the Air Force of the Kiev Military District. During the Winter War in December 1939, Polynin was appointed as the commander of the air force of 13th Army, during which he led air support for the Soviet troops during the hostilities. In August 1940, he was appointed as commander of the 13th Bomber Aviation Division in the Western Military District. The division headquarters was located in Babruysk, Byelorussian Soviet Socialist Republic.

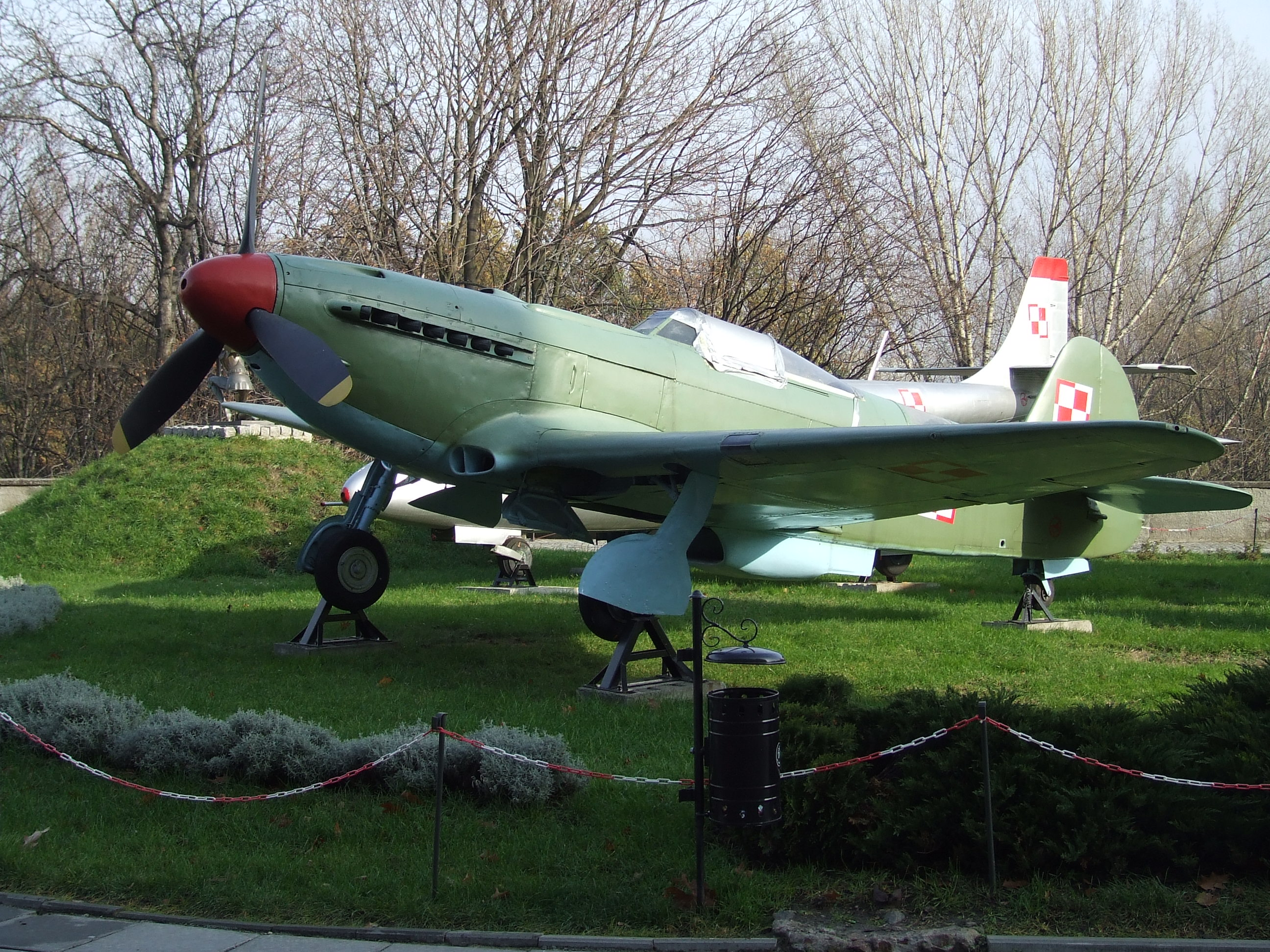
Yak-9 of the Air Force of the Polish Army

Following the outbreak of Operation Barbarossa in June 1941, Polynin served as commander of the 13th Bomber Aviation Division on the Western Front. In the most difficult conditions of the first months of the war, without proper air cover, his unit actively fought the advancing German forces in the Battles of Białystok–Minsk and Smolensk, while suffering significant losses. From August 1941, he was appointed as the commander of the Air Force units at the Bryansk Front, during which he participated in the Roslavl–Novozybkov offensive and in the Battle of Moscow. In May 1942, he was appointed as Deputy Commander of the 2nd Air Army at Bryansk Front, and from September 1942, he was assigned as Deputy Commander of the 6th Air Army of the Northwestern Front and in 1943, he was appointed as commander of the 6th Air Army. In February 1944, the unit was assigned to the 2nd Belorussian Front and took part in the battles of Demyansk, Starorusskaya, Nevel, Polesskaya, and Operation Bagration.

In September 1944, he was transferred to the Lotnictwo Wojska Polskiego (Air Force of the Polish Army) and was appointed the commander, as one of the many Soviet officers who were to ensure that this allied formation remained loyal to communist ideals. Under his command, the Air Force of the Polish Army took part in the Vistula–Oder offensive, East Pomeranian offensive and Battle of Berlin.

During the war, Polynin was mentioned six times in the orders of the Supreme Commander-in-Chief Joseph Stalin, for the successfully carrying out military operations. During the war, he was injured, burned in the air three times, and was shot down twice. He flew 39 types of aircraft. He flew over 500 sorties and spent over 6,000 hours in the air.

=== Post war ===
After the war, Polynin commanded the Polish Air Force till 1947. At the same time, on July 11, 1946, he was awarded the military rank of Colonel general by Soviet Union and Generał broni (Lieutenant General) by Polish People's Republic. From June 1947 to January 1949, he served as commander of the 13th Air Army, and commanded 76th Air Army at Leningrad Military District till October 1949 to May 1950.

In May 1950, he was appointed as commander of the 30th Air Force at the Baltic Military District. In October 1953, he was removed from the commanding units. In January 1954, Polynin was sent to study at K. Е. Voroshilov Higher Military Academy and graduated in 1955. From February 1956 to August 1959, he was assigned as commander of the 57th Air Army at the Carpathian Military District. He served as the member of Supreme Soviet of the Ukrainian SSR during the fifth convocation, from 1959 to 1963.

His final assignments was as Chief of Logistics of the Air Force and a member of the Military Council of the Soviet Air Forces, from August 1959 to May 1971.

Polynin retired from active duty in August 1971.

== Later life ==
Polynin was married to Yelena Samuilovna Maisyuk. They had two daughters Irina (born 1934) and Tatyana (born 1941), and a son Pyotr (born 1949).

Following his retirement from military service, he worked at the Central House of Aviation and Cosmonautics in Moscow and wrote memoirs about his military experiences. Polynin died on 21 November 1981, at the age of 75 and was buried in the Kuntsevo Cemetery.

== Awards and decorations ==
USSR

- Hero of the Soviet Union (14 November 1938)
- Order of Lenin, twice (14 November 1938, 3 November 1953)
- Order of the October Revolution (20 October 1976)
- Order of the Red Banner, five times (25 November 1934, 15 April 1940, 10 November 1941, 17 April 1943, 20 June 1949)
- Order of Kutuzov, 1st class, twice (19 August 1944, 9 August 1945)
- Order of Kutuzov, 2nd class
- Order of the Red Banner of Labour
- Order of the Red Star, twice (3 November 1944, 1955)
- Medal "For the Defence of Moscow" (1 May 1944)
- Medal "For the Liberation of Warsaw" (9 June 1945)
- Medal "For the Capture of Berlin" (9 June 1945)
- Medal "For the Victory over Germany in the Great Patriotic War 1941–1945" (9 May 1945)
- Medal "For the Victory over Japan" (September 30, 1945)
- jubilee medals

Poland

- Commander's Cross of the Order of Polonia Restituta
- Order of the Cross of Grunwald, 2nd class
- Knight's Cross of the Virtuti Militari
- Golden Cross of the Virtuti Militari
- Silver Cross of the Virtuti Militari
- Gold Cross of Merit
- Medal of Merit for National Defence (Gold)
- Medal of Victory and Freedom 1945
- Medal for Oder, Neisse and Baltic
- Medal for Warsaw 1939–1945
- Medal for Participation in the Battle of Berlin

== Dates of rank ==
- Senior lieutenant, Red Air Force: March 14, 1936
- Captain, Red Air Force: February 19, 1938
- Colonel, Red Air Force: August 5, 1938
- Kombrig, Red Air Force: November 29, 1939
- Major general, Red Air Force: February 4, 1940
- Lieutenant general, Red Air Force: May 28, 1943
- Lieutenant general, Polish Air Force: May 3, 1945
- Colonel general, Soviet Air Force: July 11, 1946
