= Polish 9th Fighter Regiment =

9 Pułk Lotnictwa Myśliwskiego Polish 9th Fighter Regiment
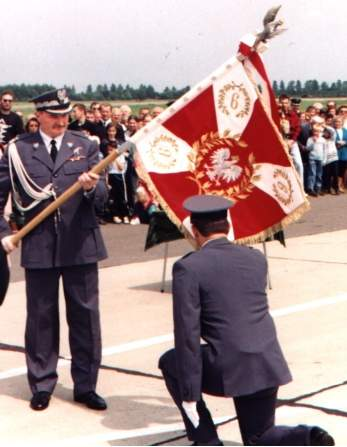
- 9th Fighter Regiment Standard
- Active: 1944–2000
- Disbanded: December 31, 2000 in Zegrze Pomorskie
- Country: Poland
- Non-aerial equipment: 57 mm AZP S-60
- Battle honours: World War II

Aircraft flown
- Fighter: Mikoyan-Gurevich MiG-15, Mikoyan-Gurevich MiG-17, Mikoyan-Gurevich MiG-21, Yakovlev Yak-1, Yakovlev Yak-7, Yakovlev Yak-9, Yakovlev Yak-23
- Utility helicopter: Mil Mi-2
- Trainer: Polikarpov Po-2, PZL TS-8 Bies, PZL TS-11 Iskra, PZL-104 Wilga, Yakovlev Yak-7, Yakovlev Yak-11
- Transport: Antonov An-2

The Polish 9th Fighter Regiment (Polish: 9 Pułk Lotnictwa Myśliwskiego) was a fighter regiment established in 1944 in Malbork that was a part of the Air Force of the Polish Army. The regiment was stationed in Debrzno until it was disbanded on December 31, 2000, in Zegrze Pomorskie.

== History ==
On August 7, 1944, the Soviet Red Army issued an executive order for the formation of the 1st Mixed Air Corps (Polish: 1 Meszany Korpus Lotniczy) in the regions of Kazan and Kharkiv. The Corps was created from September 1944 to January 1945.

The Corps included the 3rd Fighter Division, which was formed on January 20, 1944 from the 10th Training Brigade of the 2nd Air Army. This division consisted of the 11th and 10th Fighter Regiments, which had previously been stationed in Karłowo airfield, near Poltava, as well as the newly created 9th Fighter Regiment. The division was equipped with fighter aircraft, and placed under the command of Lieutenant Colonel Wasyl Dobraszow in Krasnogród.

On May 11, 1959, the Defense Minister, General Marian Spychalski, made an official state inspection of the regiment. He was accompanied by the Head of General Staff General Jerzy Bordziłowski and Jan Frey-Bielecki, the Commander of the Air Force.

From September 28 to October 8, 1959, the regiment participated in the Air Force's championship air games in Wrocław.

On July 22, 1987, Defense Minister General Florian Siwicki made a surprise inspection of the regiment. After conducting combat preparedness drills and reserve mobilization exercises, he concluded that the regiment showed high efficiency, willingness, and enthusiasm in carrying out their duties

On June 2, 1991, the regiment welcomed Pope John Paul II on behalf of President Lech Wałęsa. During the subsequent Mass, which took place on an air field in Zegrze Pomorskie, the Pope addressed the soldiers, saying, "Ci wszyscy, którzy sprawie Ojczyzny oddani, służą w wojsku, niech uważają siebie za sługi bezpieczeństwa i wolności narodów. Po raz pierwszy dane mi jest - podczas odwiedzin w Ojczyźnie - przemówić do żołnierzy na specjalnym spotkaniu."

On June 14, 1996, President Aleksander Kwaśniewski visited the regiment while he was visiting Koszalin Voivodeship.

== Structure ==
The regiment consisted of the regimental command and staff, two fighter squadrons, a technical squadron, a supply battalion, and a support and communications battalion. Their proper names, in Polish, were as follows:

- Stanowisko Dowodzenia (Regimental Command)
- Sztab (Staff)
- 1 eskadra lotnictwa myśliwskiego (1st fighter squadron)
- 2 eskadra lotnictwa myśliwskiego (2nd fighter squadron)
- eskadra techniczna (technical squadron)
  - Służba Inżynieryjno-Lotniskowa (SIL)
  - Sekcja Przechowywania i Elaboracji Rakiet (SPiER)
  - klucz remontu płatowca i silnika
  - klucz remontu osprzętu
  - klucz remontu Urządzeń Radioelektronicznych
  - klucz remontu uzbrojenia
- batalion zaopatrzenia (supply battalion)
  - kompania obsługi lotniska
  - kompania samochodowa
  - kompania ochrony
- batalion łączności i ubezpieczenia lotów (support and communications battalion)
  - kompania łączności
  - kompania ubezpieczenia lotów
  - Węzeł Łączności

The technical squadron had a variety of duties, including servicing airports, storing missiles, and maintaining and refurbishing aircraft, engines, radio and electrical equipment, and weapons. The supply battalion's duties include shuttle service, the upkeep and operation of company cars, and protection.

== Equipment ==
During the sixty year operating history of the regiment, it operated a number of different Soviet- and Polish-built aircraft. These aircraft were mostly jet fighters and various forms of training aircraft, but also included a single transport helicopter.

- Fighter aircraft:
  - Mikoyan-Gurevich MiG-15
  - Mikoyan-Gurevich MiG-17
  - Mikoyan-Gurevich MiG-21
  - Yakovlev Yak-1
  - Yakovlev Yak-7
  - Yakovlev Yak-9
  - Yakovlev Yak-23
- Trainer aircraft:
  - Polikarpov Po-2
  - PZL TS-8 Bies
  - PZL TS-11 Iskra
  - PZL-104 Wilga
  - Yakovlev Yak-7
  - Yakovlev Yak-11
- Transport helicopter:
  - Antonov An-2

The Regiment operated the Lim-1, Lim-2, and SB Lim-2 versions of the MiG-15, as well as the Lim-5 version of the MiG-17. All Lim-designated MiG aircraft were manufactured in Poland. In addition to the listed aircraft, the regiment also operated the 57 mm AZP S-60 anti-aircraft gun.

== Commanders ==
- April 11, 1952 – July 2, 1954 – Major Jan Gołubickij
- July 2, 1954 – November 9, 1954 – Capt. Marian Chrzan
- September 9, 1954 – November 18, 1957 – Major Marian Bondzior
- November 18, 1957 – February 24, 1962 – Major Janusz Żywno
- February 24, 1962 – March 13, 1964 – Major Zdzisław Strelau
- March 14, 1964 – December 14, 1966 – Major Stanisław Stalicki
- December 14, 1966 – September 14, 1971 – Lt. Col. Czesław Bil
- September 14, 1971 – February 20, 1974 – Lt. Col. Władysław Pasiewicz
- February 20, 1974 – October 12, 1976 – Lt. Col. Henryk Sygnowski
- October 12, 1976 – June 4, 1983 – Lt. Col. Bogusław Wasilewski
- June 4, 1983 – October 22, 1986 – Lt. Col. Kazimierz Małecki
- October 22, 1986 – February 18, 1989 – Lt. Col. Wojciech Górski
- February 18, 1989 – February 14, 1991 – Lt. Col. Zbigniew Bielewicz
- October 14, 1991 – January 19, 1997 – Lt. Col. Piotr Luśnia
- January 19, 1997 – December 31, 2000 – Lt. Col. Sławomir Kałuziński
