= Suriname Air Force =

Air component of the national army of Suriname

- Surinaamse Luchtmacht
- Suriname Air Force roundel
- Founded: 1982; 44 years ago
- Country: Suriname
- Type: Air force
- Role: Transport; Patrol; Aerial firefighting
- Size: 3 aircraft
- Part of: Suriname National Army
- Headquarters: Zorg en Hoop Air Force Base
- Mottos: Latin: Veni, vidi, vici; "I came, I saw, I conquered"

Commanders
- Current commander: Lieutenant Colonel Marven van Huisduinen
- Notable commanders: Major Eddie Djoe (first Air Force Commander), Captain John-Marc Arron (Commander of the Helicopter Wing)

Insignia
- Roundel

- Fin flash

Aircraft flown
- Utility helicopter: HAL Chetak

The Suriname Air Force (Dutch: Surinaamse Luchtmacht) is the air component of the Military of Suriname. All aircraft of the Suriname Air Force undertake border patrols, utility transport, and search and rescue missions from Zorg en Hoop Airport, the Air Force's main base. Aircraft are occasionally transferred to other air bases in the nation, which include Johan Adolf Pengel International Airport, Major Fernandes Airfield, Albina Airstrip, and Moengo Airstrip. The head of the Suriname Air Force is the Commander of the Air Force, currently Lieutenant Colonel Marven van Huisduinen, who took over the role in March 2019 from former Commander Robert Kartodikromo. The Air Force is further split into several wings, including the Helicopter Wing, the current Commander of which being Captain John-Marc Arron.

== History ==
Upon independence in 1975, the Military of Suriname became Surinamese Armed Forces (Surinaamse Krijgsmacht). After a coup on February 25, 1980, the armed forces became the National Army (Nationaal Leger). In 1982 the Suriname Air Force was formed as a division of the Suriname National Army. Its first Commander was lieutenant Eddie Alenso Savalie Djoe, who held the position from 1983 until 1989. In 1982 the Air Force bought its first aircraft, the Hughes 500 - Model 369D helicopter, for patrolling missions, though it soon crashed in March of that year, killing all five crewmembers aboard the plane at the time (Major Henk Fernandes, second lieutenant Norman de Miranda, soldier Tjon a Kon and soldier Kowid and American pilot Foster Ford). Three months later, the Suriname Air Force acquired four Pilatus Britten Norman BN-2B Defenders. In 1986 anti-government guerrilla activity from the Jungle Commando prompted the government to acquire two Aérospatiale SA.316B Alouette III helicopters from the Portuguese Air Force, one of which later crashed. Later that year three Pilatus PC-7 planes were ordered for counter-insurgency missions, although only two of the three were delivered, of which one was returned to Pilatus.

In 1987 the Suriname Air Force acquired a Bell 205 Iroquois from Venezuela to use as a gunship. It crashed in July of that year due to a mechanical failure, killing the American pilot Billy Pearson, and seriously injuring the American mechanic and the plane's four Surinamese crewmembers. The helicopter was later repaired and put back into action, eventually being sold to the United States Air Force in 1991. In the late 1980s a Cessna 172 Skyhawk and a Cessna 206 were acquired, and in 1993 a Cessna T303 Crusader was acquired as well. In 1999, two CASA C-212 Aviocar turbo-prop engined aircraft were delivered, with one of the two having a Bendix RDR-1500 surveillance radar for maritime patrol. In addition to patrol and transport duties, the two aircraft were used to protect Suriname's fishing industry, and participated in governmental anti-narcotics activities. In 2012, due to rising maintenance costs, the two planes were sold to Fayard Enterprises in the United States. By 2014 the whole remaining SAF inventory of six planes was put up for sale.

In 2009, the Suriname Air Force ordered three single-engined HAL Chetak helicopters from Hindustan Aeronautics Limited for approximately US$13.4 million, facilitated through a line of credit from India. Mechanics and pilots from the Suriname Air Force were trained in India to operate the new helicopters in 2012 and 2014, respectively. In January 2015, the three helicopters were delivered to Suriname Air Force, which assigned them to the cities of Paramaribo, Nickerie, and Albina. In March of that year, the Defence Minister of Suriname announced that a de Havilland Canada DHC-6 Twin Otter would soon be delivered to the Suriname Air Force, with pilots allegedly already in training to operate it. This never materialized.

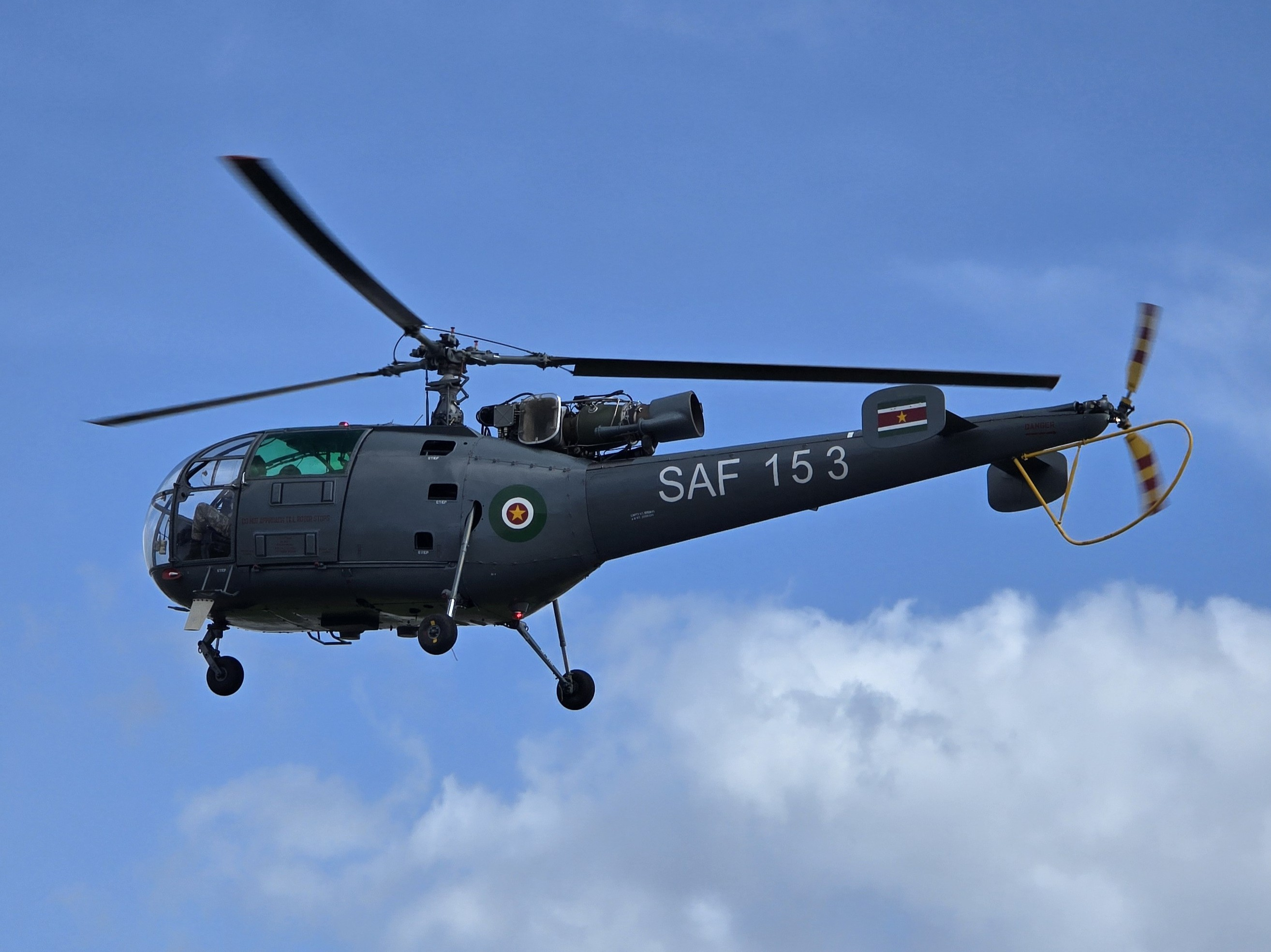

== Aircraft ==
=== Current ===
Aircraft	Origin	Type	Variant	In service	Notes
Helicopters
HAL Chetak	India	SAR / Utility		3	Obtained from India.

=== Former ===
Previous aircraft operated by the Suriname Air Force consisted of the Pilatus PC-7, Cessna 172, Cessna 206, Cessna T303, BN-2B Defender, CASA C-212 Aviocar, Bell 205, Aérospatiale Alouette III, and the Hughes 500 helicopter.
