= Military aircraft insignia =

Markings applied to aircraft for visual identification

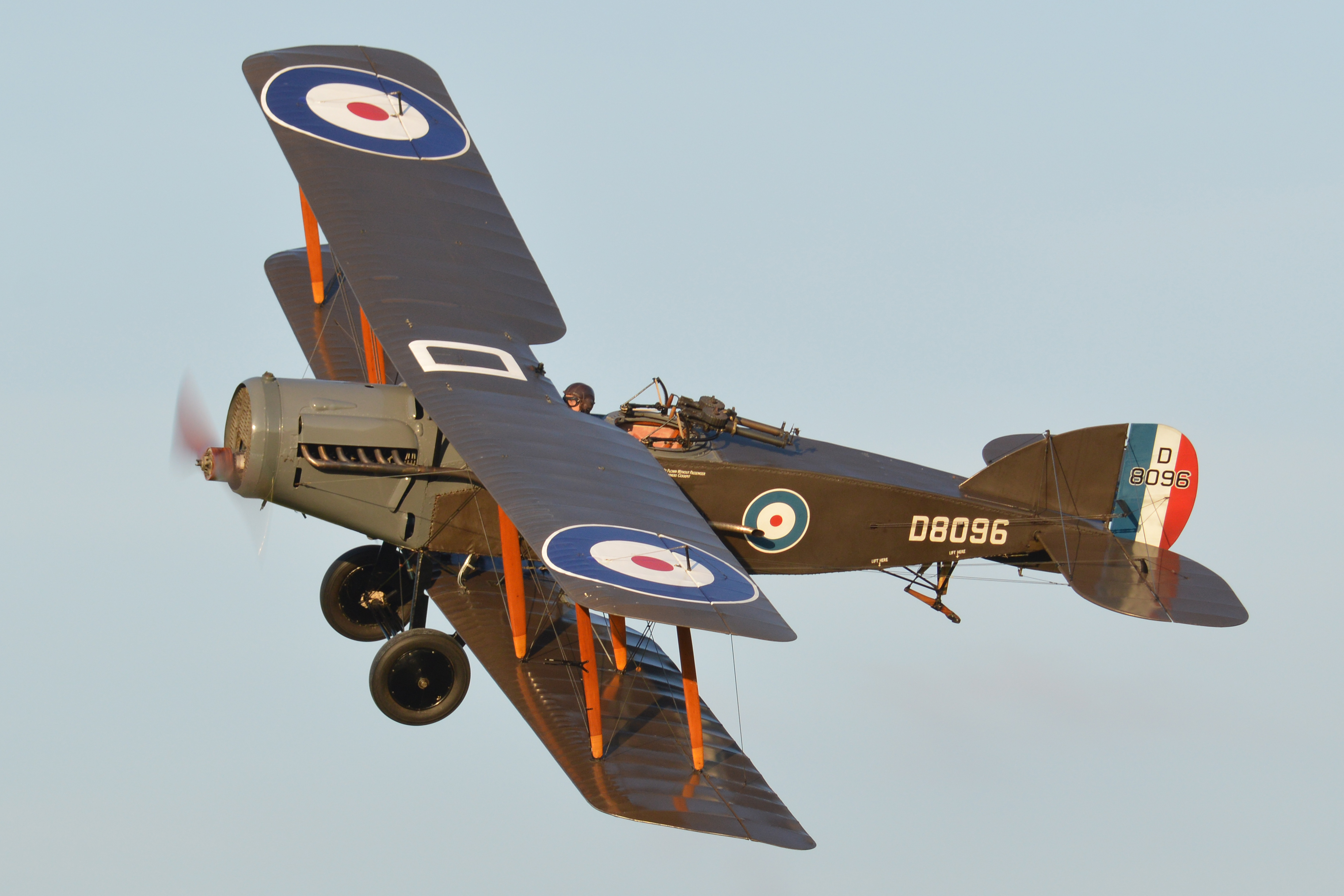
A Bristol F.2 with British markings standardised during the First World War.

Military aircraft insignia are insignia applied to military aircraft to visually identify the nation or branch of military service to which the aircraft belong. Many insignia are in the form of a circular roundel or modified roundel; other shapes such as stars, crosses, squares, or triangles are also used. Insignia are often displayed on the sides of the fuselage, the upper and lower surfaces of the wings, as well as on the fin or rudder of an aircraft, although considerable variation can be found amongst different air arms and within specific air arms over time.

== History ==
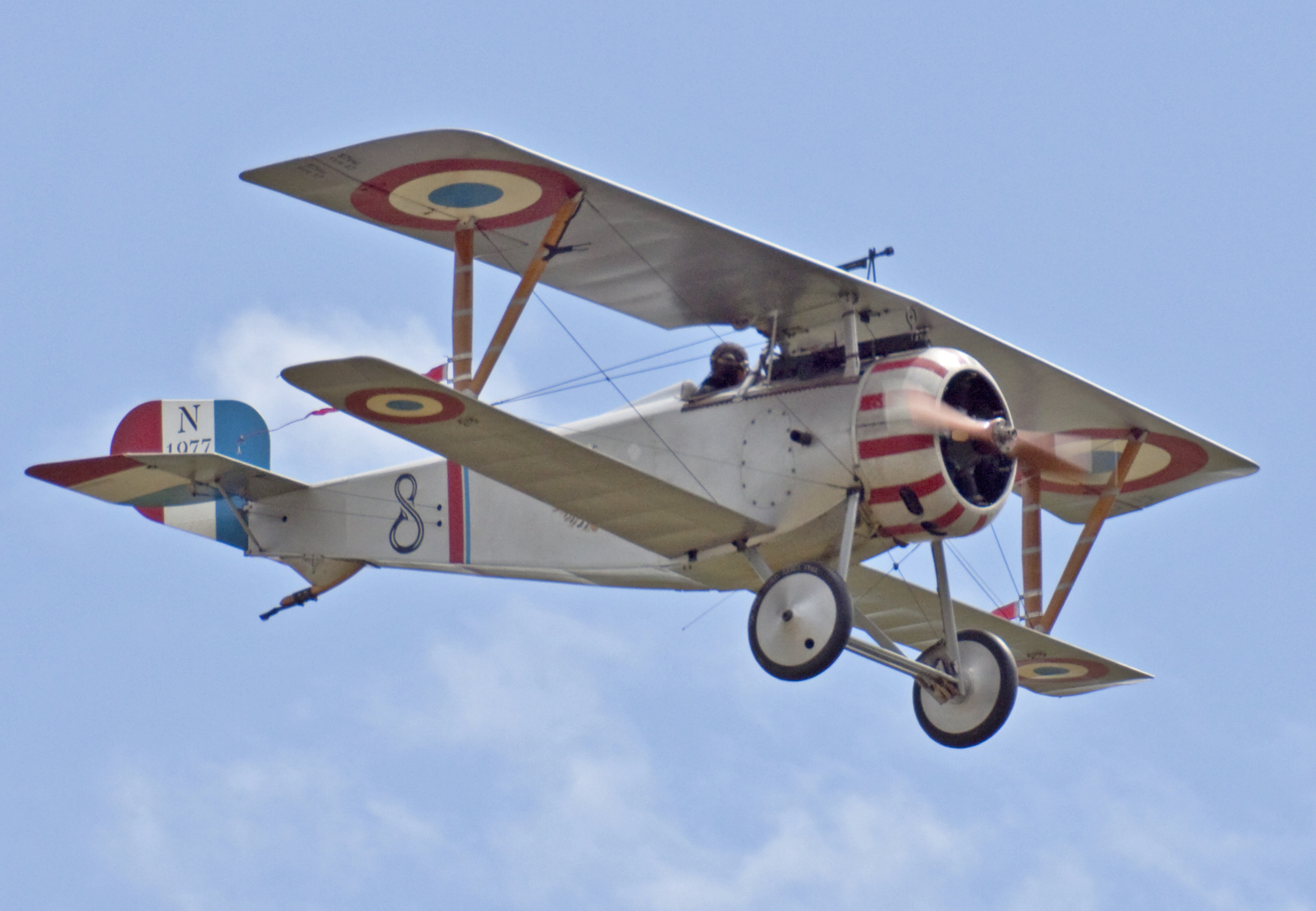
World War I French Nieuport 17 showing large wing roundels.

=== France ===
The first use of national insignia on military aircraft was before the First World War by the French Aéronautique Militaire, which mandated the application of roundels in 1912. The chosen design was the French national cockade, which consisted of a blue-white-red emblem, going outwards from centre to rim, mirroring the colours of the French flag. In addition, aircraft rudders were painted the same colours in vertical stripes, with the blue vertical stripe of the tricolours forwardmost. Similar national cockades were designed and adopted for use as aircraft roundels by the air forces of other countries, including the Royal Flying Corps (RFC) and U.S. Army Air Service.

=== Germany ===
Of all the early operators of military aircraft, Germany was unusual in not using circular roundels. After evaluating several possible markings, including a black, red, and white checkerboard, a similarly coloured roundel, and black stripes, it chose a black 'iron cross' on a square white field, as it was already in use on various flags, and reflected Germany's heritage as the Holy Roman Empire. The Imperial German Army's mobilisation led to orders in September 1914 to paint all-black Eisernes Kreuz (iron cross) insignia with wide-flared arms over a white field; usually square in shape, on the wings and tails of all aircraft flown by its air arm, then known as the Fliegertruppe des Deutschen Kaiserreiches. The fuselage was also usually marked with a cross on each side, but this was optional. The form and location of the initial cross was largely up to the painter, which led to considerable variation, and even to the white portion being omitted. An iron cross with explicit proportions superseded the first cross in July 1916. Initially, this second cross was also painted on a white field, but in October 1916, it was reduced to a 5 centimetres (2.0 inches) border completely surrounding the cross, even the ends of the flared arms. That same month, the Army's air arm was renamed Deutsche Luftstreitkräfte. In March 1918, a straight black cross with narrow white borders on all sides of the cross was ordered, but proportions were not set until April 1918, resulting in many of those repainted in the field having non-standard proportions. This was then replaced in May by a narrower, straight-armed cross that extended the full chord of wings, with the white border restricted to the sides of the cross's bars. In June, it ceased to be used full chord, with the bars all being the same length. The white on any of these could be omitted when used on a white background, and sometimes on the rudder or on night bombers.

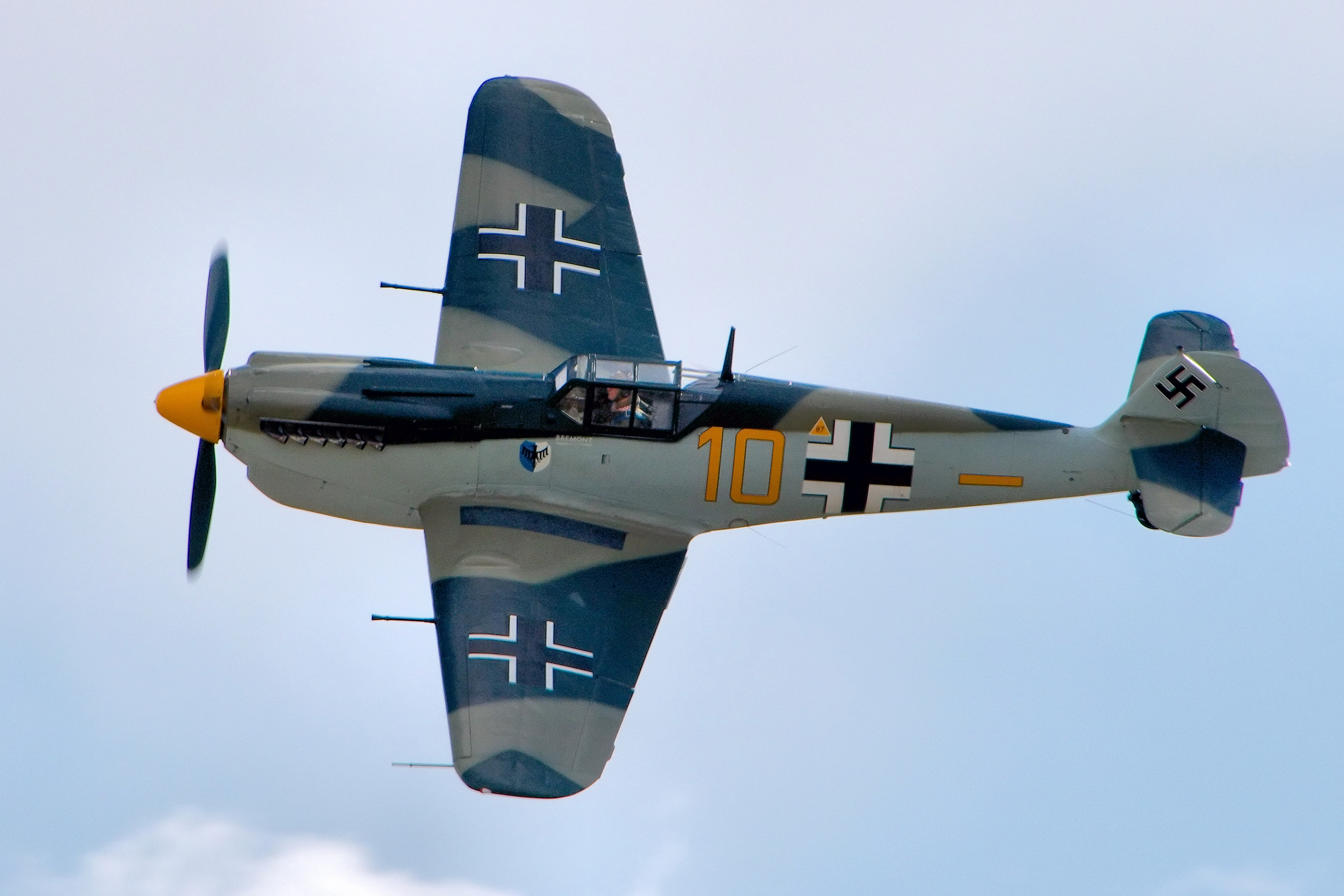
An Hispano Aviación HA-1112 marked as a Messerschmitt Bf 109 showing the standard German crosses worn during World War II.

Much like the French roundel, variations of the cross would be used on countries allied with Germany, including the Austro-Hungary (combined with red-white-red stripes on the wings until 1916), Bulgaria, Croatia (stylised as a leaf), Hungary (reversed colours), Romania (a blue-rimmed yellow cross with the tricolour roundel in the middle; the shape was also the stylised monogram of the monarch), and Slovakia (blue cross with a red dot in the middle).

With the dissolution of the German Army's Luftstreitkräfte in May 1920, military insignia would disappear until the rise of the Nazi Party, which imposed new rules on aircraft in 1937, starting with the use of the German red / white / black flag on the tails' starboard side of all aircraft, with the port side showing a Nazi Party flag. When the Luftwaffe's re-establishment was made official, these markings were used by military aircraft, while the 1918 Balkenkreuz crosses were reintroduced. Two standardised proportions of the crosses were introduced by July 1939, with differing widths for the quartet of white 'flanks' on each insignia. When camouflage was introduced prior to the invasion of Poland, the flags were dispensed with, replacing them with a black and white swastika on both sides of the tail. During the ensuing war, the crosses would be further simplified, leaving only the borders in a contrasting colour.

After the Second World War, West Germany reverted to using a variation of the 1916 iron cross, using the white 'flanks' of the Balkenkreuz following the now-curved sides of each arm, while East Germany used a diamond marking based on their flag, with the coat of arms from the flag. The reunification of Germany in 1990 resulted in the West German iron cross replacing the East German insignia for all German military aircraft.

=== United Kingdom and British Commonwealth nations ===
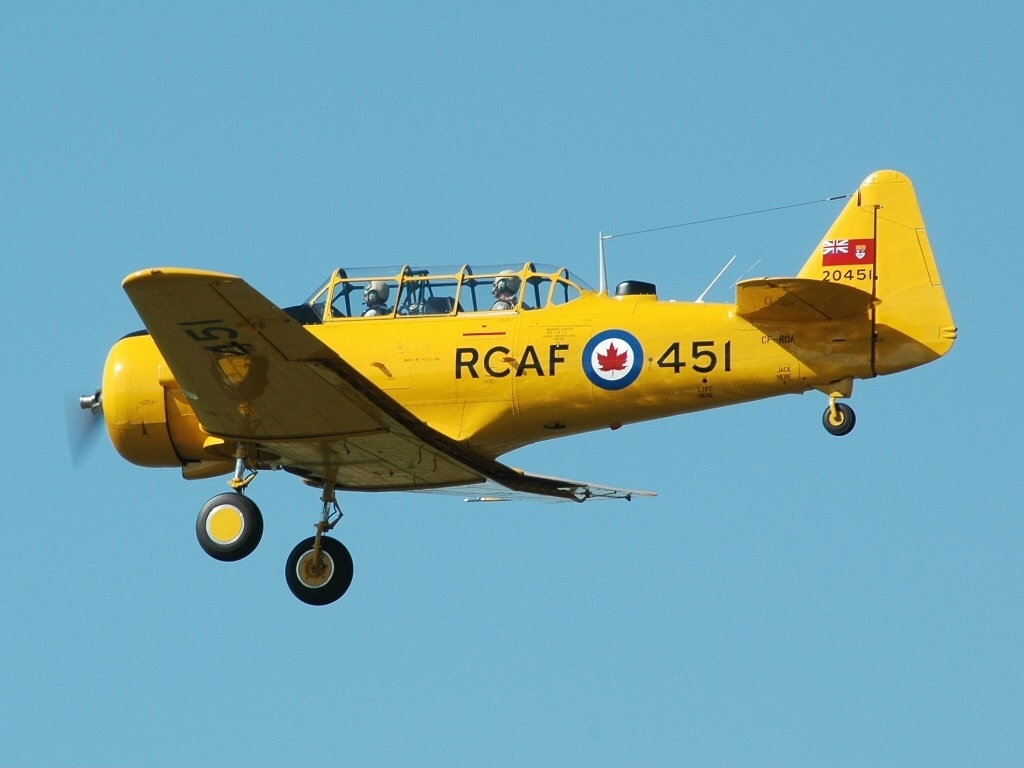
A Royal Canadian Air Force (RCAF) Harvard 4 with their maple leaf insert onto the Royal Air Force roundel design.

The British Royal Flying Corps (RFC) abandoned their original painted Union Flags because, from a distance, they looked too much like the Eisernes Kreuz (Iron Cross) used on German aircraft. The Royal Naval Air Service (RNAS) used either a plain red ring (with the clear-doped linen covering forming the light coloured centre), or a red-rimmed white circle on their wings for a short period; almost exactly resembling those in simultaneous use by the neutral predecessors of today's Royal Danish Air Force, before both British air arms adopted a roundel resembling the French one, but with the colours reversed, (red-white-blue from centre to rim). The two separate army and naval air arms joined on 1 April 1918 to form the Royal Air Force (RAF).

The British roundel design, with variations in proportions and shades, has existed in one form or another to this very day. The Royal Canadian Air Force (RCAF) roundel was based on the RAF roundel used previously on Canadian military aircraft. From World War I onwards, a variant of the British red-white-blue roundel with the white omitted has been used on camouflaged aircraft, which between the wars meant night bombers. During the Second World War, the colours were toned down and the proportions adjusted to reduce the brightness of the roundel, with the white being reduced to a thin line, or eliminated. In the Asia-Pacific region, the red inner circle of roundels was painted white or light blue to avoid confusion with Hinomaru markings on Japanese aircraft (still used by the Japan Self-Defense Forces to this day), much as the United States roundel omitted the red for the same reason.

After the Second World War, the RAF roundel design was modified by Commonwealth air forces, with the central red disc replaced with a red maple leaf (Royal Canadian Air Force), red kangaroo (Royal Australian Air Force), red kiwi (Royal New Zealand Air Force), and an orange Springbok (South African Air Force); the South African version of the RAF roundel existed until 1958.

=== Low-visibility insignia ===
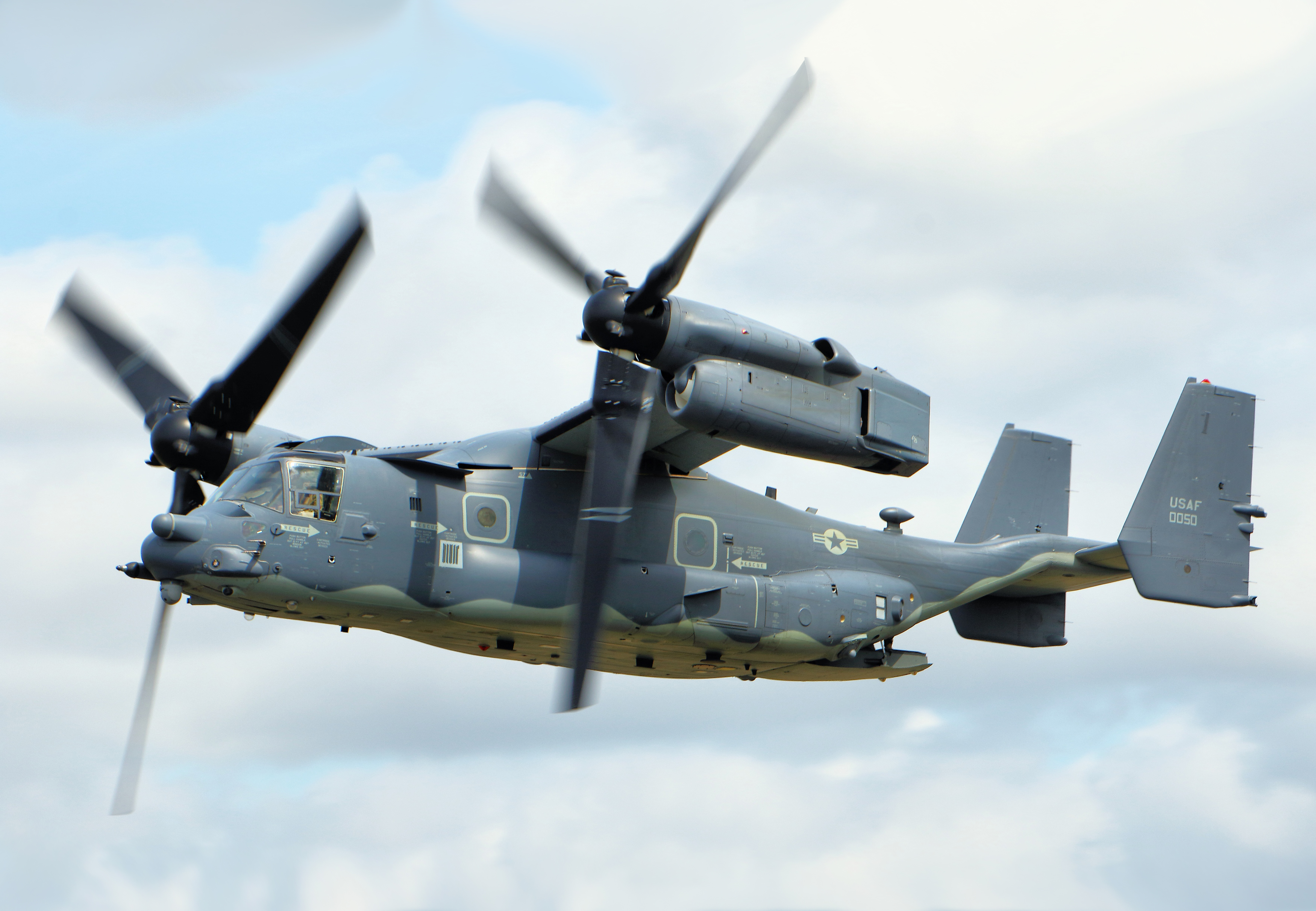
A CV-22 Osprey with low-visibility United States Air Force insignia on fuselage.

In the later stages of the World War I, the British Royal Flying Corps started using roundels without conspicuous white circles on night-flying aircraft, such as the Handley Page O/400. As early as 1942-43, and again in recent decades, 'low-visibility' insignia have increasingly been used on camouflaged aircraft. These have subdued, low-contrast colours (often shades of grey or black), and frequently take the form of stencilled outlines. Previously, low-visibility markings were used to increase ambiguity as to whose aircraft it was, and to avoid compromising the camouflage, all while still complying with international norms governing recognition markings.

The World War II German Luftwaffe often used such 'low-visibility' versions of their national Balkenkreuz insignia from the mid-war period through to V-E Day, omitting the central black 'core' cross, and only using the 'flanks' of the cross instead, in either black or white versions, which was often done (as an outline only) to the vertical fin or rudder's swastika as well.

== Fin flashes ==
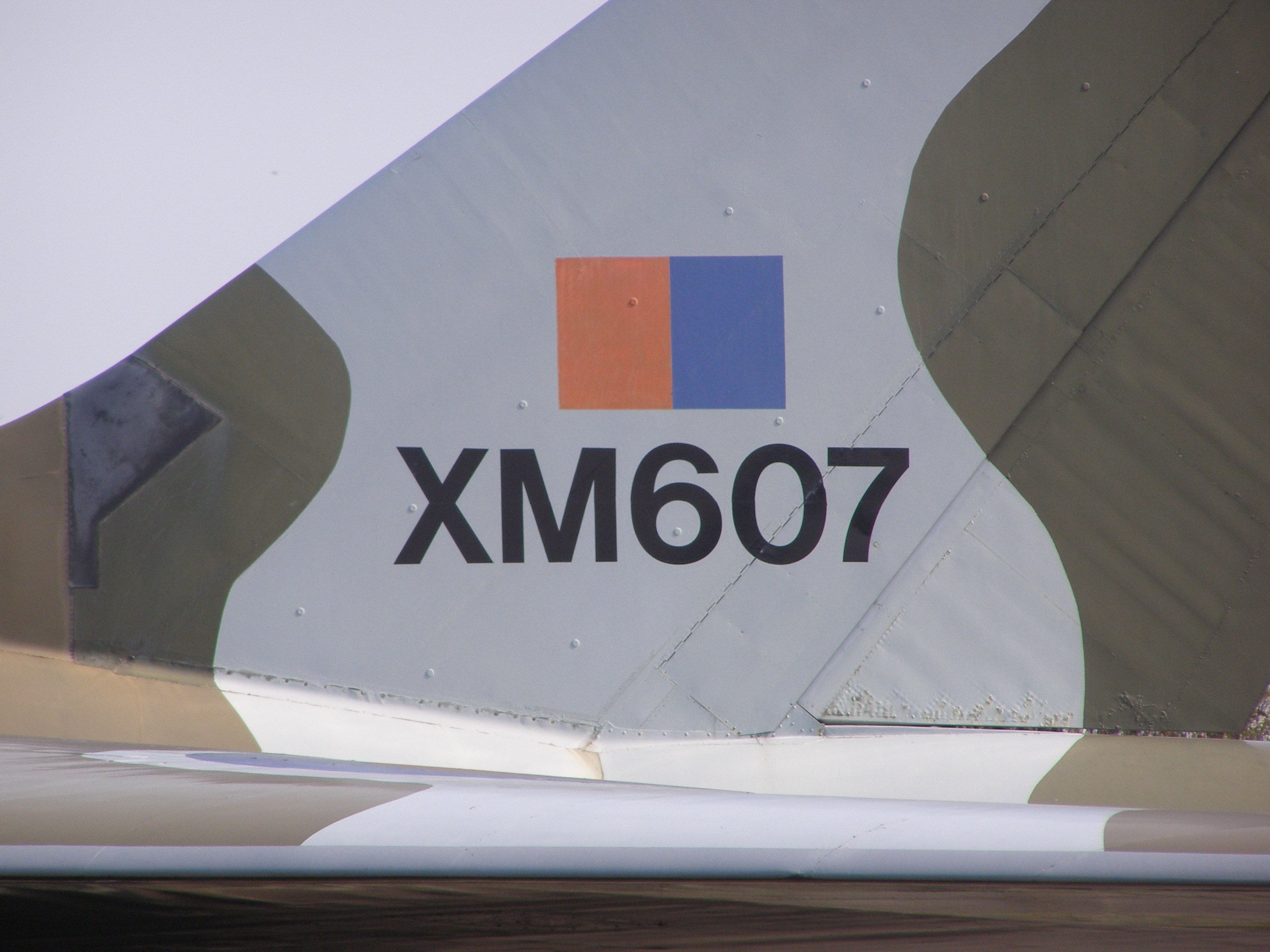
Low-visibility Royal Air Force fin flash above the aircraft registration on an Avro Vulcan tail fin.

In addition to insignia displayed on military aircraft wings and fuselages, usually in the form of roundels, a fin flash may also be displayed on the fin or rudder. A fin flash often takes the form of vertical, horizontal, or slanted stripes in the same colours as the main insignia, similar to a contemporary tactical recognition flash, and may be referred to as 'rudder stripes' if they appear on the rudder instead of the fin, as with the French Armée de l'Air. Alternatively, a national flag, a roundel or sometimes an emblem or coat of arms may be used.

== Gallery of insignia ==
=== Current insignias of national air forces ===
Images shown in the following sections are as they appear on the left side of the aircraft (i.e., with the left side of the fin flash leading). In cases where there are no asymmetrical details, such as coats of arms or text that cannot be reversed, the image may be reversed for the right side (such as with the Royal Air Force fin flash) to keep the same side forward, much as with a flag. When a national flag is used, the left side of the aircraft often displays the reverse or back side of the flag as it is normally flown. Exceptions include the German Third Reich's ostensibly 'civilian' aircraft in the 1930s, which used the old black-white-red German flag on the right side of the fin and rudder, and the Nazi Party flag on the left side.

For some countries, a low-visibility variant is also used to avoid compromising aircraft camouflage, and in some cases, to avoid producing a hot spot visible to infrared sensors, such as those used on air-to-air missiles.

Afghanistan

Albania

Algeria

Angola
(variant 1)

Angola
(variant 2)

Antigua and Barbuda

Argentina

Argentina
(low visibility)

Argentine Naval Aviation

Argentine Naval Aviation
(low visibility)

Armenia
(Variant 1)

Armenia
(Variant 2)

Australia

Australia
(low visibility)

Australia
(army aviation)

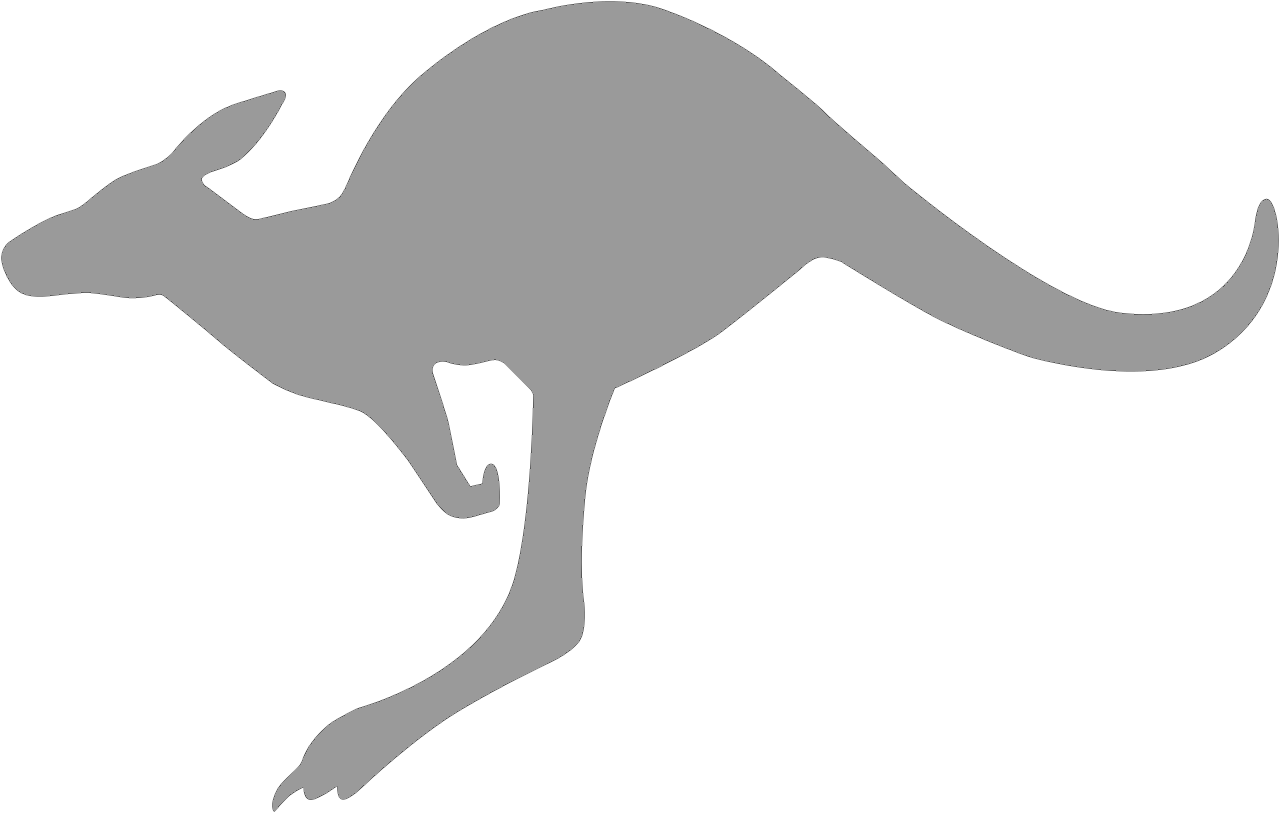
Australia
(army aviation)
(low visibility)

Austria

Azerbaijan

Bahamas

Bahrain

Bangladesh

Bangladesh
(naval aviation)

Belarus

Belgium

Benin

Bolivia

Botswana

Brazil

Brazil
(low visibility)

Brazil
(naval aviation)

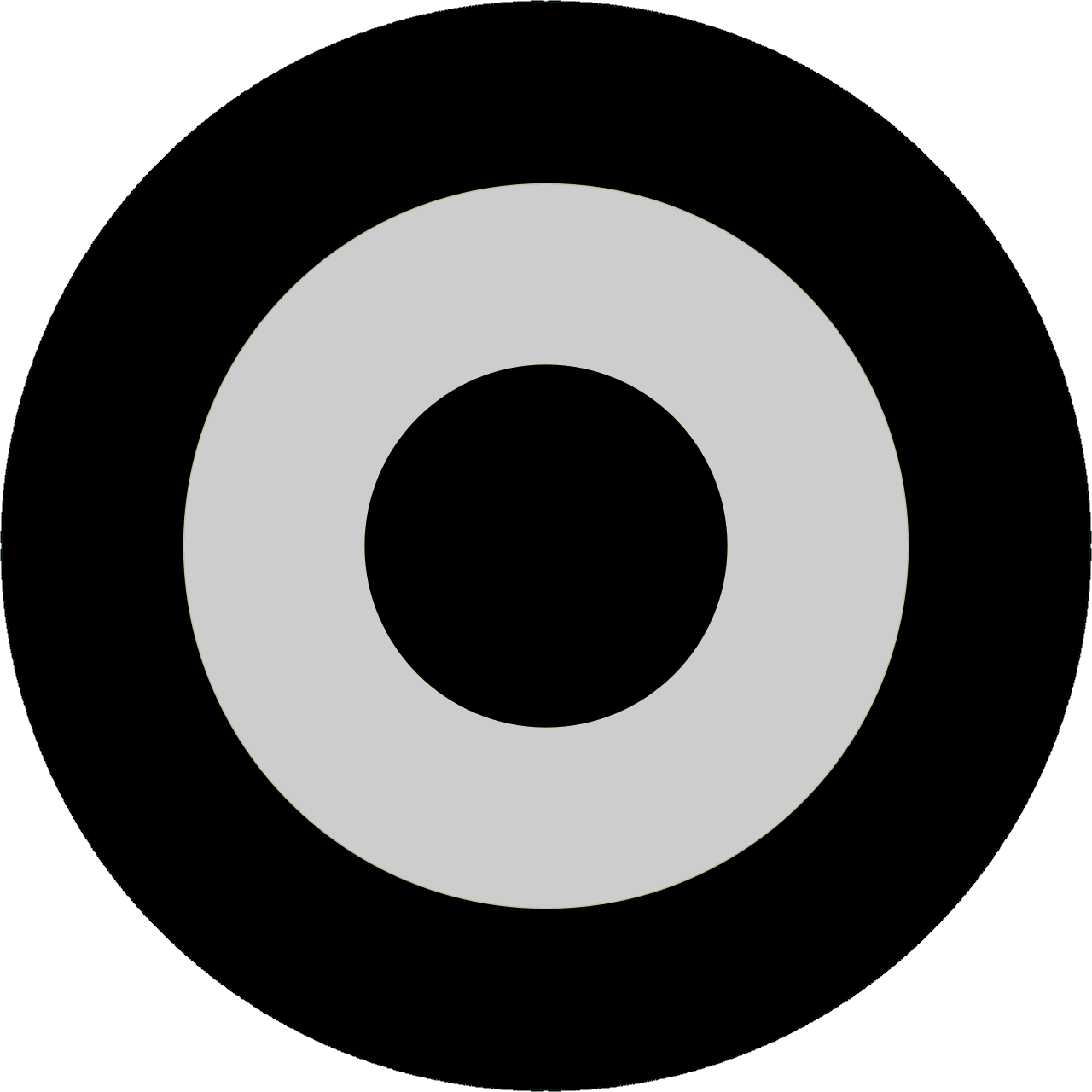
Brazil
(naval aviation)
(low visibility)

Brazil
(army aviation)

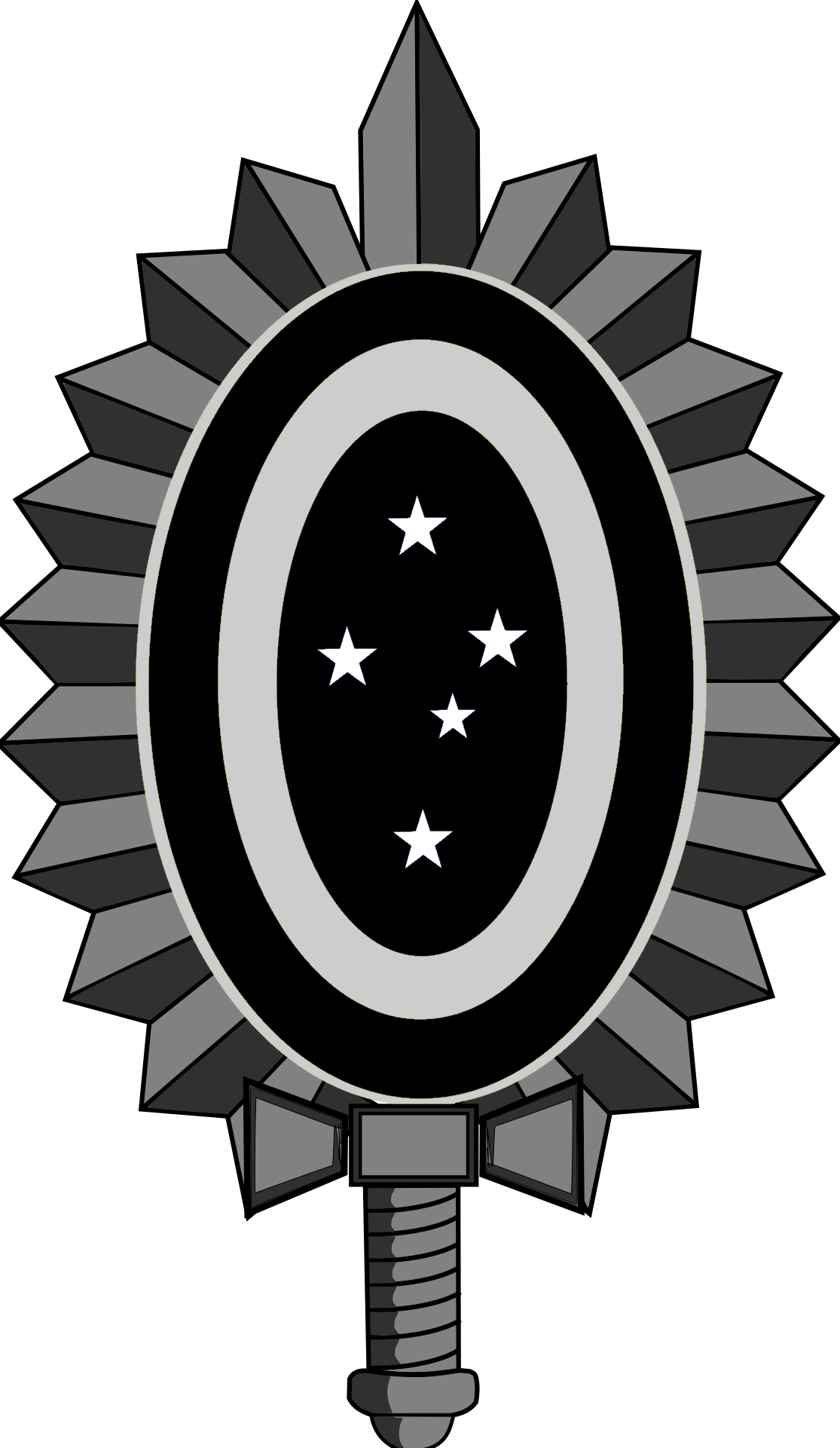
Brazil
(army aviation)
(low visibility)

Bulgaria

Burkina Faso

Burundi

Cambodia

Cameroon

Canada

Canada
(low visibility)

Central African Republic

Chad

Chile

Chile
(low visibility)

Chile
(naval aviation)

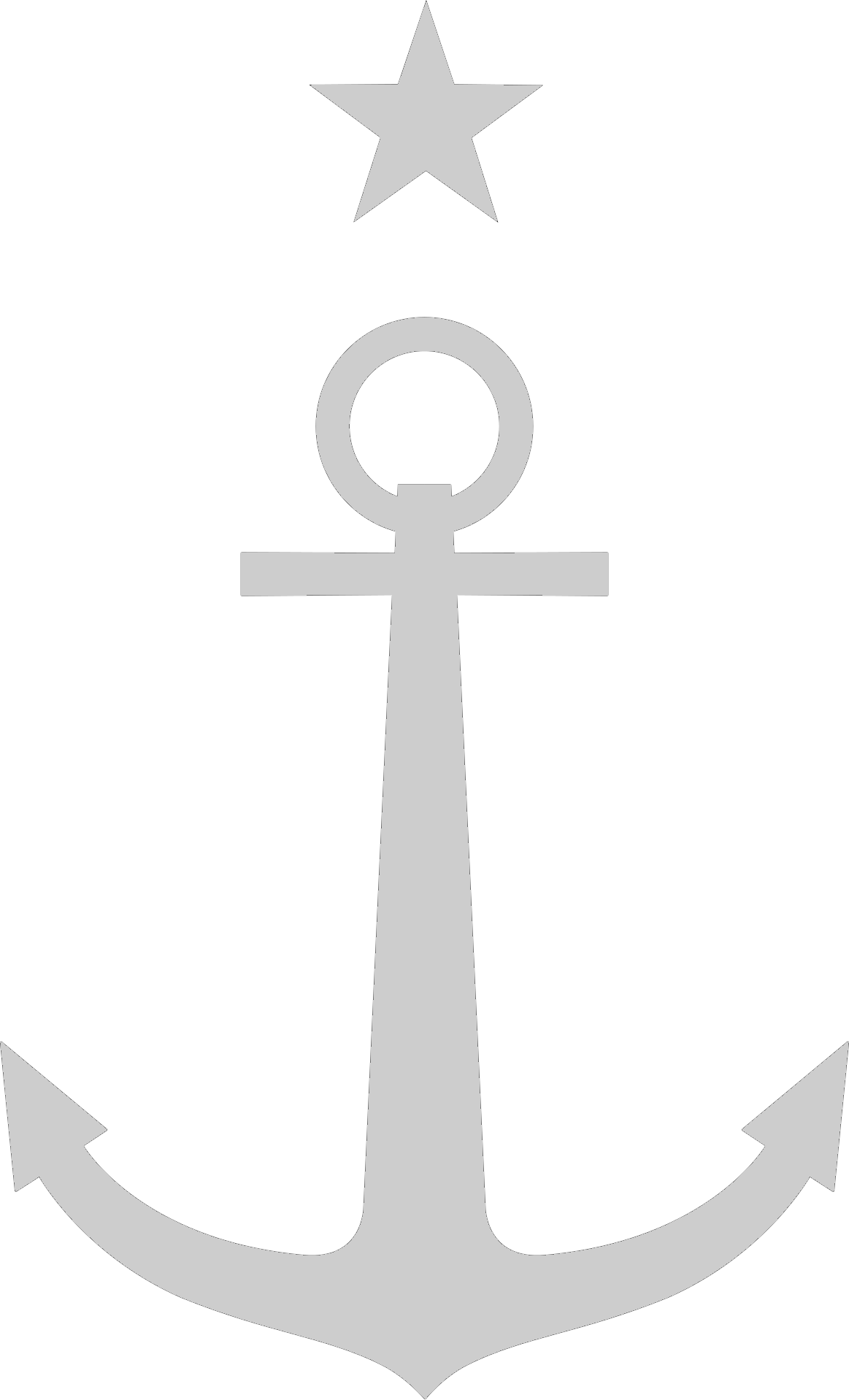
Chile
(naval aviation)
(low visibility)

People's Republic of China

People's Republic of China
(low visibility)

Republic of China (Taiwan)

Republic of China (Taiwan)
(low visibility)

Colombia

Colombia
(low visibility)

Colombia
(naval aviation)

Colombia
(naval aviation,
low visibility)

Republic of Congo

Democratic Republic of the Congo

Côte d'Ivoire

Croatia

Croatia
(low visibility)

Cuba

Cuba
(Naval Aviation)

Cyprus

Czech Republic

Czech Republic
(low visibility)

Denmark

Djibouti

Dominican Republic

Dominican Republic
(low visibility)

Ecuador

Ecuador
(naval aviation)

Egypt

Equatorial Guinea

El Salvador

Eritrea

Estonia

Ethiopia

Finland

Finland
(low visibility)

France

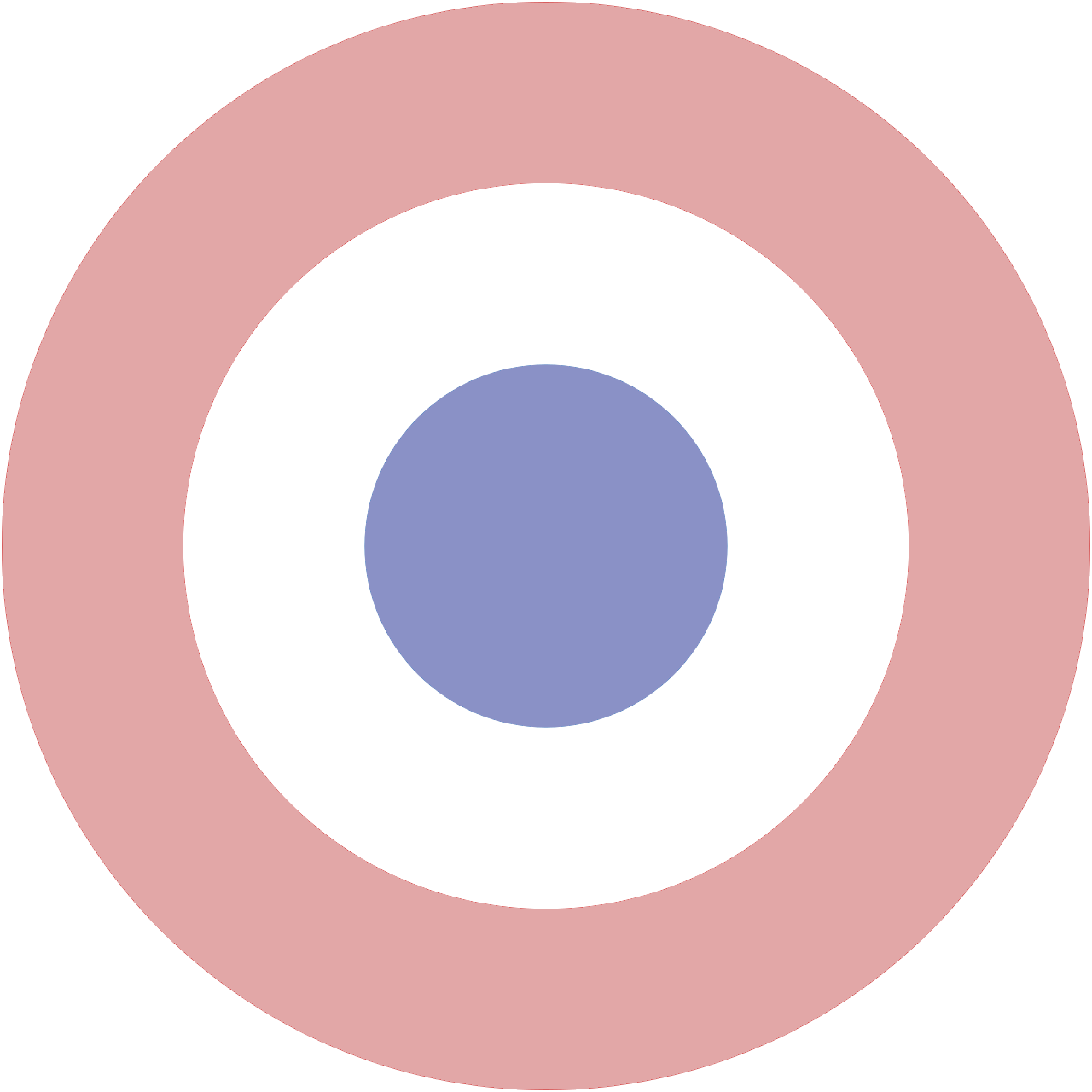
France
(low visibility)

France
(Naval Aviation)

France
(naval aviation,
low visibility)

Gabon

Georgia

Georgia
(low visibility)

Germany

Ghana

Greece

Greece
(low visibility)

Guatemala

Guatemala
(low visibility)

Guinea

Honduras

Hungary

Hungary
(low visibility)

Iceland

India

Indonesia

Indonesia
(low visibility)

Indonesia
(army aviation)

Indonesia
(army aviation,
low visibility)

Indonesia
(naval aviation)

Indonesia
(naval aviation,
low visibility)

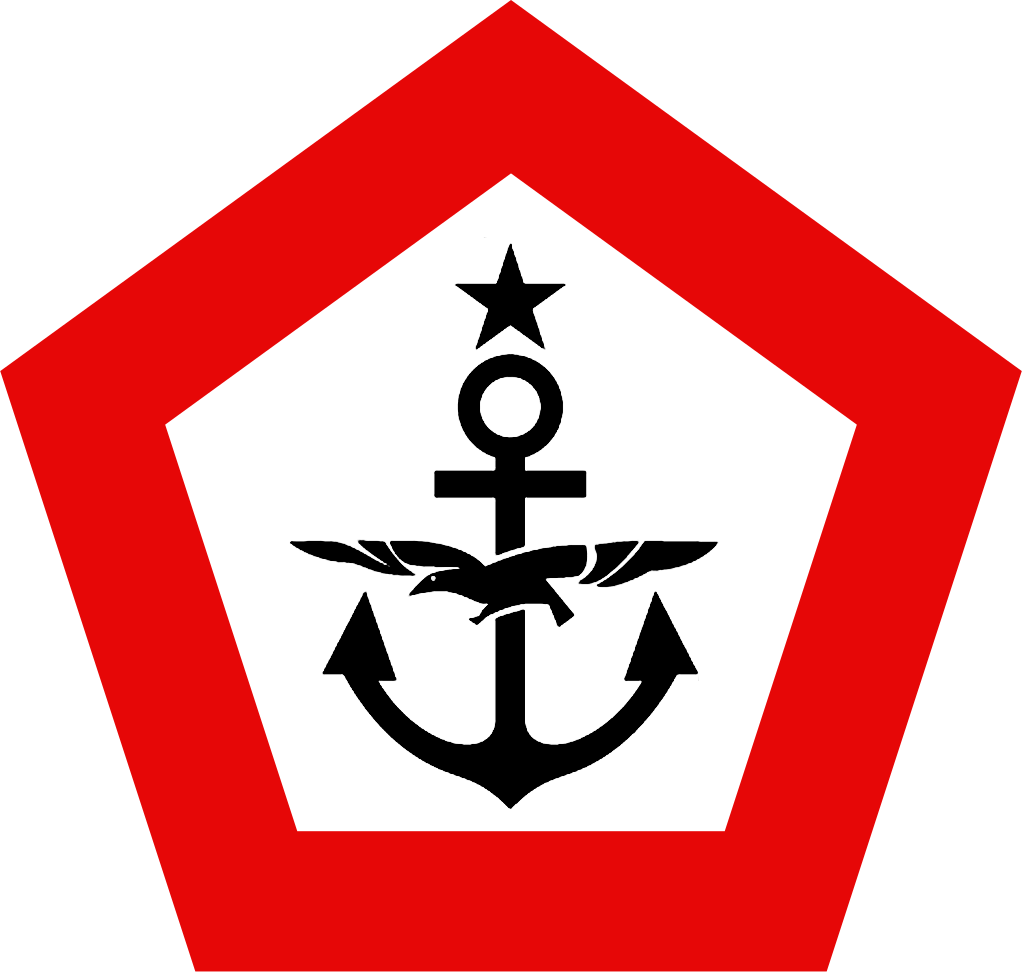
Indonesia
(headquarters)

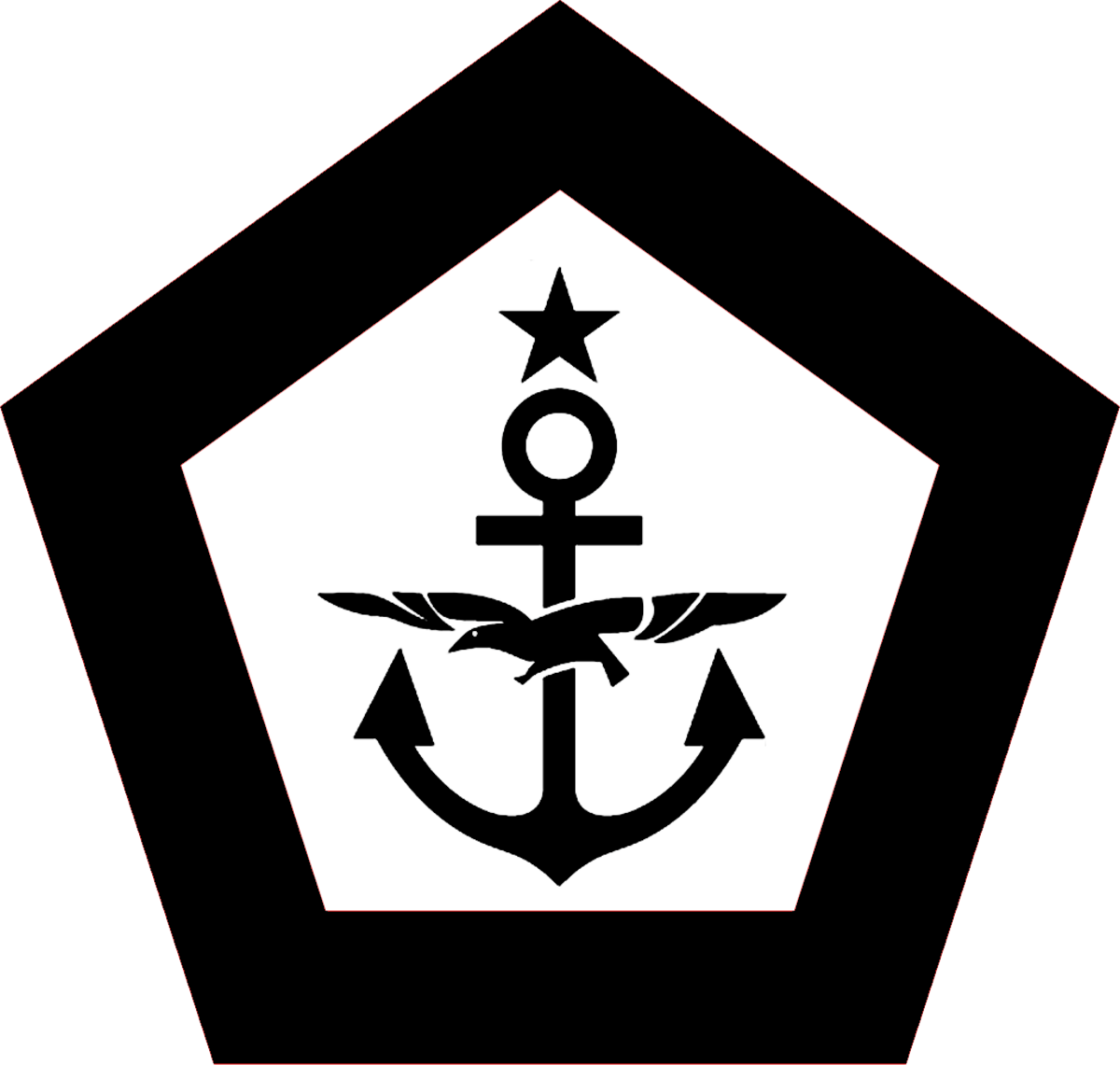
Indonesia
(headquarters,
low visibility)

Iran

Iraq

Ireland

Israel

Israel
(low visibility)

Italy

Italy
(low visibility)

Italy
(low visibility,
alternate)

Italy
(naval aviation)

Jamaica

Japan

Japan
(low visibility)

Jordan

Kazakhstan

Kenya

Kuwait

Kyrgyzstan

Laos

Latvia

Lebanon

Lebanon
(low visibility)

Lesotho

Libya

Liberia

Lithuania

Luxembourg

Madagascar

Malawi

Malaysia

Malaysia
(low visibility)

Malaysia
(alternate)

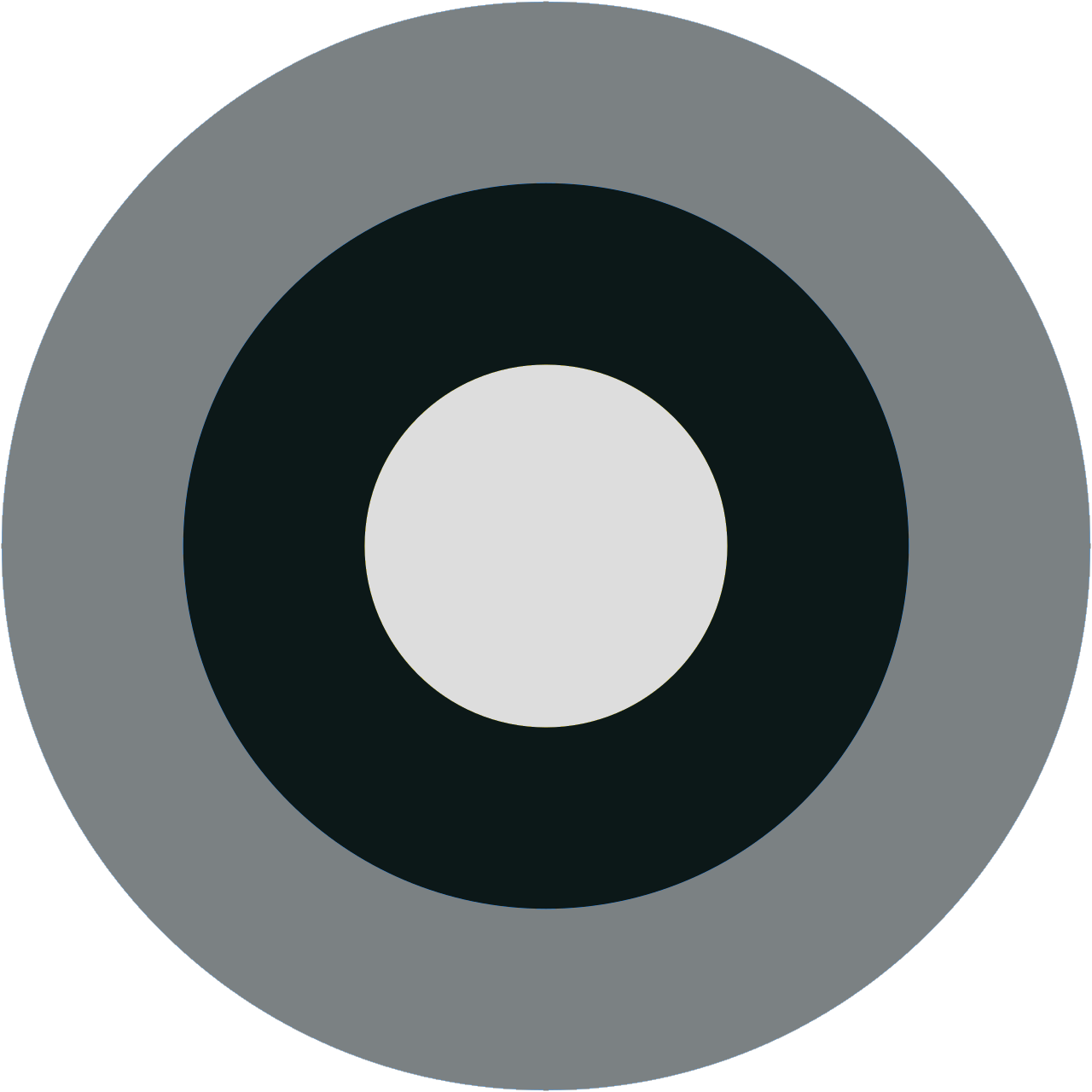
Malaysia
(alternate)
(low visibility)

Malaysia
(naval aviation)

Malaysia
(naval aviation,
low visibility)

Maldives

Mali

Malta

Mauritania

Mauritius

Mexico

Mexico
(low visibility)

Mexican Naval Aviation

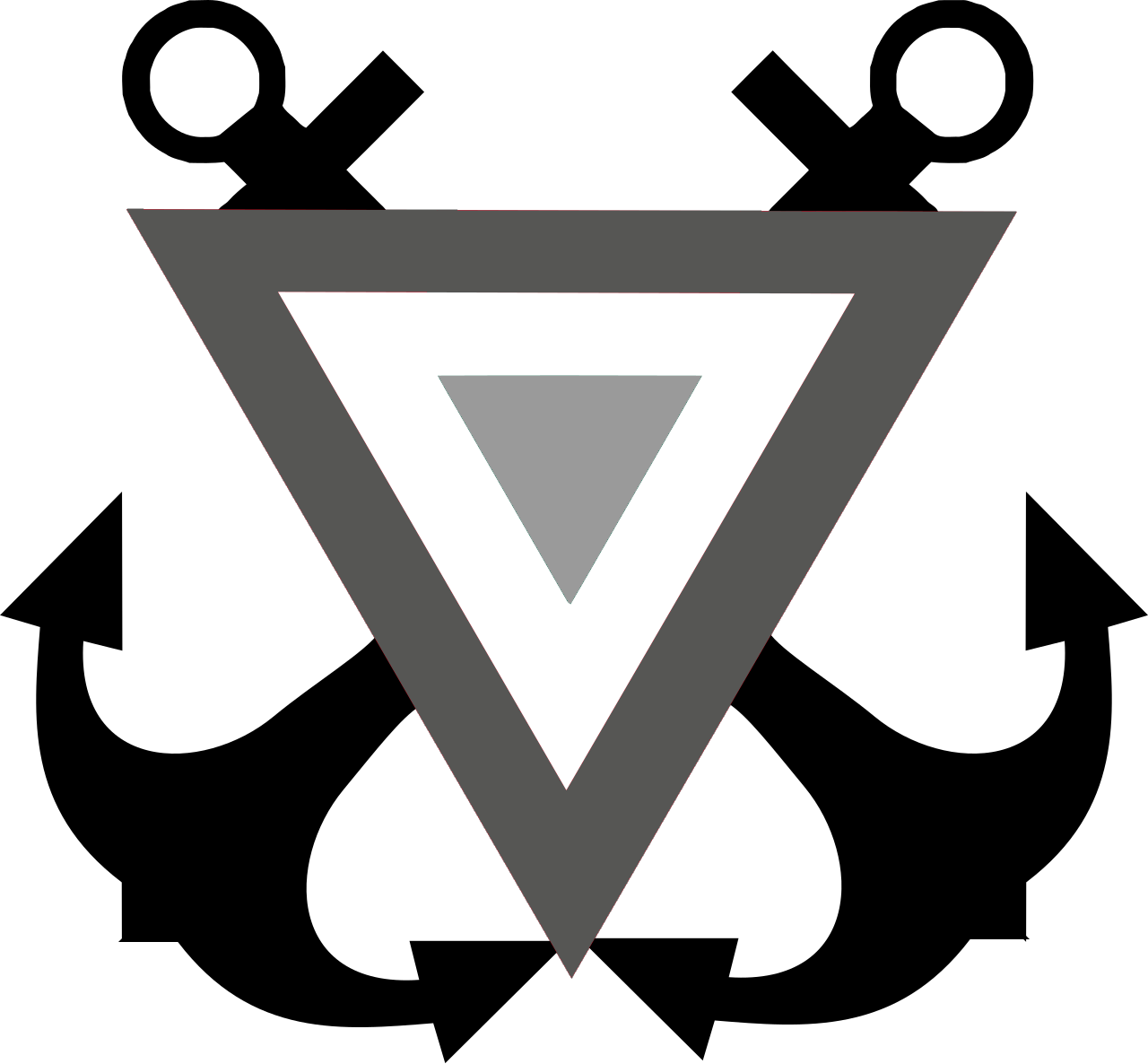
Mexican Naval Aviation
(low visibility)

Moldova

Mongolia

Montenegro

Montenegro
(low visibility)

Morocco

Morocco
(naval aviation)

Mozambique

Myanmar

Nepal

Netherlands

Netherlands
(low visibility)

Netherlands
(low visibility, alternate)

New Zealand

New Zealand
(low visibility)
(variant 1)

New Zealand
(low visibility)
(variant 2)

Nicaragua

Niger

Nigeria

Nigeria
(naval aviation)

North Korea
(variant 1)

North Korea
(variant 2)

North Macedonia

Norway

Norway
(low visibility)

Oman

Pakistan

Pakistan
(low visibility)

Pakistan
(naval air arm)

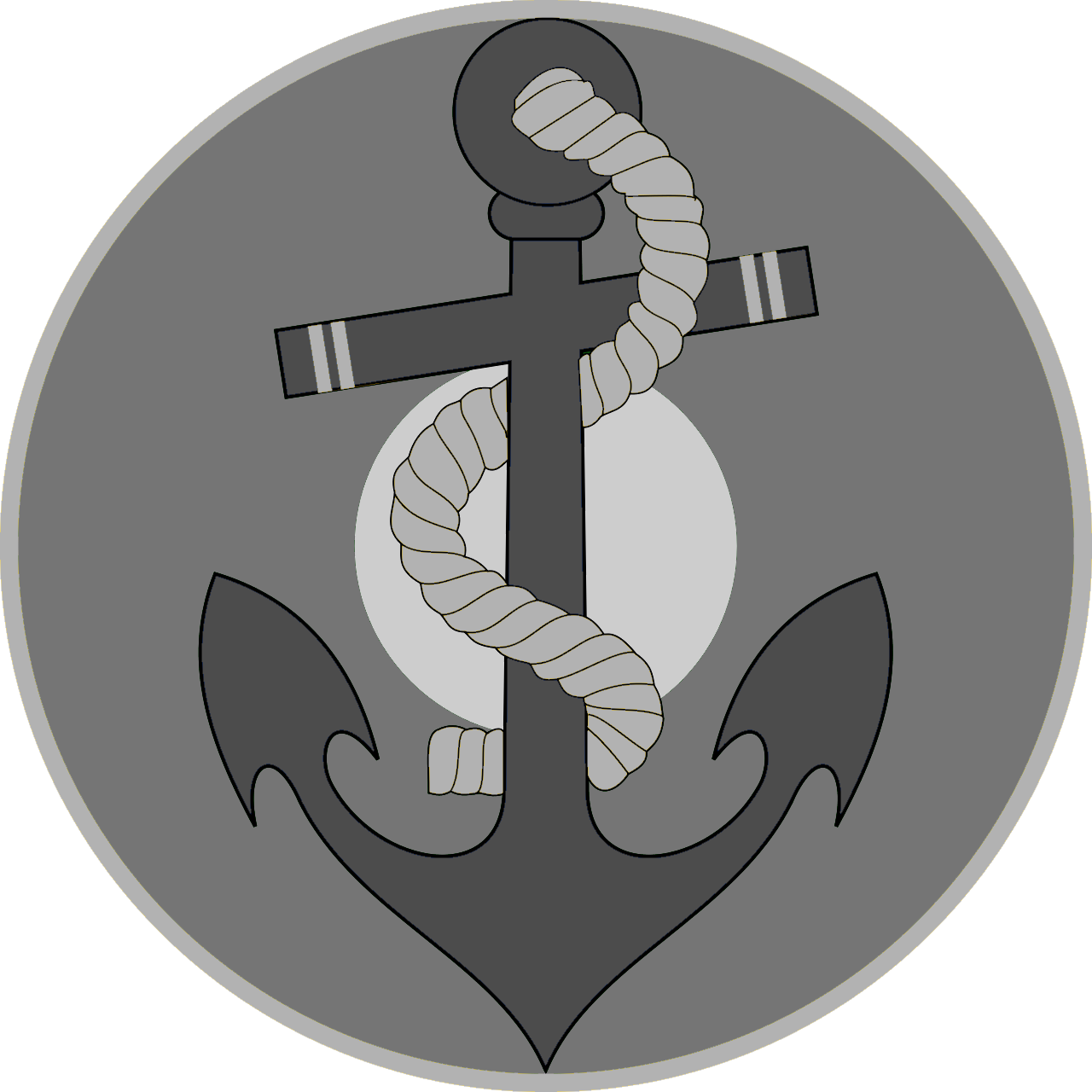
Pakistan
(naval air arm)
(low visibility)

Panama

Panama
(low visibility)

Papua New Guinea

Paraguay

Peru

Peru
(low visibility)

Peru
(naval aviation)

Peru
(naval aviation,
low visibility)

Philippines

Philippines
(low visibility)

Poland

Poland
(low visibility)

Portugal

Portugal
(low visibility)

Qatar

Romania

Romania
(naval aviation)

Russia

Rwanda

Saudi Arabia

Saudi Arabia
(low visibility)

Senegal

Serbia

Serbia
(low visibility)

Seychelles
(Air Force)

Seychelles
(Coast Guard)

Sierra Leone

Slovakia

Slovakia
(low visibility)

Slovenia

Somalia

South Africa

South Africa
(low visibility)

South Korea

South Korea
(low visibility)

South Korea
(naval aviation)

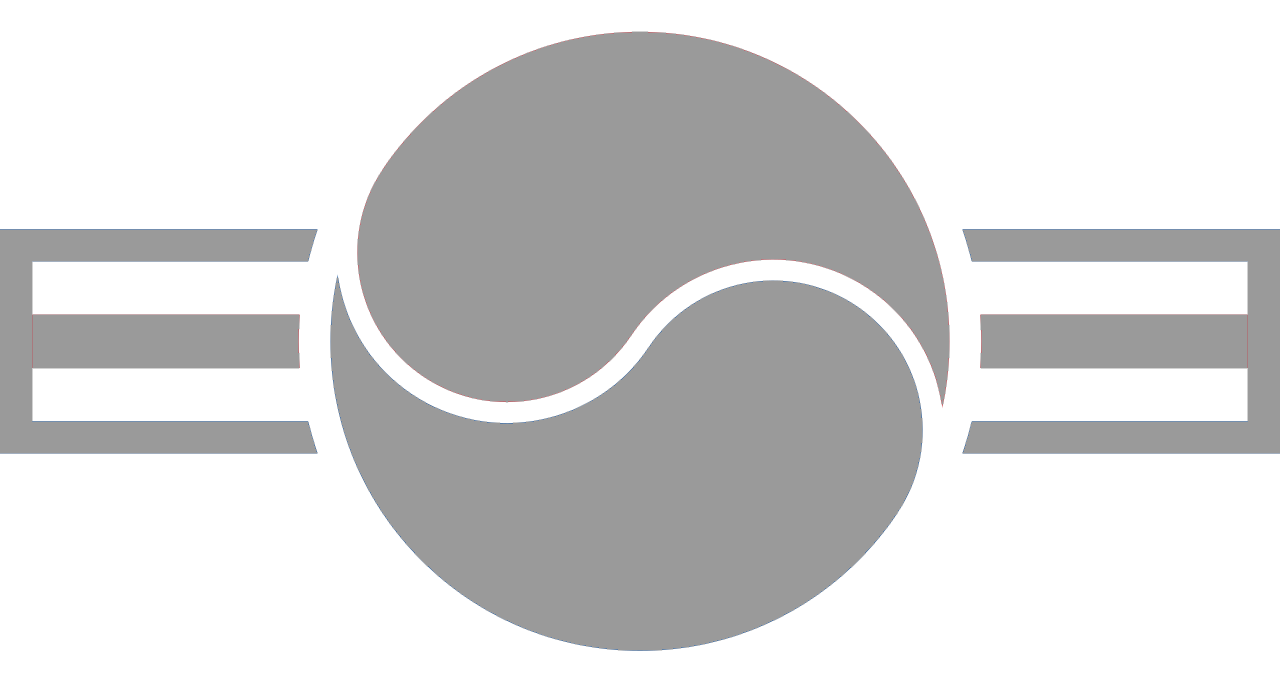
South Korea
(naval aviation)
(low visibility)

South Sudan

Spain

Sri Lanka

Sudan

Suriname

Sweden

Sweden
(low visibility)

Switzerland

Syria

Tajikistan

Thailand

Thailand
(army aviation)

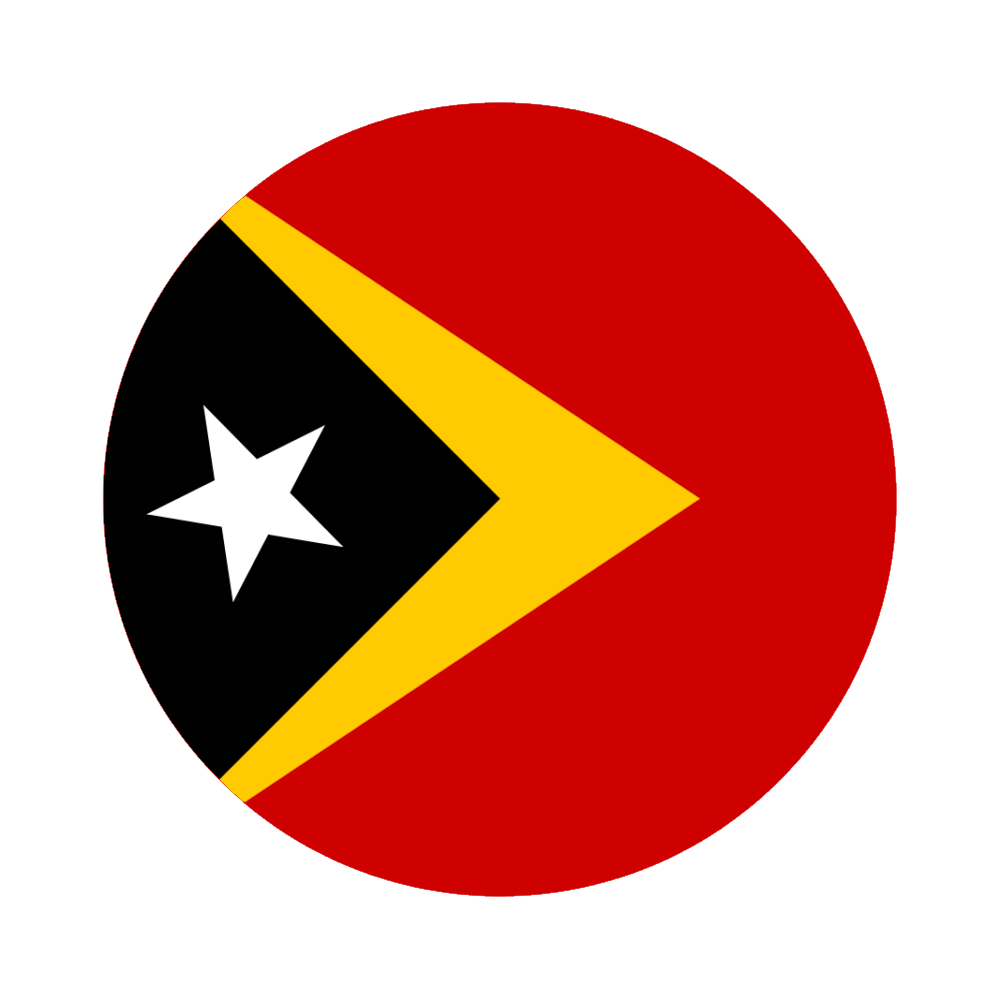
Timor-Leste
(variant 1)

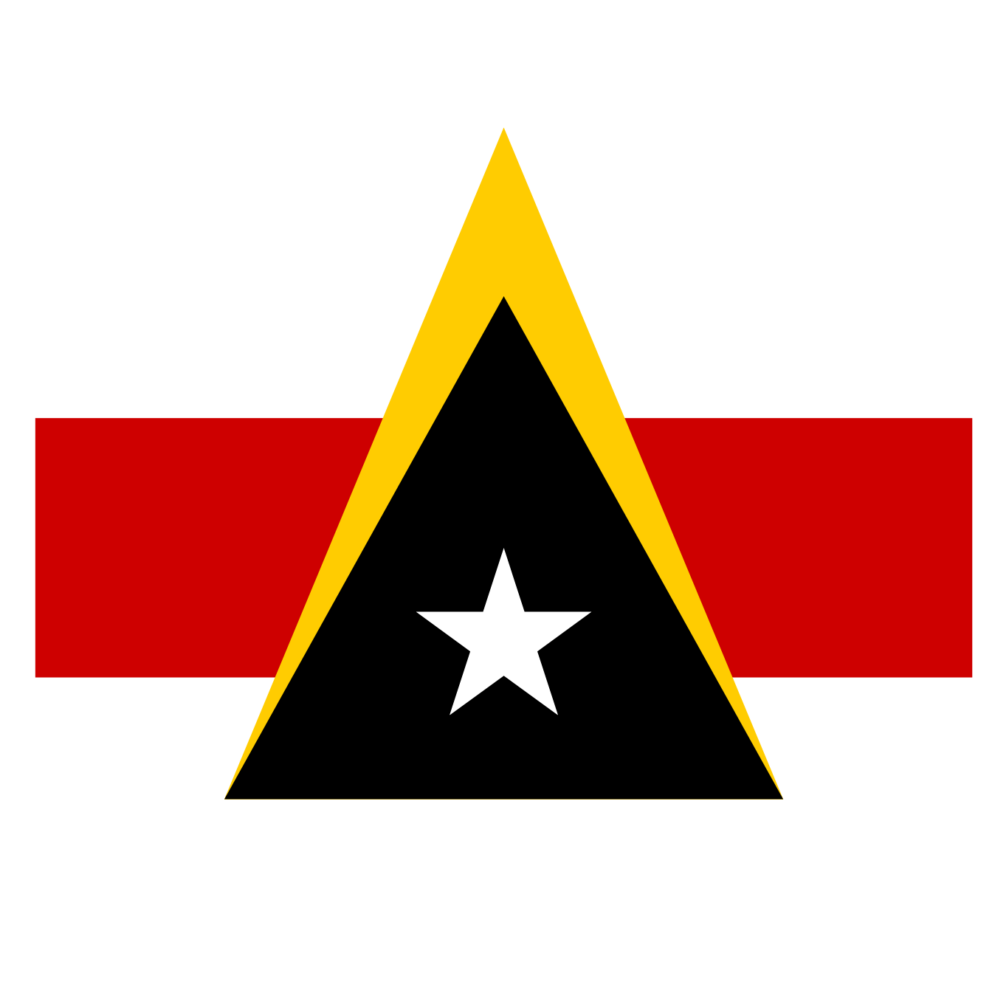
Timor-Leste
(variant 2)

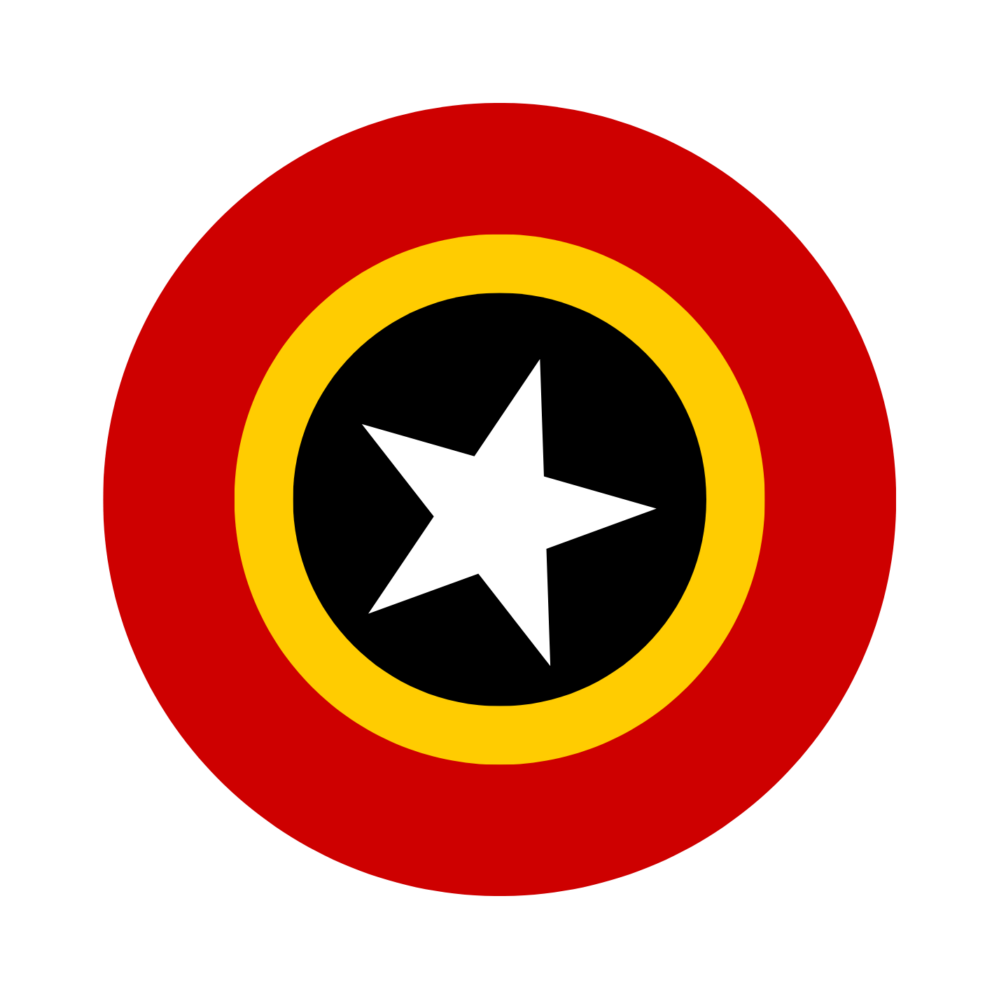
Timor-Leste
(variant 3/alternate)

Togo

Tonga

Transnistria

Trinidad and Tobago

Tunisia

Turkey

Turkey
(low visibility)

Turkey
(Naval Aviation)

Turkmenistan

Uganda

Uganda
(alternate)

Ukraine

Ukraine
(naval aviation)

United Arab Emirates

United Arab Emirates
(low visibility)

United Kingdom

United Kingdom
(low visibility)

United Kingdom
(low visibility, light)

United Kingdom
(low visibility, alternate)

United States

United States
(low visibility)

United States
(low visibility, alternate)

Uruguay

Uruguay
(naval aviation)

Uzbekistan

Venezuela

Venezuela
(naval aviation)

Vietnam

Yemen

Zambia

Zimbabwe

=== Government insignia ===
International Symbol of Civil Defence

United Nations

NATO

Hong Kong Government Flying Service

Macau Civil Aviation Authority

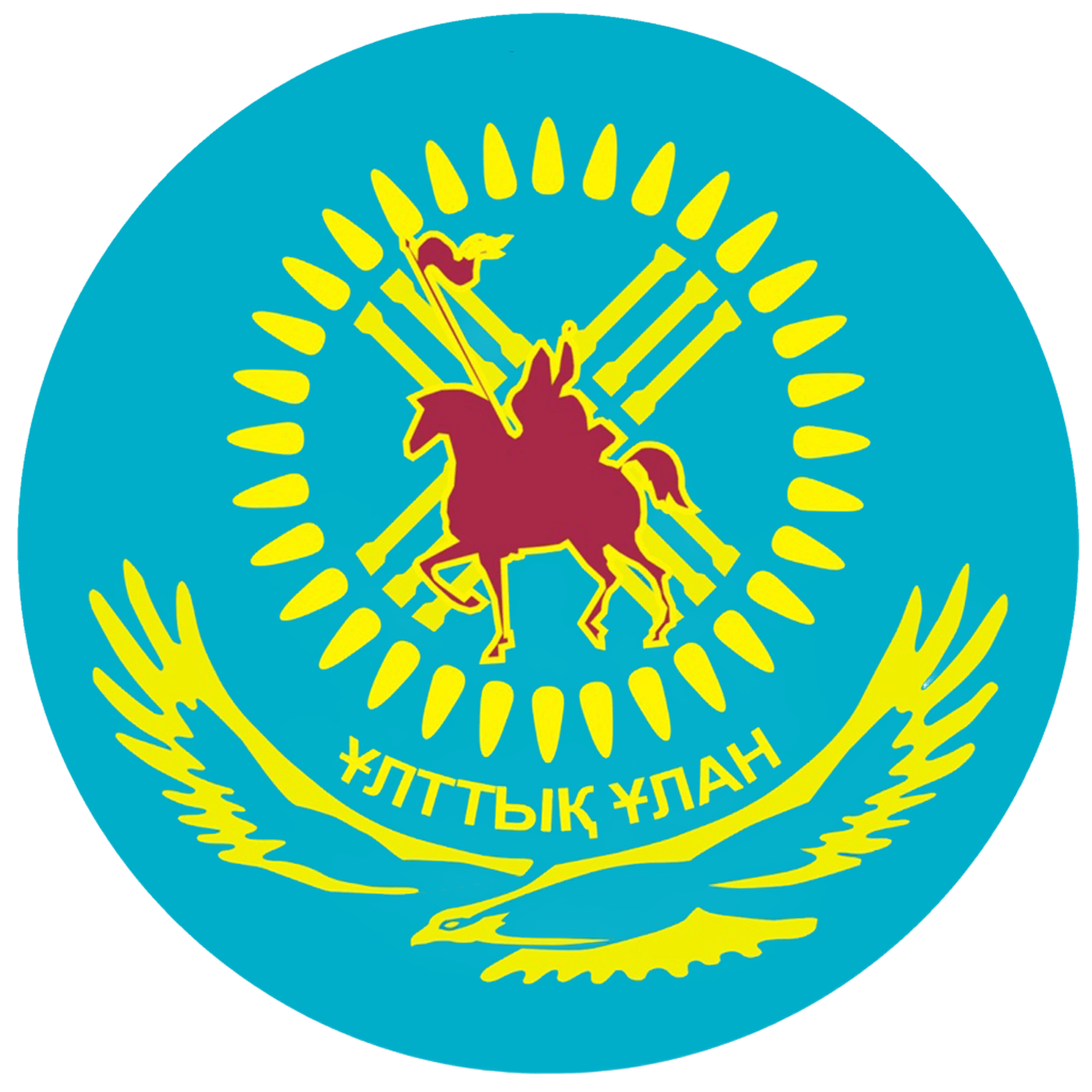
Kazakhstan
National Guard

Kazakhstan
Border Guard

Polish
Border Guard

US Coast Guard

United States Air Force Civil Air Patrol

=== Former insignia of national air forces ===
Abkhazia
(variant 1)

Abkhazia
(variant 2)

Abkhazia
(variant 3)

Emirate of Abu Dhabi
(1968–1976)

Afghanistan
(1924–1928)

Kingdom of Afghanistan
(1929–1965)

Afghanistan
(1965–1978)
(variant 1)

Afghanistan
(1965–1978)
(variant 2)

Democratic Republic of Afghanistan
(1979–1983)

Democratic Republic of Afghanistan
(1983–1992)

Islamic State of Afghanistan
(1992–2002)

Islamic Republic of Afghanistan
(2010–2021)

Islamic Republic of Afghanistan
(2010–2021)
(army aviation)

People's Socialist Republic of Albania
(1946-1958)

People's Socialist Republic of Albania
(1958-1960)

People's Socialist Republic of Albania
(1960-1992)

People's Socialist Republic of Albania
(1960-1992)
(variant 2)

Algeria
(1962–1964)

Angola
(1975–1980)

Angola
(1980–2011)

Argentina
(naval aviation)

Australia
(1942–1943)

Australia
(1943–1946)

Austro-Hungarian Empire
(1914–1916)

Austro-Hungarian Empire
(1916)

Austro-Hungarian Empire
(1918)

Bahrain
(1972–2002)

Belgium
(1914)

People's Republic of Benin
(1975–1990)

Republic of Biafra
(1967–1970)

Bophuthatswana
(1987–1994)

Brazilian Air Force
(1943–1945)

Kingdom of Bulgaria
(1915–1918)

Kingdom of Bulgaria
(1938–1941)

Kingdom of Bulgaria
(1941–1944)

Kingdom of Bulgaria
(1944–1946)

People's Republic of Bulgaria
(1946–1992)

State of Cambodia
(1989–1993)
(variant 1)

State of Cambodia
(1989–1993)
(variant 2)

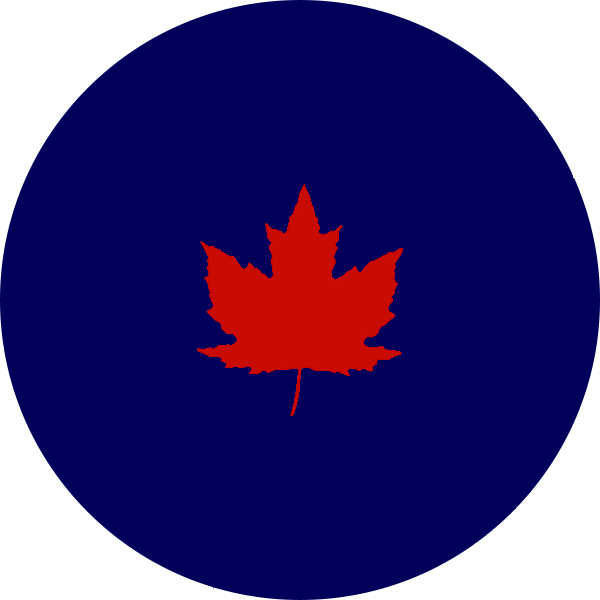
Canada
(1945–1946)

Canada
(1946–1965)

Canada
(1967 Centennial)

Central Lithuania
(1920–1922)
(left wing variant)

Central Lithuania
(1920–1922)
(right wing variant)

Republic of China
(1916–1920)

Republic of China
(1920–1928)

Republic of China
(naval aviation,
1927–1938)

Wang Jingwei regime
(1940–1945)

Republic of China (Taiwan)
(1928–1991)

Communist China Air Force
(1946–1949)

Communist China Air Force
(1946–1949)

Communist China Air Force
(1946–1949)

Colombia
(1927–1953)

People's Republic of Congo

Democratic Republic of the Congo
(1960-1964)

Democratic Republic of the Congo
(1964-1972)

Costa Rica
(early 1940s-1949)

Costa Rica
(1964–1994)

Independent State of Croatia
(1941)

Independent State of Croatia
(1941–1945)

Croatia
(1991–1994)

Cuba
(1955–1959)

Cuba
(1959–1962)

Czechoslovakia
(1918–1920)

Czechoslovakia

Danish Brigade in Sweden
(1943-1945)

Djibouti
(1977)

Dominican Republic
(1947-1950)

Kingdom of Egypt
(1939–1945)

Kingdom of Egypt
(1945–1958)

Egypt
(1958–1972)

Eritrea
(1994-2000)

Ethiopian Empire

Finland
(1918–1945)

Free France
(type 1)

Free France
(type 2)

German Empire
(1914–1918)

German Empire
(1918)

German Empire
(1918)

Germany
(1935–1945)

Germany
(alternate,
1935-1945)

Germany
(alternate,
1935-1945)

Germany
(low visibility,
1942–1945)

East Germany
(1955–1959)

East Germany
(1959–1990)

East Germany
(Border Troops)

Ghana
(1964–1966)

Guinea-Bissau

Haiti
(1942–1964)

Haiti
(1964–1986)

Haiti
(1986–1994)

Hungarian Soviet Republic
(1919)

Kingdom of Hungary
(1938–1941)

Kingdom of Hungary
(1942–1945)

Second Hungarian Republic
(1948–1949)

Hungarian People's Republic
(1949–1951)

Hungarian People's Republic
(1951–1990)

Hungary
(1990–1991)

British India
(1943–1945)

India
(1947–1950)

Indonesia
(1946–1949)

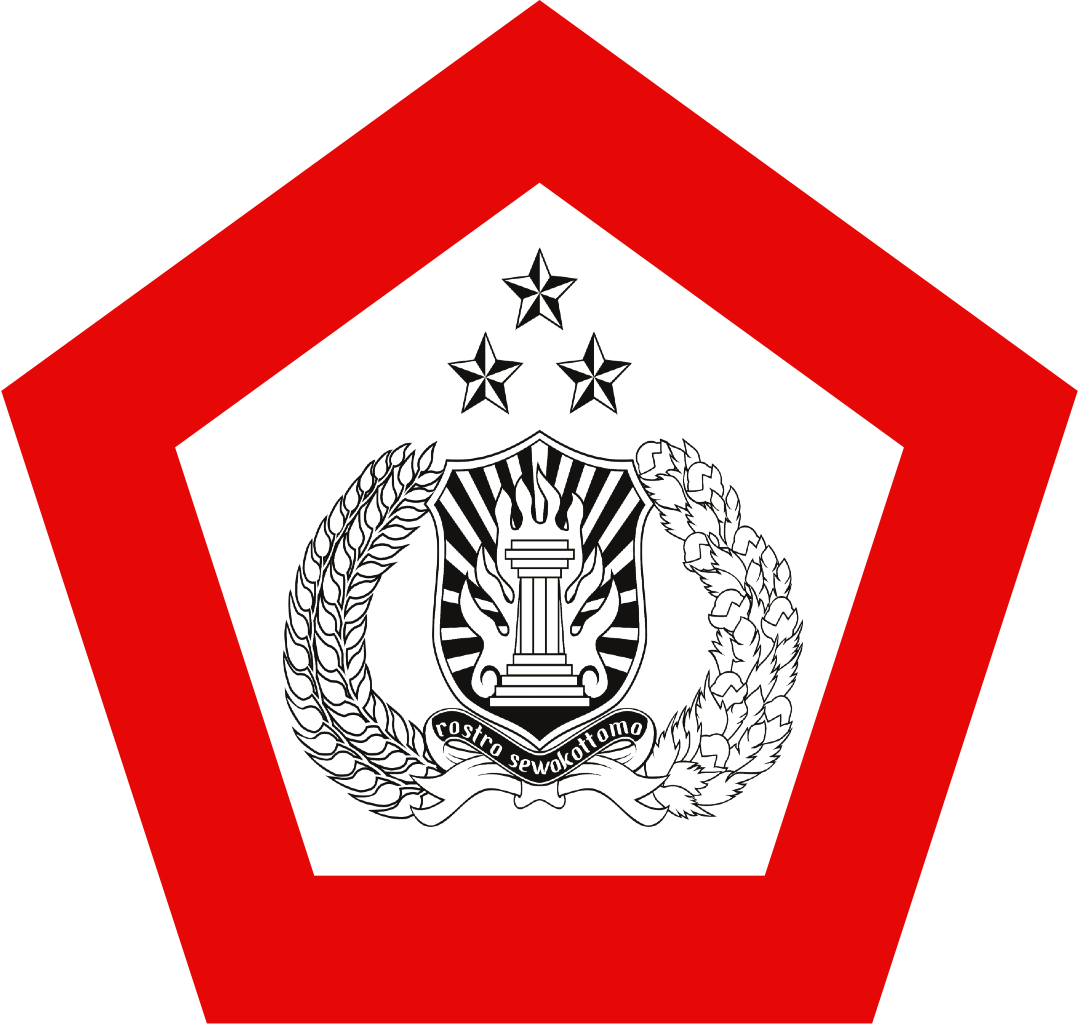
Indonesia
(police aviation)

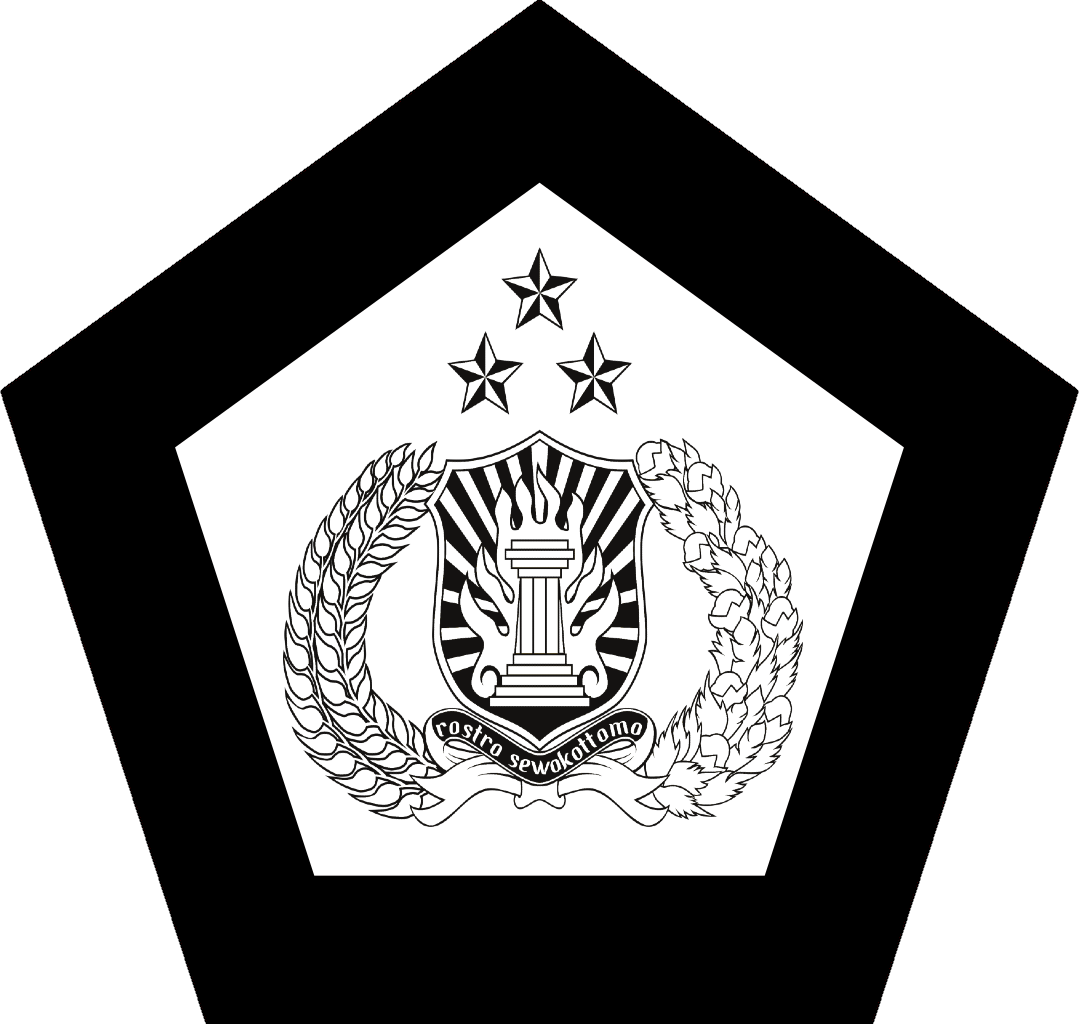
Indonesia
(police aviation,
low visibility)

Iraq
(1931–2003)

Iraq
(2008–2019)

Ireland
(1939–1954)

Fascist Italy

Italian Social Republic

Japan
(1915-1999)

Japan
(1915-1999)
(low visibility)

Democratic Kampuchea
(1976–1979)

People's Republic of Kampuchea
(1979–1989)
(variant 1)

People's Republic of Kampuchea
(1979–1989)
(variant 2)

Katanga

Khmer Republic
(1970–1975)

Kingdom of Laos
(1955–1975)

Latvia
(1918–1940)

Latvia
(National Guard)
(1993–2000)

Kingdom of Libya
(1962–1969)

Libyan Arab Republic
(1969–1977)

Great Socialist People's Libyan Arab Jamahiriya
(1977–2011)

Free Libyan Air Force
(2011–2014)

Lithuania
(1919-1920)

Lithuania
(1920-1921)

Malagasy Republic

Malaysia
(1963–1982)

Malta
(1980–1988)

Manchukuo
(Air Force)

Manchukuo
(Air Transport)

Mauritania
(1960-2019)

Mongolian People's Republic

Montenegro
(2006–2018)

Mozambique
(1975–2011)

Niger
(1961-1980)

Netherlands
(1914–1921)

Netherlands
(1939–1940)

New Zealand
(1943–1946)

Nicaragua
(1962–1979)
(wing)

Nicaragua
(1962–1979)
(fuselage)

North Vietnam
(1955–1965)

North Yemen
(1957–1962)

North Yemen
(1962–1990)

Norway
(1914–1940)

Oman
(1965–1970)
(1977–1983)

Oman
(1965–1970)
(1977–1983)
(alternate)

Ottoman Empire
(Air Squadrons)

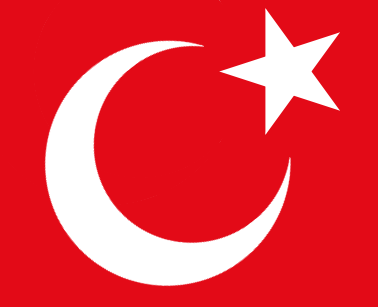
Ottoman Empire
(Naval Aviation)

Philippines
(1936-1942)
(1945-1947)

Poland
(1918-1921)

Poland
(1921–1993)
(variant 1)

Poland
(1921–1993)
(variant 2)

Portugal
(1914-1918)

(Southern) Rhodesia
(1939–1954)

Rhodesia
(Federation of Rhodesia & Nyasaland)
(1954–1963)

(Southern) Rhodesia
(1963–1970)

Rhodesia
(1970–1980)

Kingdom of Romania
(during World War I)

Kingdom of Romania
(1941–1944)

Socialist Republic of Romania
(1947–1985)

Russian Empire
(1912–1917)

Russia
(1991–2010)

Serbia
(1912-1915)

Serbia
(1915-1918)

Seychelles
(1978)

Singapore
(1968–1973)

Singapore
(1973–1990)

Slovak Republic
(1940–1945)

Slovak Resistance
(1944)

Slovenia
(1991–1996)

Union of South Africa
(1920–1921)

Union of South Africa
(1921–1927)

Union of South Africa
(1927–1947)

Union of South Africa
(1947–1957)

South Africa
(1957–1994)

South Africa
(1994–2003)

Federation of South Arabia

South Korea
(1949–2005)

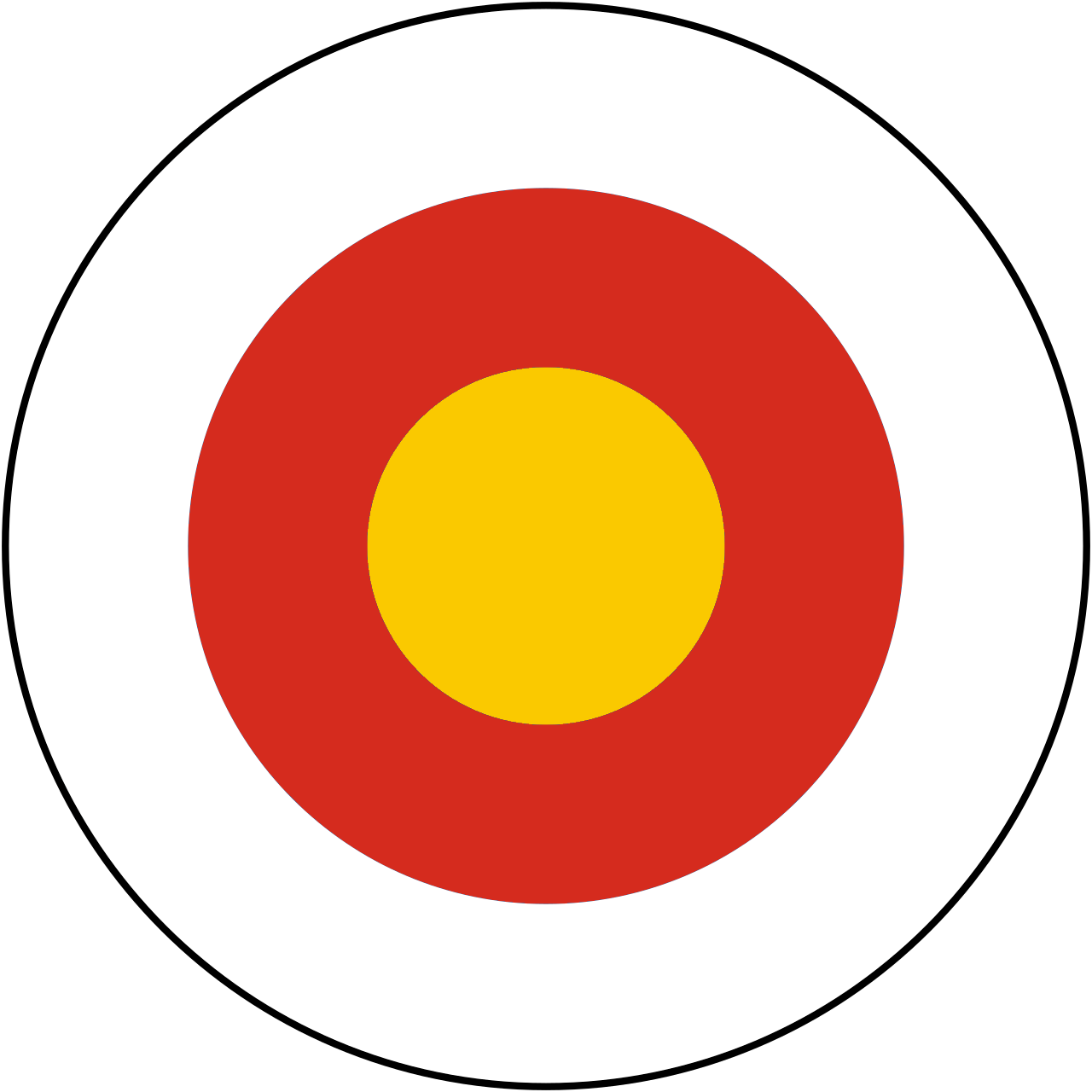
South Ossetia

South Vietnam
(1951–1956)

South Vietnam
(1956–1975)

South Yemen
(1968–1980)

South Yemen
(1980–1990)

Sovereign Military Order of Malta

Somalia

Second Spanish Republic
(1936–1939)

Spanish State
(1936–1939)

Spanish State
(wing)

Spanish State
(fuselage)

Sri Lanka
(1951–2010)

Republika Srpska
(variant 1)

Republika Srpska
(variant 2)

Sudan
(1956–1970)

Sweden
(1914–1915)

Sweden
(1927–1937)

Sweden
(1937–1940)

Switzerland
(1914–1947)

Syria
(1948–1958)

Syria
(1963–1972)

Syria
(1972–1980)

Syria
(1980–2024)

Tanzania
(1965–2010)

Tanzania
(2010-2019)

Thailand
(1940–1941)

Thailand
(1941–1945)

Turkey
(1918–1972)

Turkmenistan
(1991-2011)

USSR
(1922–1943)

USSR
(1943–1991)

Uganda
(1962–2009)

Ukraine
(1991)

United Arab Emirates
(1971–1976)

United Kingdom
(1915–1929)

United Kingdom
(1929–1938)

United Kingdom
(1937–1942)

United Kingdom
(1942–1947)

United Kingdom
Asia-Pacific Front
(1942–1946)

United Kingdom
(naval aviation,
1944–1945)

United Kingdom
(naval aviation,
1944–1945)

United States
(1915–1917)

United States
(1917–1918)

United States
(1918–1919)

United States
(1919–1942)

United States
(1942–1943)

United States
(1943)

United States
(1943–1947)

Upper Volta

Venda

Kingdom of Yugoslavia
(1923–1929)

Kingdom of Yugoslavia
(1929–1941)

DF Yugoslavia
(1943–1946)

DF Yugoslavia
(1943–1946)
(fuselage 1)

DF Yugoslavia
(1943–1946)
(fuselage 2)

SFR Yugoslavia
(1945–1991)

Serbia and Montenegro (FR Yugoslavia)
(1992–2006)

Zaire
(1972–1997)
(variant 1)

Zaire
(1972–1997)
(variant 2)

Zambia
(1964–1996)

== See also ==
- Aircraft recognition
- Cockade
- List of air forces
- Nose art

== Bibliography ==
- Robertson, Bruce (1967). Aircraft Markings of the World 1912–1967. Letchworth, England: Harleyford Publications.
