= Fuji/Rockwell Commander 700 =

Twin-engine general aviation aircraft

Commander 700
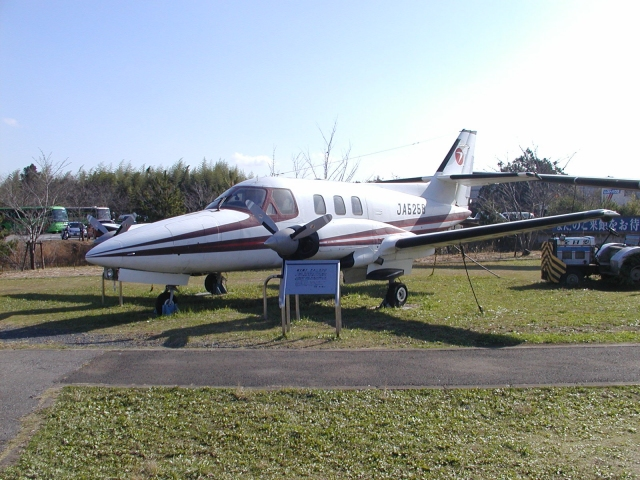

General information
- Type: Cargo
- Manufacturer: Fuji Heavy Industries / Rockwell International
- Status: Active
- Number built: 49

History
- Manufactured: 1975-1979
- First flight: 1975

The Fuji/Rockwell Commander 700 is a light transport aircraft which was a joint Japanese-American development between Fuji Heavy Industries and Rockwell International. When Rockwell sold off the general aviation division the agreement was terminated.

== Design and development ==
Design of the Commander 700 started in Japan in 1971 with the designation FA-300, and on 28 June 1974 Fuji signed a collaboration with Rockwell International to design and develop the aircraft as a joint venture. The aircraft was designated the Commander 700 for the North American market. The Commander 700 is a low-wing cantilever monoplane with a conventional tail unit and a retractable tricycle landing gear. The aircraft is powered by two wing mounted Avco Lycoming turbocharged piston engines. The fuselage was designed to be pressurized with accommodation for two crew and four–six passengers. The first prototype made its maiden flight at Fuji's Utsunomiya factory on 13 November 1975 and the second aircraft, assembled by Rockwell, flew at Bethany, Oklahoma on 25 February 1976. A parallel development was the Commander 710 with more powerful engines which first flew on 22 December 1976. In 1979 Rockwell International sold its General Aviation Division to Gulfstream American and the agreement with Fuji was terminated. Fuji then acquired the worldwide manufacturing and marketing rights for the aircraft.

== Variants ==
Commander 700
Powered by two 340hp (254kW) Avco Lycoming TIO-540-R2AD engines.
Commander 710
Powered by two 450hp (335kW) Avco Lycoming TIGO-541 engines.

== Specifications (700) ==
Data from The Illustrated Encyclopedia of Aircraft (Part Work 1982-1985), 1985, Orbis Publishing, Page 1920

General characteristics

- Crew: 2
- Capacity: 4 or 5 passengers
- Length: 39 ft 5.75 in (12.03 m)
- Wingspan: 42 ft 5.5 in (12.94 m)
- Height: 13 ft 3.5 in (4.05 m)
- Wing area: 200.2 sq ft (18.60 m^{2})
- Empty weight: 4,704 lb (2,134 kg)
- Gross weight: 6,947 lb (3,151 kg)
- Powerplant: 2 × Avco Lycoming TIO-540-R2AD flat-six piston engine , 340 hp (254 kW) each

Performance

- Maximum speed: 254 mph (409 km/h, 221 kn)
- Range: 1,384 mi (2,227 km, 1,203 nmi)
- Service ceiling: 27,400 ft (8,350 m)

== See also ==
Aircraft of comparable role, configuration, and era

- Aero Commander 500 family
- Cessna T303 Crusader
- Cessna 340
- Beech Queen Air
- Piper Navajo
