= Djibouti Air Force =

Air warfare branch of Djibouti's military

Djiboutian Air Force
- Forces Aériennes Djiboutiennes; Ciidanka Cirka Jabuuti
- Emblem of the Djiboutian Armed Force
- Founded: 1977; 48 years ago
- Country: Djibouti
- Type: Air force
- Part of: Djibouti Armed Forces
- Headquarters: Ambouli International
- Engagements: AU Mission in Somalia

Insignia
- Roundel

- Fin flash

Aircraft flown
- Helicopter: Mil Mi-8, AS355, AS365, Harbin Z-9, Mil Mi-24
- Transport: Xian MA60, C-23 Sherpa, Cessna 208

The Djiboutian Air Force (DAF) (French: Forces Aériennes Djiboutiennes (FADD)), (Somali: Ciidanka Cirka Jabuuti) is the Air Force of Djibouti. It was established as part of the Djibouti Armed Forces after the country obtained its independence on June 27, 1977. Its peacetime tasks are airspace surveillance, border patrols, identification flights, and providing support to ground forces, as well as assisting civil operations during national emergencies. The first aircraft included three Nord N.2501 Noratlas transport aircraft, as well as a French Aérospatiale Alouette II helicopter.

The DAF is mandated with protecting Djibouti's airspace, and in assisting ground forces.

== History ==
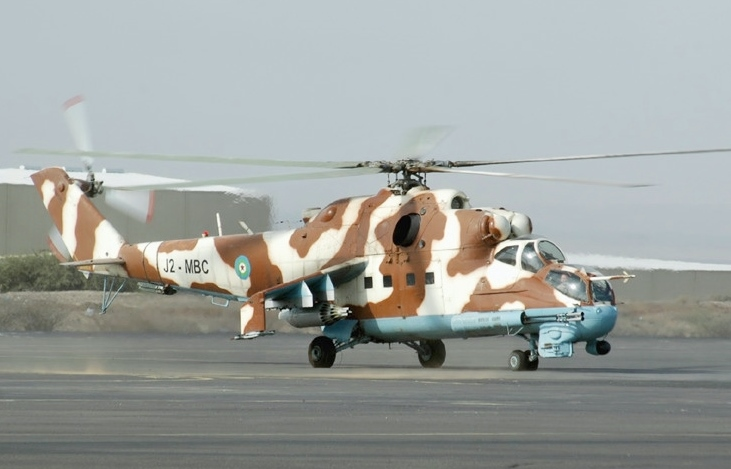
A Djiboutian Mi-35 on the taxi way

Djibouti gained independence in 1977, but its first air bases had been set up in 1932 by the French Air Force. Following an agreement signed between the Djiboutian and French governments in 1978, Djiboutian airmen began training in French with the assistance of French technical staff and pilots. In 1982, the Djibouti Air Force was augmented by two Eurocopter AS355 Écureuil 2 helicopters and a Cessna 206 followed in 1985 by a Cessna 402C Utiliner. In 1985 the Aérospatiale Alouette III was withdrawn from use and put on display at Ambouli Air Base as Djibouti's airport is called. Two years later, the three Nord Noratlas were also put aside and given back to France later. New equipment came in 1991 by means of a Cessna 208 Caravan followed by all the Russian types in the early nineties. They included four Mi 2, six Mi 8 and two Mi 17 helicopters and a single Antonov An-28 light transport aircraft.

Djiboutian airmen were sent abroad to train in countries such as France, the United States, Soviet Union, Egypt and Morocco. After their training, many of these men went on to become the nation's leading instructors and pilots.

As of 2018, the Air Force had a strength of 360 personnel, and operated a small number of transport aircraft and helicopters.

== Aircraft ==
Aircraft	Origin	Type	Variant	In service	Notes
Transport
Cessna 208	United States	Utility		1	
Harbin Y-12	China	Utility		2	
Xi'an MA60	China	Transport	MA60H-500	2	
Helicopters
Eurocopter AS355	France	Utility		1	
Eurocopter AS565	France	Utility		4	
Harbin Z-9	China	Utility		1	
Mil Mi-8	Russia	Transport / Utility		2	
Mil Mi-24	Russia	Attack	Mil Mi-35	2	
UAV
Bayraktar TB2	Turkey	UCAV		Unknown	

=== Drones ===
Djibouti owns unmanned aerial vehicles, including attack, surveillance, and reconnaissance. In 2022, Djibouti purchased unknown number of the Turkish Bayraktar TB2.
