= Cessna T303 Crusader =

American light twin-engine aircraft

T303 Crusader
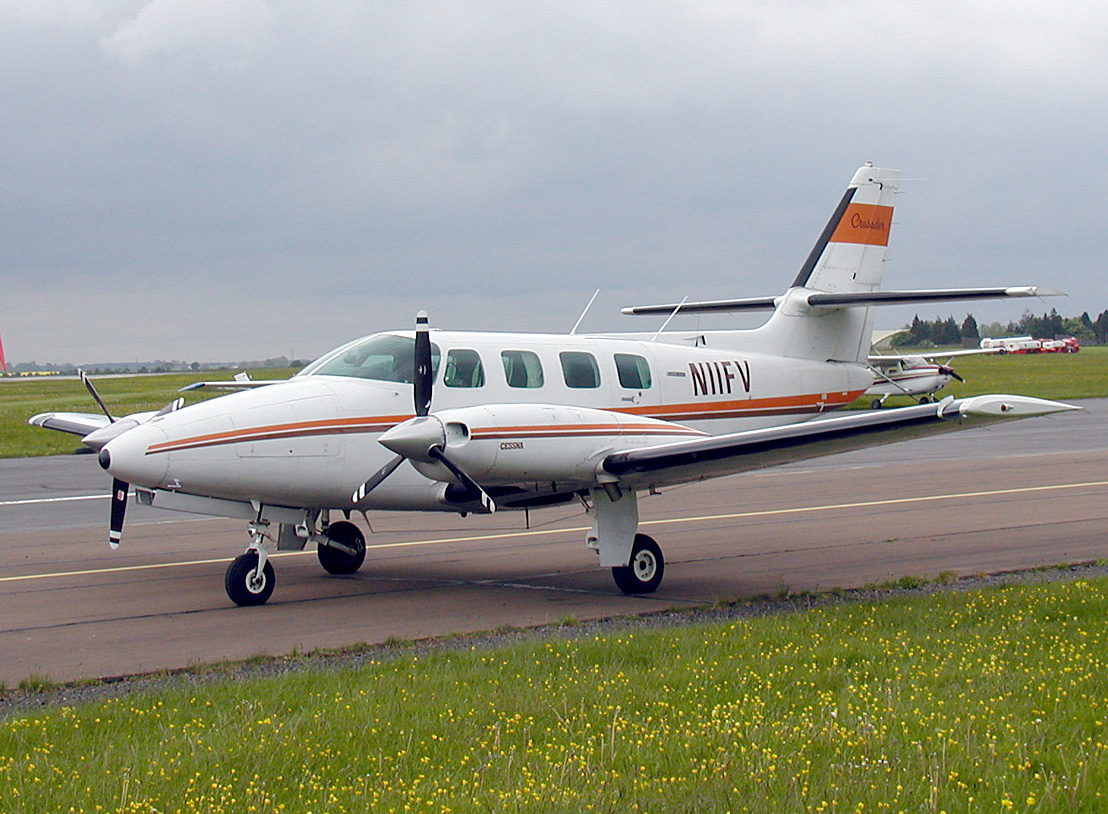
- Cessna T303 Crusader

General information
- Type: Six-seat twin engine cabin monoplane
- National origin: United States
- Manufacturer: Cessna Aircraft Company
- Number built: 297

History
- Introduction date: 1982
- First flight: February 14, 1978

The Cessna T303 Crusader is an American six-place light twin-engined aircraft built by Cessna Aircraft Company. Production ceased in 1986.

== Design and development ==
The original Cessna 303 Clipper was first flown on February 14, 1978; it was a low-wing four-seat Lycoming-powered twin-engined aircraft that would have competed with the Piper Seminole, Gulfstream American GA-7 Cougar, and Beechcraft Duchess. After market demand for four-place light twins declined, only one 303 Clipper was built before Cessna redesigned the aircraft as a six-seat twin. They also renamed the aircraft out of legal concern, since Pan Am Airlines held the trademark on the name "Clipper" in reference to their fleet aircraft.

The new model, designated the T303 Crusader first flew on October 17, 1979, with the first deliveries being made in October, 1981. The T303 is an all-metal low-wing six-seat twin-engined aircraft with a retractable tricycle undercarriage. At the time, it was the first all-new production twin built by Cessna in over a decade. With a declining market, only 297 were built.

Examples were exported to Europe, with several still operating in the United Kingdom in 2012 and two flying in Goondiwindi, Queensland, Australia. Many are still flying in Colombia in air taxi and private operations.

== Operators ==
=== Military operators ===
Haiti
Haiti Air Corps
Guatemala
Armed Forces of Guatemala

== Specifications (T303) ==
Data from Jane's All The World's Aircraft 1982–83

General characteristics

- Crew: One
- Capacity: Five passengers
- Length: 30 ft 5 in (9.27 m)
- Wingspan: 39 ft 0 1/2 in (11.900 m)
- Height: 13 ft 4 in (4.06 m)
- Wing area: 189.2 sq ft (17.58 m^{2})
- Airfoil: NACA 23017 (root), NACA 23012 (tip)
- Empty weight: 3,305 lb (1,499 kg)
- Gross weight: 5,150 lb (2,336 kg)
- Fuel capacity: 153 US gal (127 imp gal; 580 L) (usable capacity)
- Powerplant: 2 × Continental TSIO-520-AE/LTSIO-520-AE turbocharged air-cooled flat-six piston engine, 250 hp (190 kW) each
- Propellers: 3-bladed McCauley 3AF32C506/82NEB-8 and 3AF32C507/L82NEB-8 counter rotating constant-speed propellers, 6 ft 10 in (2.08 m) diameter

Performance

- Maximum speed: 249 mph (401 km/h, 216 kn) at 18,000 ft (5,500 m)
- Cruise speed: 226 mph (364 km/h, 196 kn) at 20,000 ft (6,100 m) (max cruise, 71% power)
- Stall speed: 71.5 mph (115.1 km/h, 62.1 kn) (CAS), flaps down, power off
- Range: 1,174 mi (1,889 km, 1,020 nmi) econ cruise at 10,000 ft (3,000 m) 45 min reserves
- Service ceiling: 25,000 ft (7,600 m)
- Rate of climb: 1,480 ft/min (7.5 m/s)
- Takeoff distance from 50 ft (15m): 1,750 ft (530 m)
- Landing distance from 50 ft (15m): 1,450 ft (440 m)

== See also ==
Aircraft of comparable role, configuration, and era

- Beechcraft Baron
- Fuji/Rockwell Commander 700
- Cessna 310
- Piper Aztec
- Piper PA-34 Seneca
